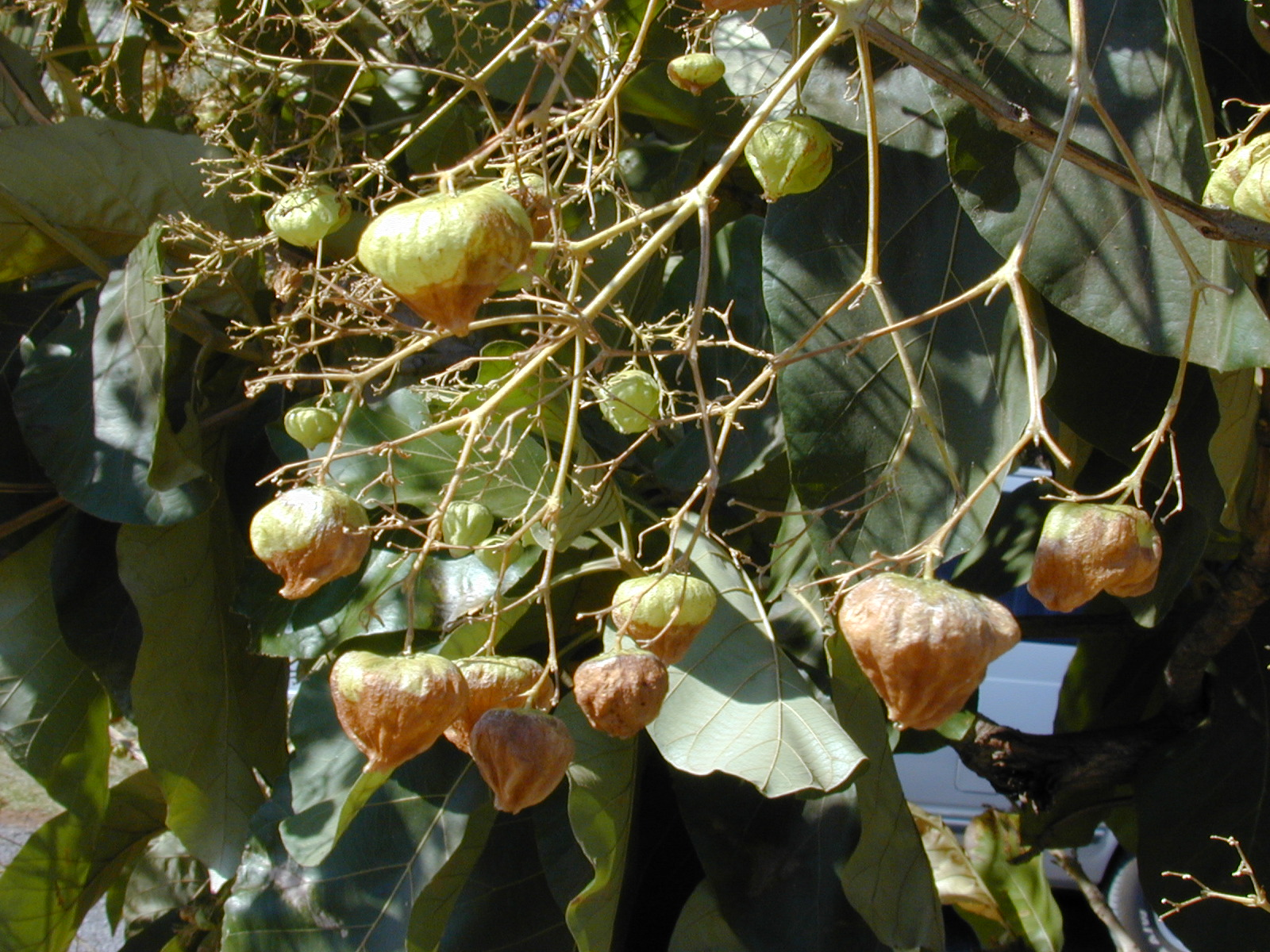
- Teak foliage and fruits

Conservation status
- Endangered (IUCN 3.1)

Scientific classification
- Kingdom: Plantae
- Clade: Tracheophytes
- Clade: Angiosperms
- Clade: Eudicots
- Clade: Asterids
- Order: Lamiales
- Family: Lamiaceae
- Genus: Tectona
- Species: T. grandis

Binomial name
- Tectona grandis L.f.

Synonyms
- Jatus grandis (L.f.) Kuntze; Tectona grandis f. abludens Koord. & Valeton; Tectona grandis f. canescens Moldenke; Tectona grandis f. pilosula Moldenke; Tectona grandis f. punctata Moldenke; Tectona grandis f. tomentella Moldenke; Tectona theca Lour.

= Teak =

Tree species native to South and Southeast Asia

Teak (Tectona grandis) is a tropical hardwood tree species in the family Lamiaceae. It is a large, deciduous tree that occurs in mixed hardwood forests. Tectona grandis has small, fragrant white flowers arranged in dense clusters (panicles) at the end of the branches. These flowers contain both types of reproductive organs (perfect flowers). The large, papery leaves of teak trees are often hairy on the lower surface. Teak wood has a leather-like smell when it is freshly milled and is particularly valued for its durability and water resistance. The teak wood is used for boat building, exterior construction, veneer, furniture, carving, turnings, and various small projects.

Tectona grandis is native to south and southeast Asia, mainly Bangladesh, India, Indonesia, Malaysia, Myanmar, Thailand, and Sri Lanka, but is naturalised and cultivated in many countries in Africa and the Caribbean. Myanmar's teak forests account for nearly half of the world's naturally occurring teak. Molecular studies show that there are two centres of the genetic origin of teak: one in India and the other in Myanmar and Laos.

== Description ==
Teak is a large deciduous tree up to 40 m (131 ft) tall with grey to greyish-brown branches, known for its high-quality wood. Its leaves are ovate-elliptic to ovate, 15–45 cm (5.9–17.7 in) long by 8–23 cm (3.1–9.1 in) wide, and are held on robust petioles which are 2–4 cm (0.8–1.6 in) long. Leaf margins are entire.

Fragrant white flowers are borne on 25–40 cm (10–16 in) long by 30 cm (12 in) wide panicles from June to August. The corolla tube is 2.5–3 mm long with 2 mm wide obtuse lobes. Tectona grandis sets fruit from September to December; fruits are globose and 1.2–1.8 cm in diameter. Flowers are weakly protandrous in that the anthers precede the stigma in maturity and pollen is shed within a few hours of the flower opening. The flowers are primarily entomophilous (insect-pollinated), but can occasionally be anemophilous (wind-pollinated). A 1996 study found that in its native range in Thailand, the major pollinators were species in the bee genus Ceratina.

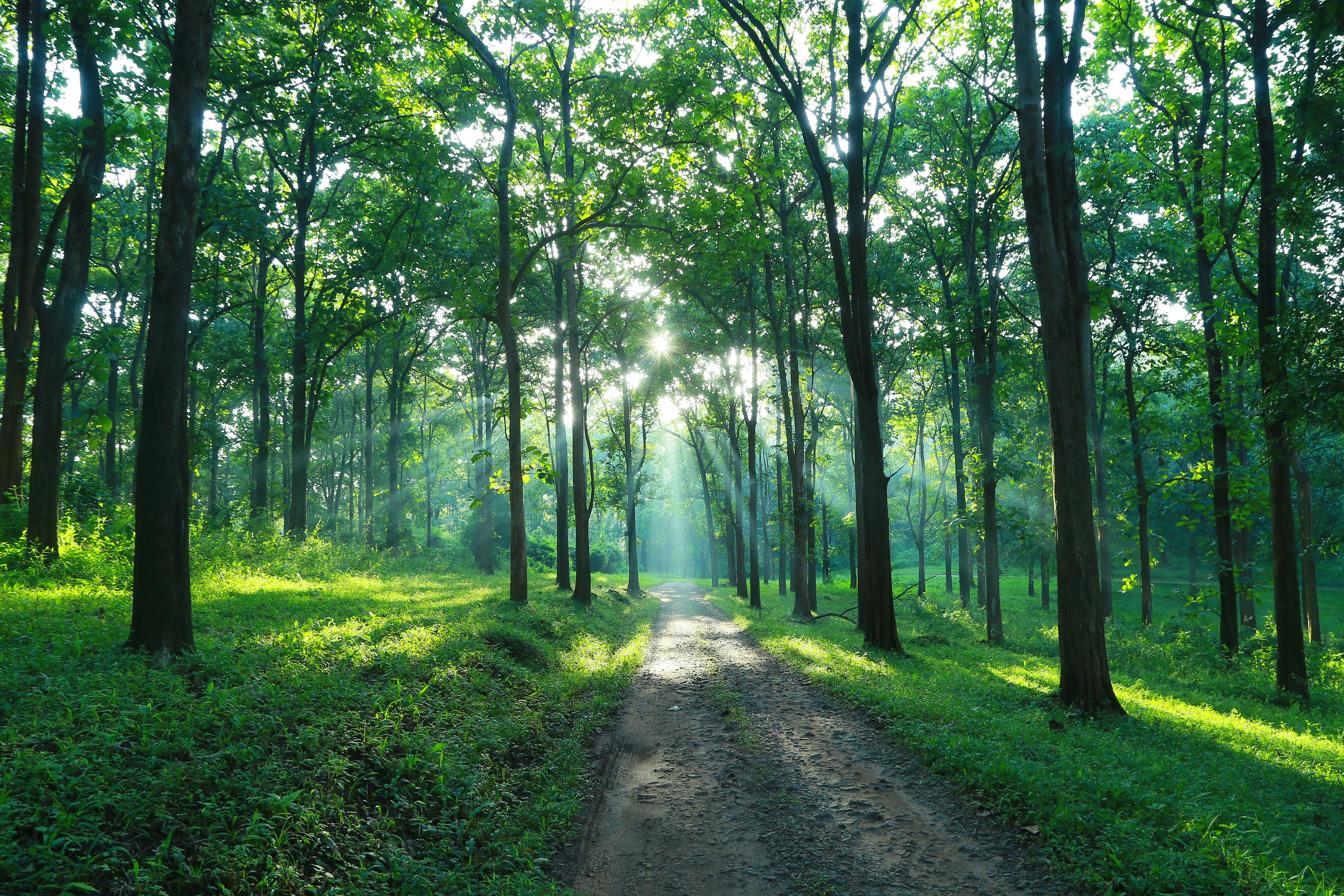
Teak forest with large foliage in Parambikulam Tiger Reserve, India

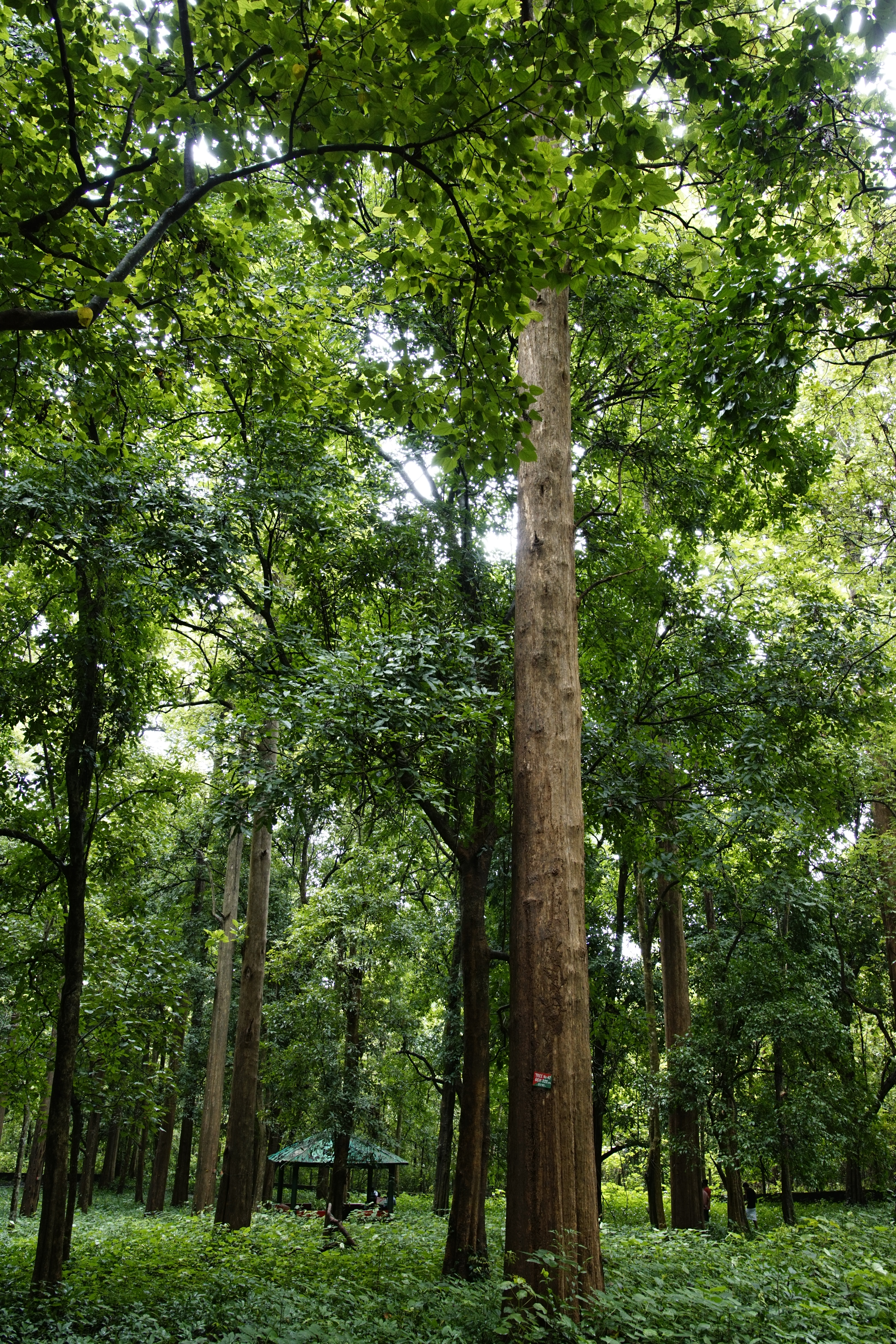
Teak forest in Nilambur, India

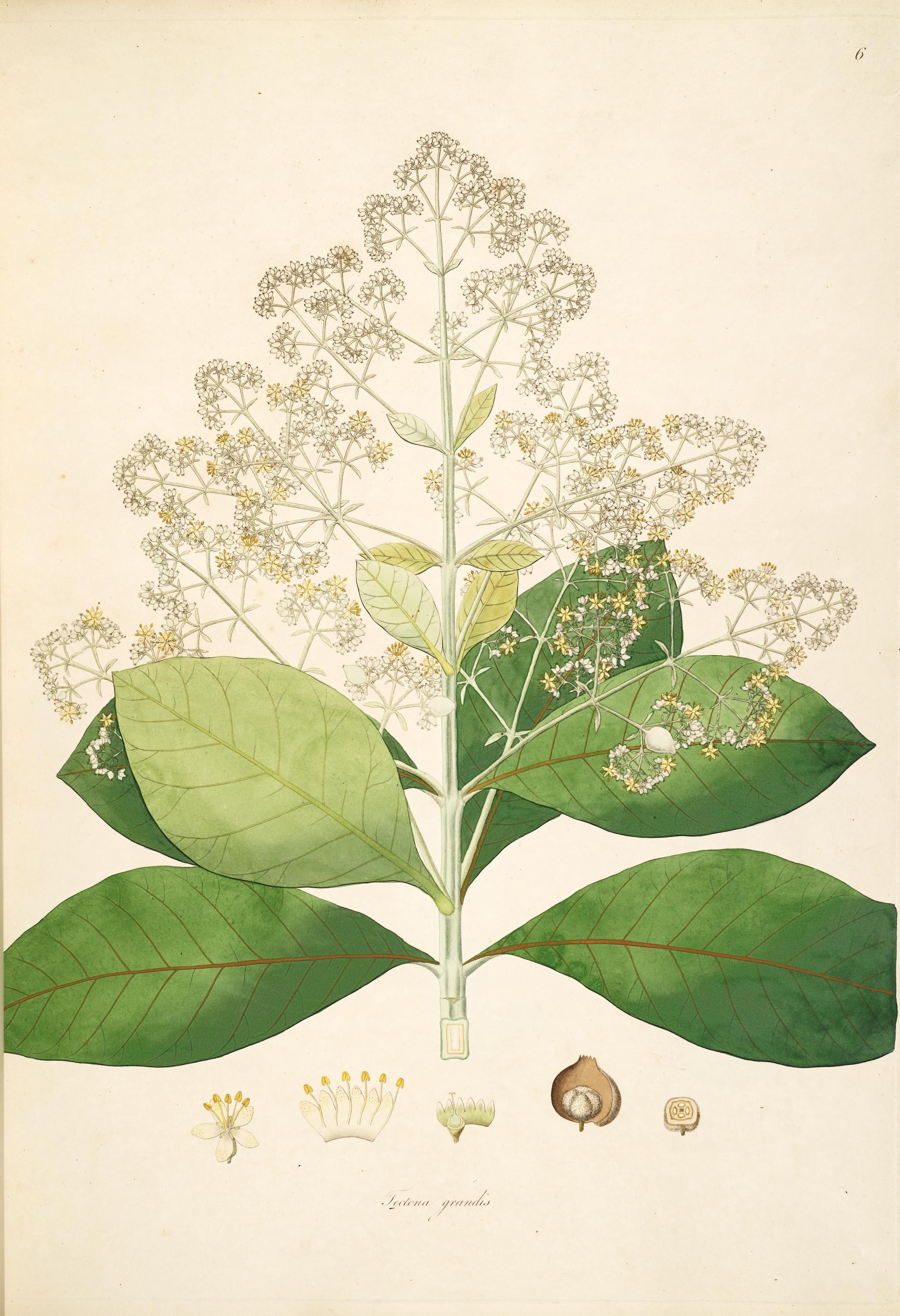
Illustration showing detail of leaves, buds and flowers

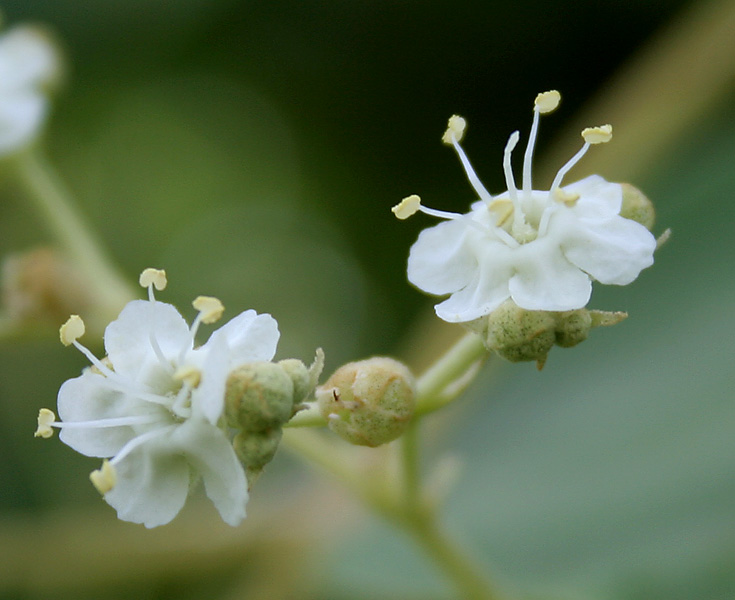
Flowers at Ananthagiri Hills, in Rangareddy district of Telangana, India

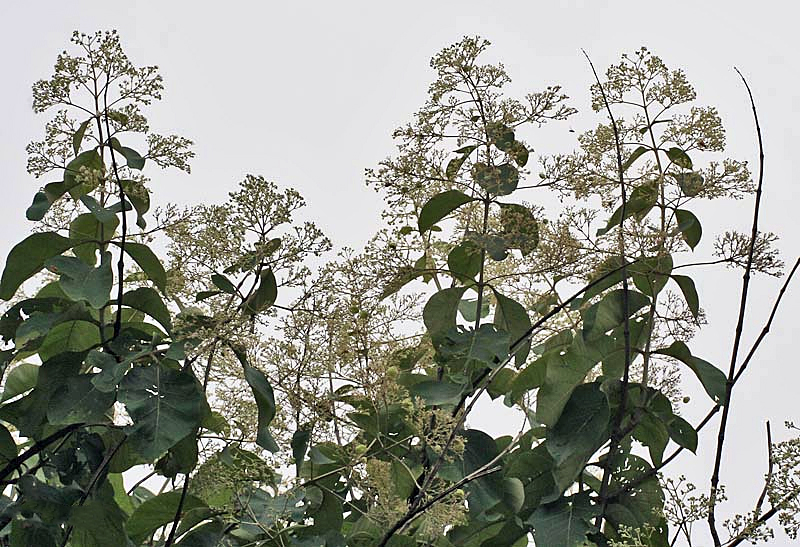
Flower, fruit and leaves of teak in Kolkata, West Bengal, India

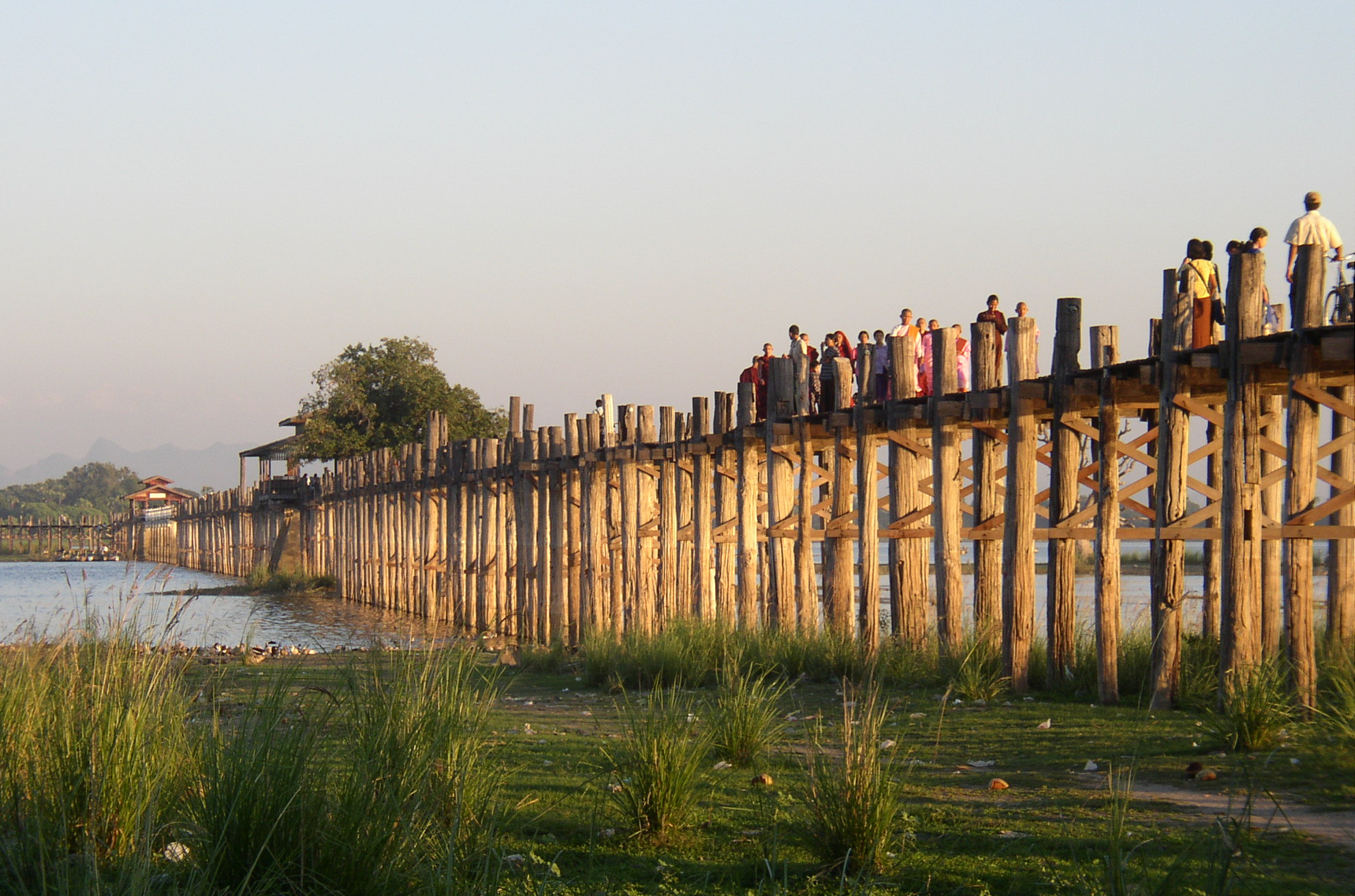
U Bein Bridge Amarapura, Myanmar. The longest teak bridge in the world at 1.2 km (0.75 mi).

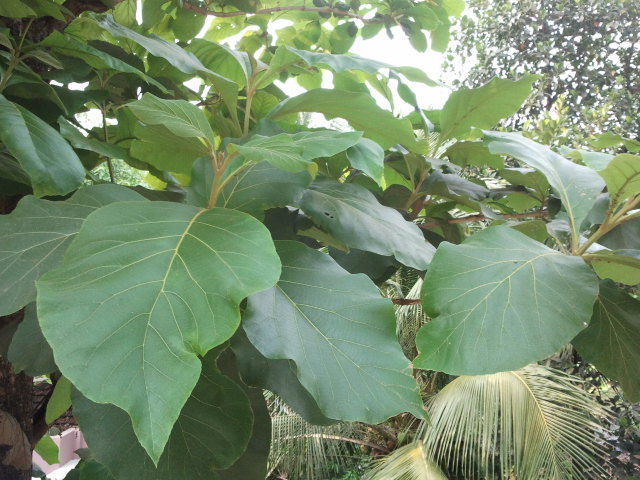
Leaves of teak in Nilambur, Kerala

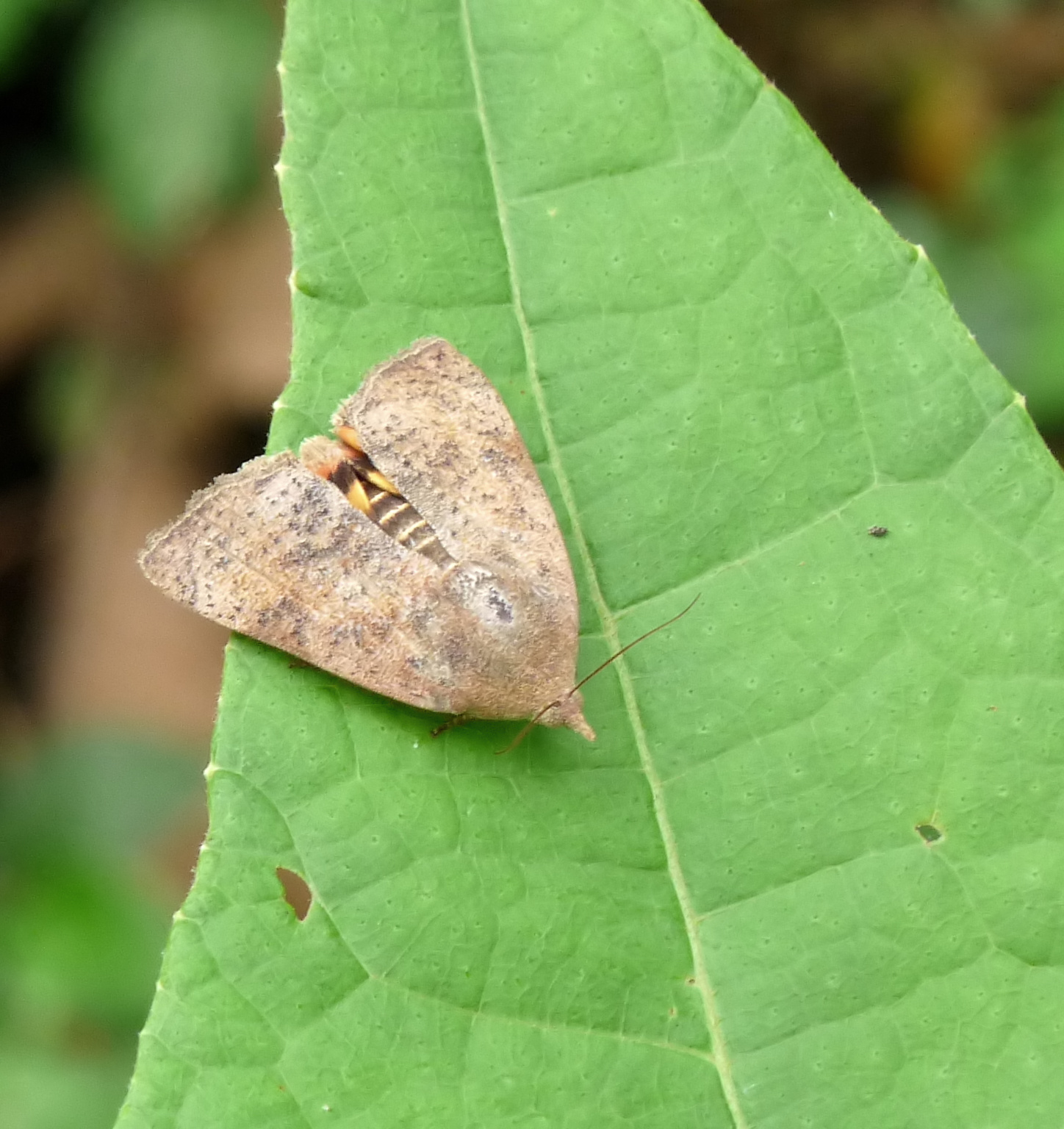
Teak defoliator in Kerala

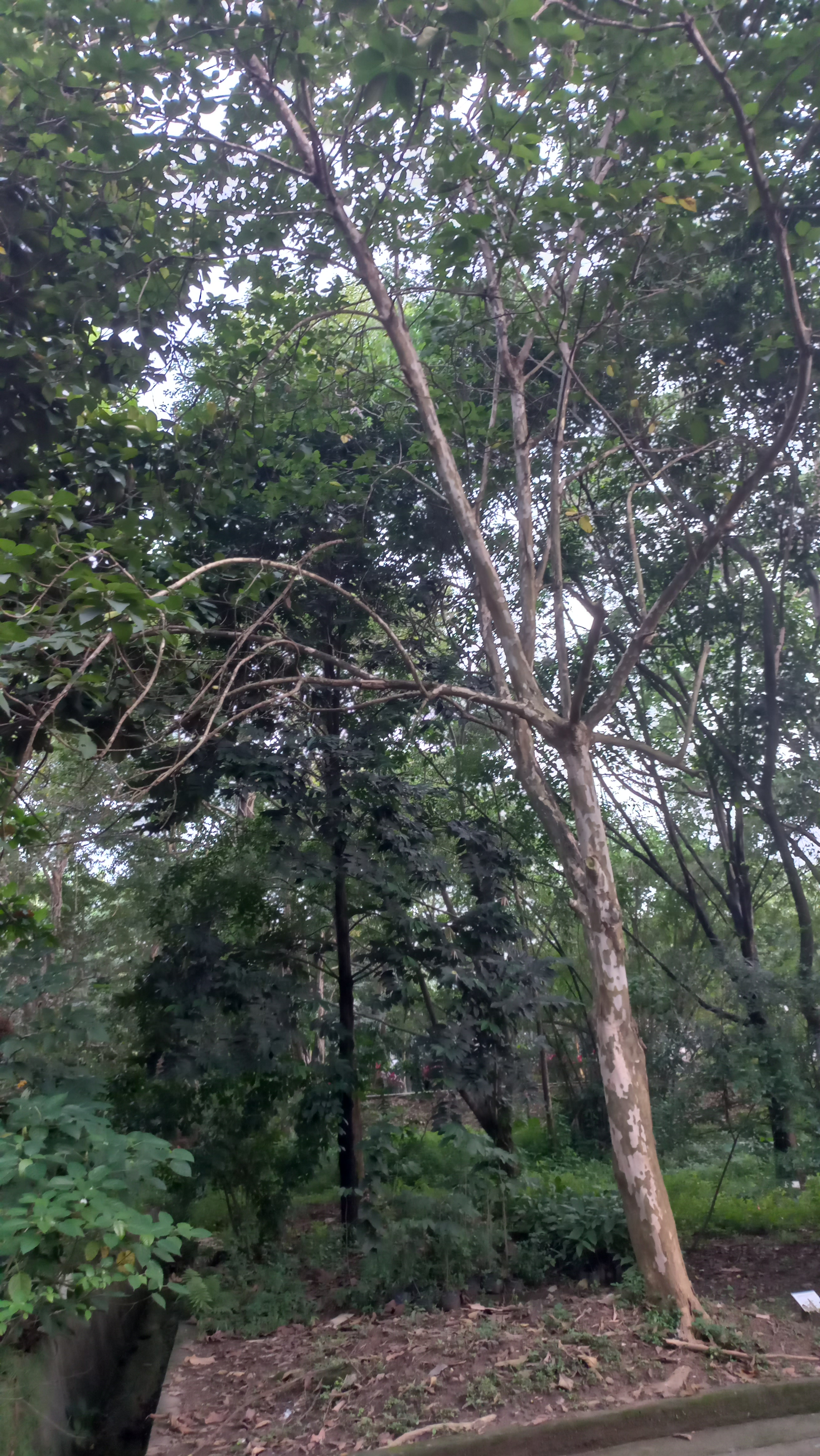
Philippine teak

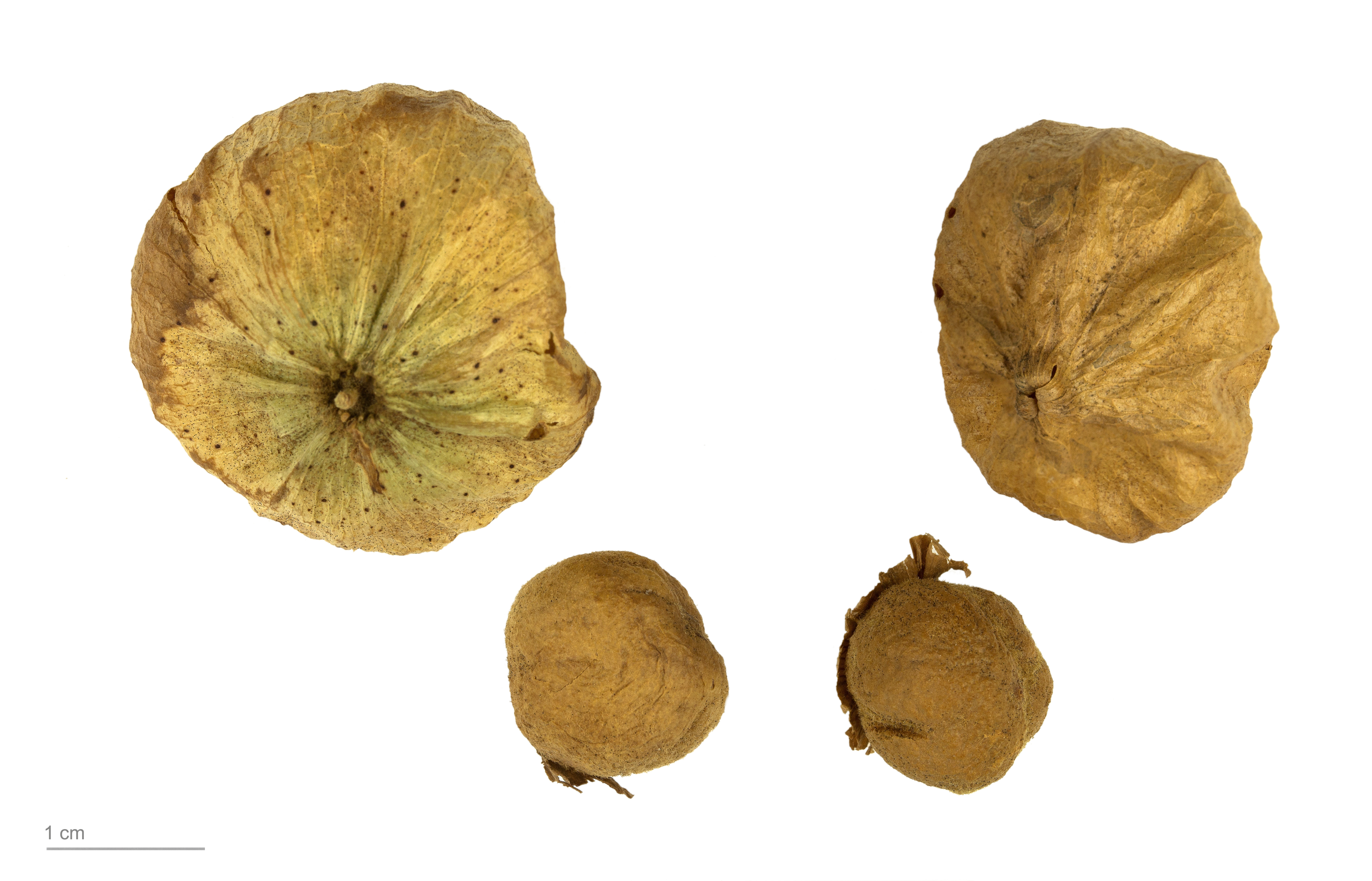
Tectona grandis - MHNT

=== Wood ===
Wood texture is hard and rings are porous. The density varies according to moisture content: at 15% moisture content it is 660 kg/m^{3}. The heartwood is yellowish to golden-brown. Sapwood is whitish to pale yellowish brown. It can easily separate from heartwood. Teak darkens as it ages. There can be a large variation, depending on which region the teak is from. Old growth has much tighter rings than new growth. There is a leather-like scent in newly cut wood.

== Botanical history ==
Tectona grandis was first formally described by Carl Linnaeus the Younger in his 1782 work Supplementum Plantarum. In 1975, Harold Norman Moldenke published new descriptions of four forms of this species in the journal Phytologia. Moldenke described each form as varying slightly from the type specimen: T. grandis f. canescens is distinguished from the type material by being densely canescent or covered in hairs, on the underside of the leaf, T. grandis f. pilosula is distinct from the type material in the varying morphology of the leaf veins, T. grandis f. punctata is only hairy on the larger veins on the underside of the leaf, and T. grandis f. tomentella is noted for its dense yellowish tomentose hairs on the lower surface of the leaf.

== Etymology ==
The word teak derives from the Portuguese teca from Tamil tekku (cognate with Telugu teku, and Kannada tegu), and was first used in English in the 1690s.

== Distribution and habitat ==
Tectona grandis is one of three species in the genus Tectona. The other two species, T. hamiltoniana and T. philippinensis, are endemics with relatively small native distributions in Myanmar and the Philippines, respectively. Tectona grandis is native to India, Bangladesh, Sri Lanka, Indonesia, Myanmar, northern Thailand, northwestern Laos, and southern Vietnam.

Tectona grandis is found in a variety of habitats and climatic conditions from arid areas with only 500 mm (20 in) of rain per year to very moist forests with up to 5,000 mm (200 in) of rain per year. Typically, though, the annual rainfall in areas where teak grows averages 1,250–1,650 mm (49–65 in) with a 3–5 month dry season.

== Cultivation ==
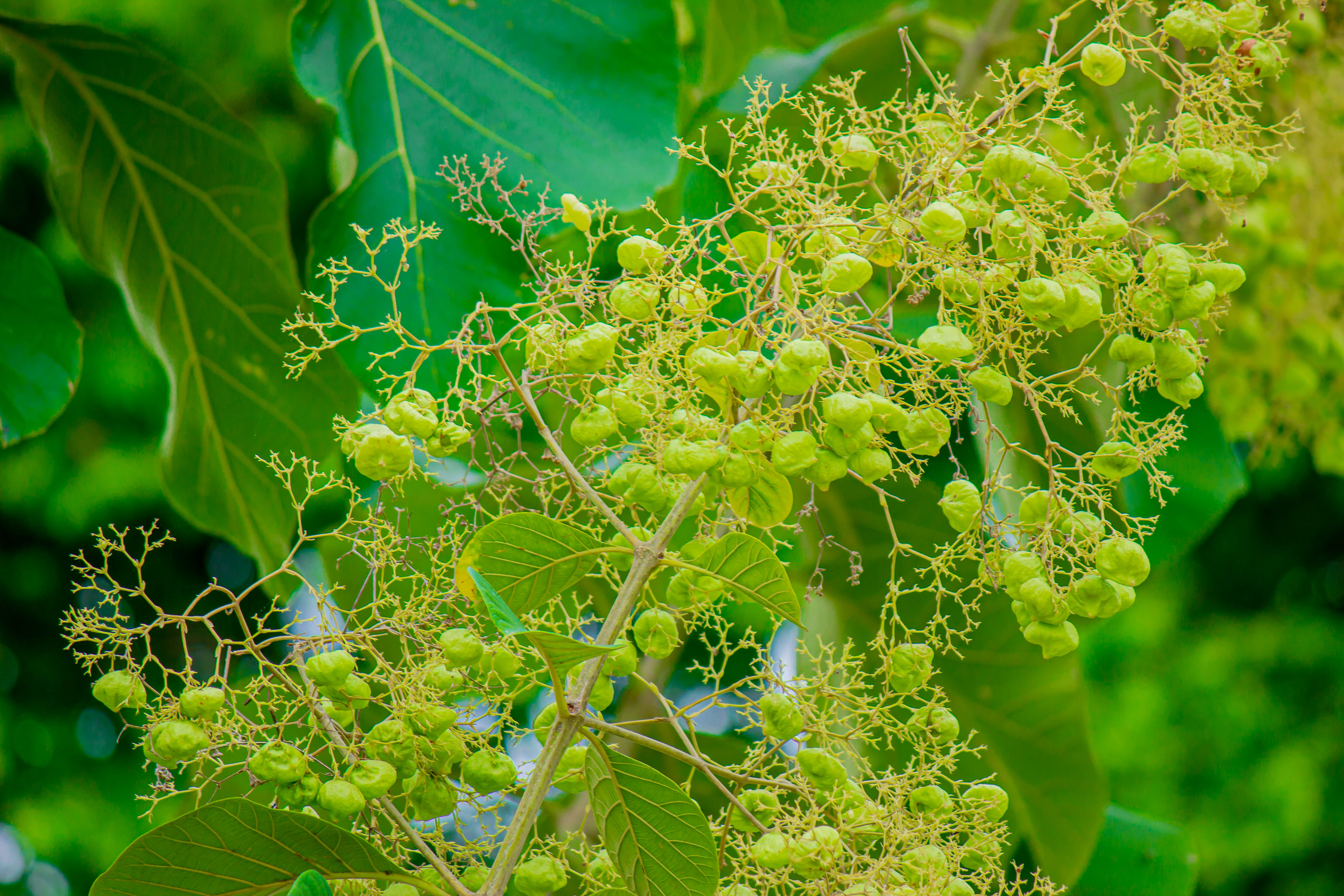
Teak in Ghana

Teak's natural oils make it useful in exposed locations and make the timber termite- and pest-resistant. Teak is durable even when not treated with oil or varnish. Timber cut from old teak trees was once believed to be more durable and harder than plantation-grown teak. Studies have shown that plantation teak performs on par with old-growth teak in erosion rate, dimensional stability, warping, and surface checking, but is more susceptible to colour change from UV exposure.

The vast majority of commercially harvested teak is grown on teak plantations found in Indonesia and controlled by Perum Perhutani (a state-owned forest enterprise) that manages the country's forests. The primary use of teak harvested in Indonesia is in the production of outdoor teak furniture for export. Nilambur in Kerala, India, is also a major producer of teak and is home to the world's oldest teak plantation.

Teak consumption raises several environmental concerns, such as the disappearance of rare old-growth teak. However, its popularity has led to growth in sustainable plantation teak production throughout the seasonally dry tropics in forestry plantations. The Forest Stewardship Council offers certification of sustainably grown and harvested teak products. Propagation of teak via tissue culture for plantation purposes is commercially viable.

Teak plantations were widely established in Equatorial Africa during the Colonial era. These timber resources, as well as the oil reserves, are at the heart of the current (2014) South Sudanese conflict.

Much of the world's teak is exported by Indonesia and Myanmar. There is also a rapidly growing plantation-grown market in Central America (Costa Rica) and South America. With a depletion of remaining natural hectares of teak forests, growth in plantations in Latin America is expected to rise.

Hyblaea puera, commonly known as the teak defoliator, is a moth native to southeast Asia. It is a teak pest whose caterpillar feeds on teak and other species of trees common in the region of Southeast Asia.

== Uses ==
Teak's high oil content, high tensile strength, and tight grain make it particularly suitable where weather resistance is desired. It is used in the manufacture of outdoor furniture and boat decks. It is also used for cutting boards, indoor flooring, countertops, and as a veneer for indoor finishings. Although easily worked, it can cause severe blunting on edged tools because of the presence of silica in the wood. Over time teak can weather to a silvery-grey finish, especially when exposed to sunlight.

Teak is used extensively in India to make doors and window frames, furniture, and columns, and beams in homes. It is resistant to termite attacks and damage caused by other insects. Mature teak fetches a high price. It is grown extensively by forest departments of different Indian states in forest areas. It was also used in the construction of the Kaaba in the Masjid al-Haram of Mecca, which is the holiest structure in the Islamic faith.

Leaves of the teak wood tree are used in making Pellakai gatti (jackfruit dumpling), where batter is poured into a teak leaf and steamed. This type of usage is found in the coastal district of Udupi in the Tulunadu region in South India. The leaves are also used in gudeg, a dish of young jackfruit made in Central Java, Indonesia, and give the dish its dark brown colour.

Teak is used as a food plant by the larvae of moths of the genus Endoclita including E. aroura, E. chalybeatus, E. damor, E. gmelina, E. malabaricus, E. sericeus, E. signifer and other Lepidoptera, including the turnip moth.

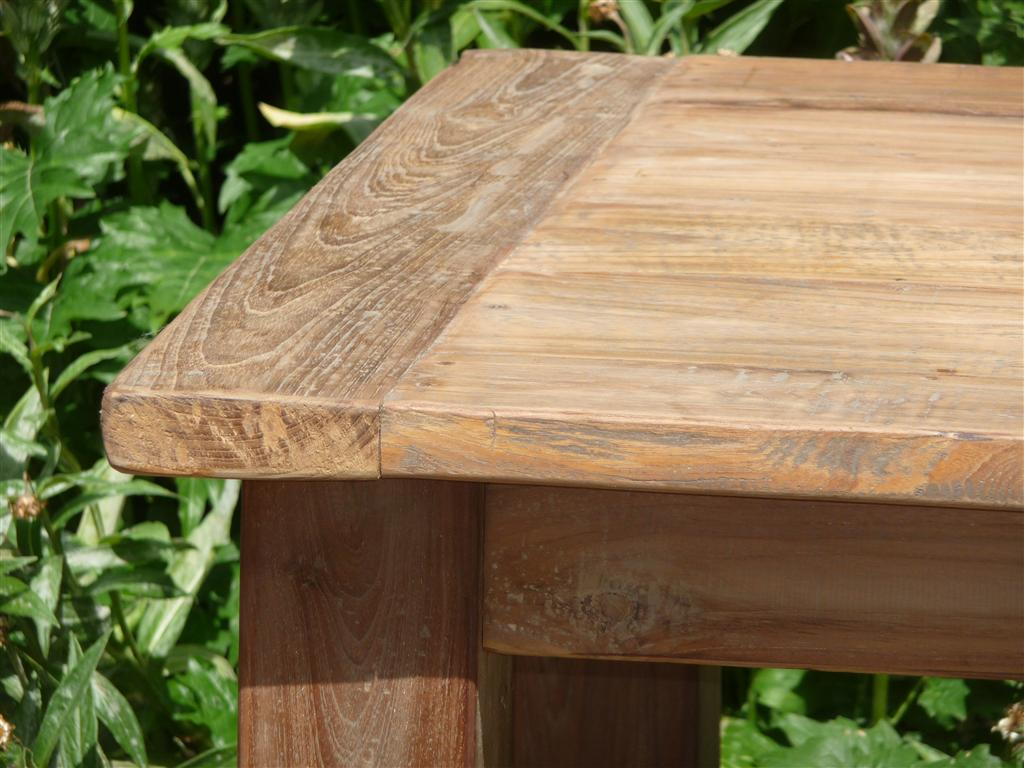
Teak table

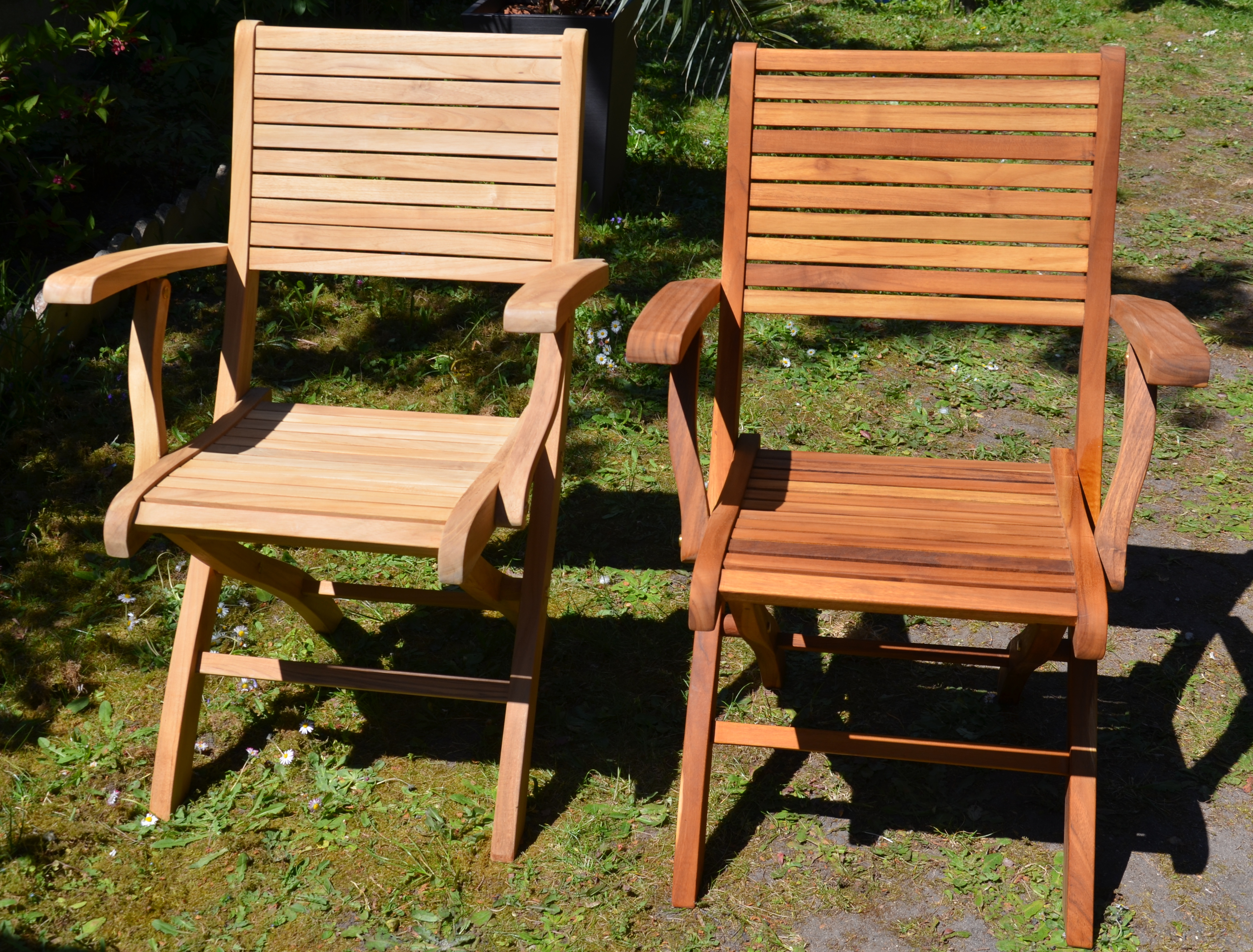
Teak garden armchairs

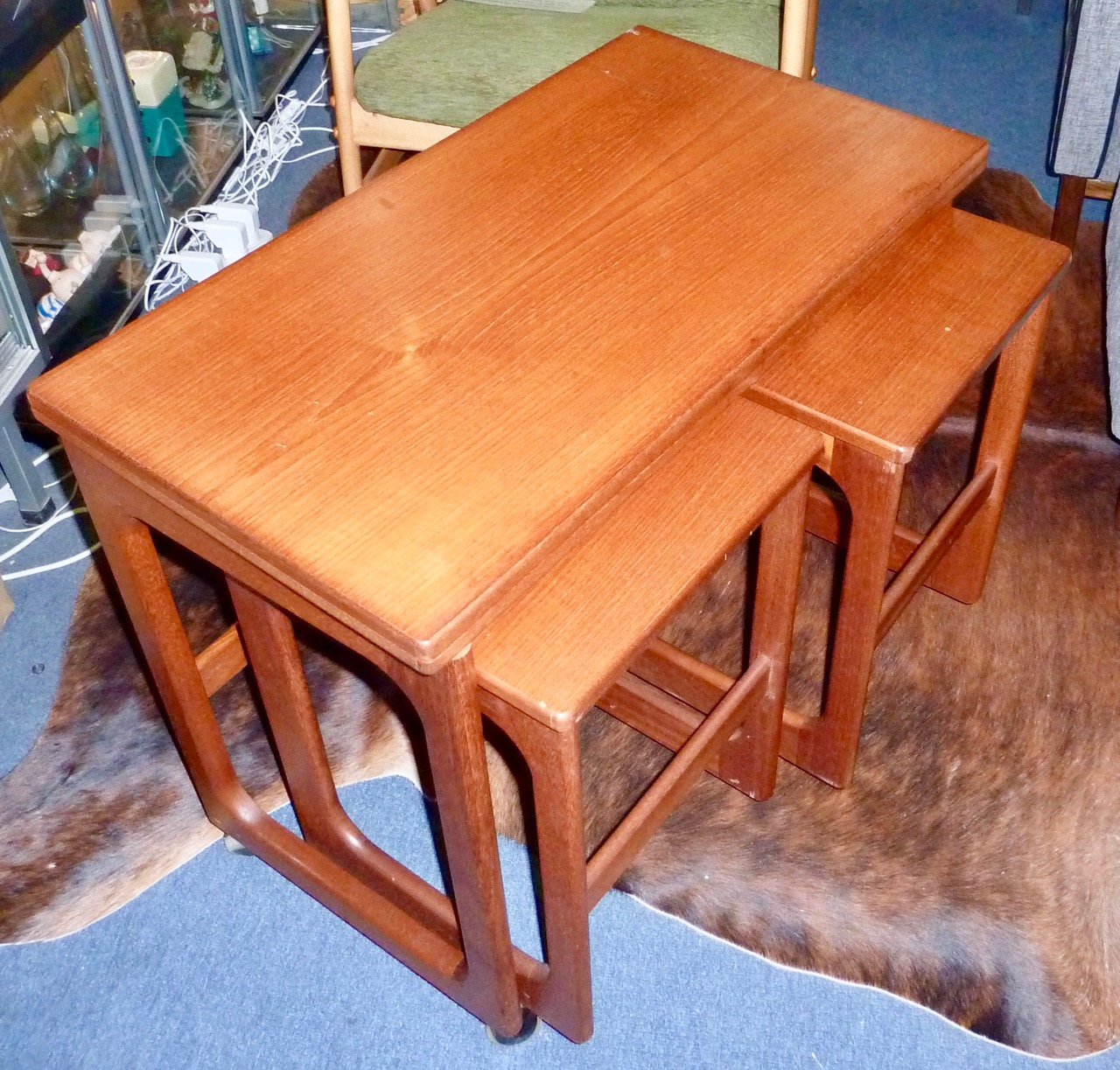
Teak nested tables

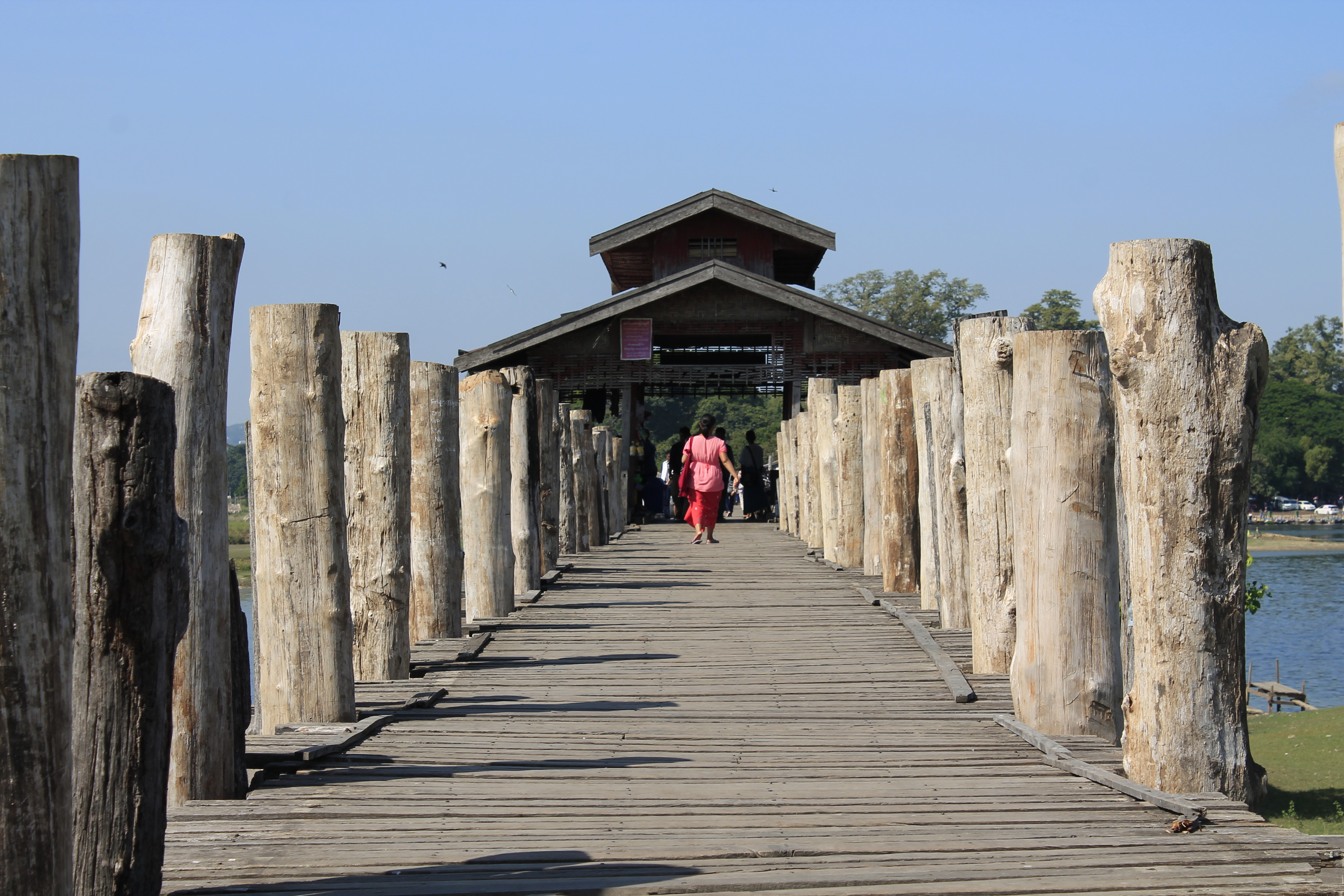
The U Bein Bridge in Myanmar is made from reclaimed teak wood.

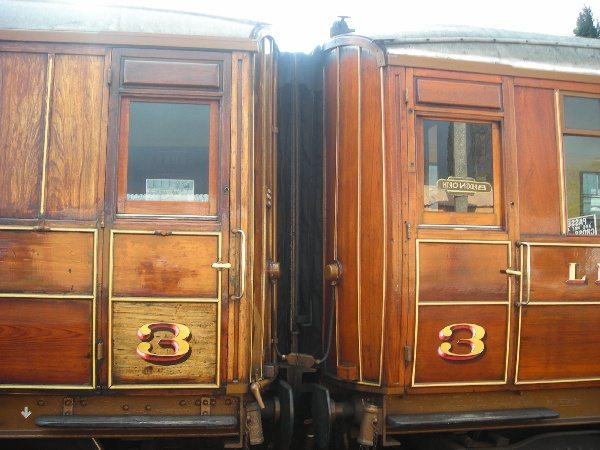
The LNER used teak for their coaches until 1942, when the Thompson all-steel coaches were introduced; both kinds coexist.

=== Boatbuilding ===
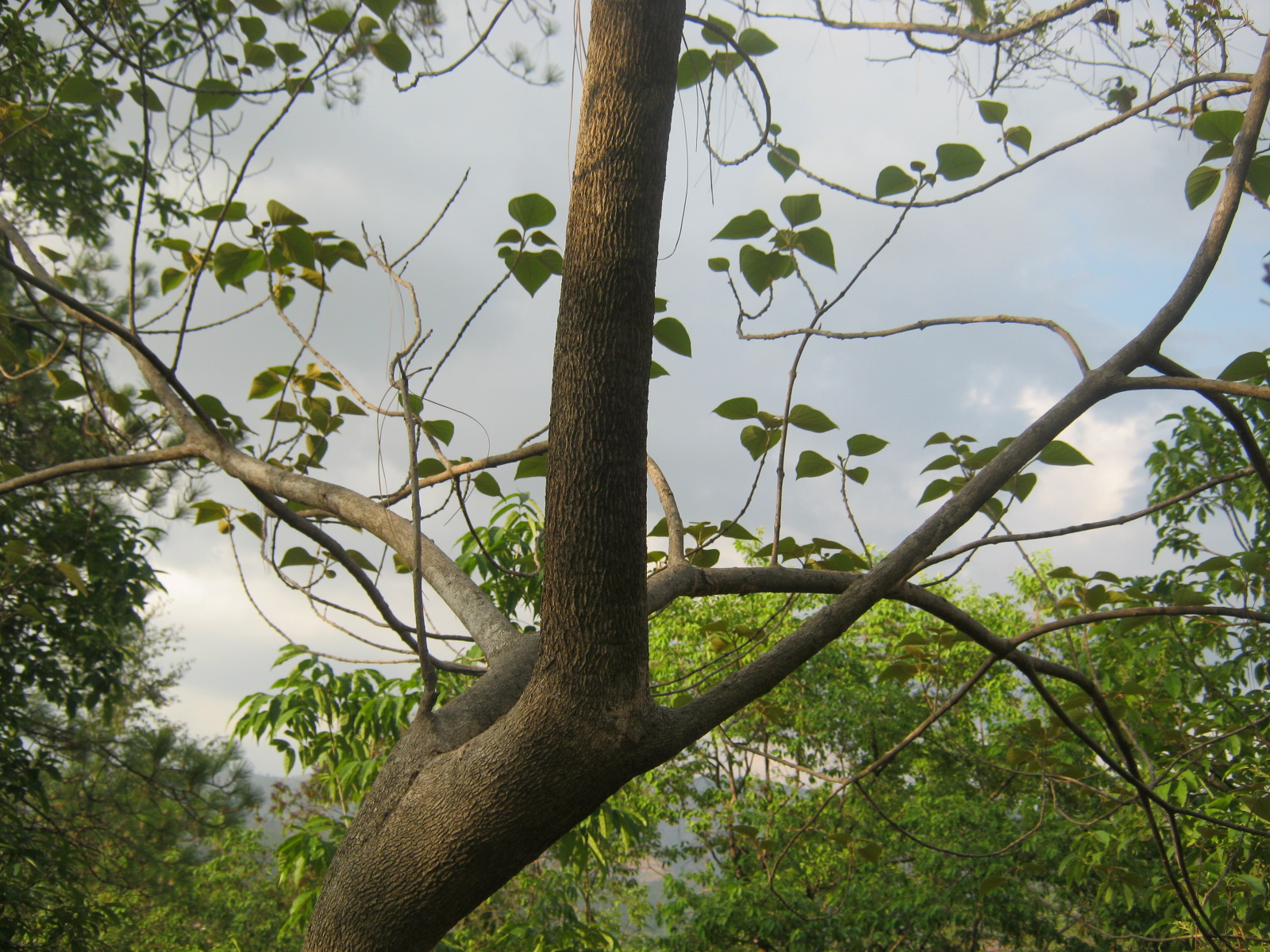
Teak tree in Panchkhal valley in Nepal

Teak has been used as a boatbuilding material for over 2000 years (it was found in an archaeological dig in Berenice Panchrysos, a port on the Indian Roman trade route). In addition to relatively high strength, teak is also highly resistant to rot, fungi, and mildew. The wood has a relatively low shrinkage ratio, which makes it excellent for applications where it undergoes periodic changes in moisture. Teak has the unusual property of being both an excellent structural timber for framing or planking, while at the same time being easily worked and finished, unlike some otherwise similar woods such as purpleheart. For this reason, it is also prized for the trim work on boat interiors. Due to the oily nature of the wood, care must be taken to properly prepare the wood before gluing.

When used on boats, teak is also very flexible in the finishes that may be applied. One option is to use no finish at all, in which case the wood will naturally weather to a pleasing silver grey. The wood may also be oiled with a finishing agent such as linseed or tung oil. This results in a somewhat dull finish. Finally, teak may also be varnished for a deep, lustrous glow.

Teak is also used extensively in boat decks, as it is extremely durable but requires regular maintenance. The teak tends to wear into the softer 'summer' growth bands first, forming a natural 'non-slip' surface. Any sanding is therefore only damaging. The use of modern cleaning compounds, oils, or preservatives will shorten the life of the teak, as it contains natural teak oil a very small distance below the white surface. Wooden boat experts will only wash the teak with salt water, and re-caulk when needed. This cleans the deck and prevents it from drying out and the wood shrinking. The salt helps it absorb and retain moisture and prevents any mildew and algal growth. Over-maintenance, such as cleaning teak with harsh chemicals, can shorten its usable lifespan as decking. Teak has been used by the U.S. Navy for ship decks, such as the Iowa-class battleship USS Missouri, to protect against sparks caused by metal rubbing on metal, and as insulation to avoid the interior of the ship getting too hot.

== Propagation ==
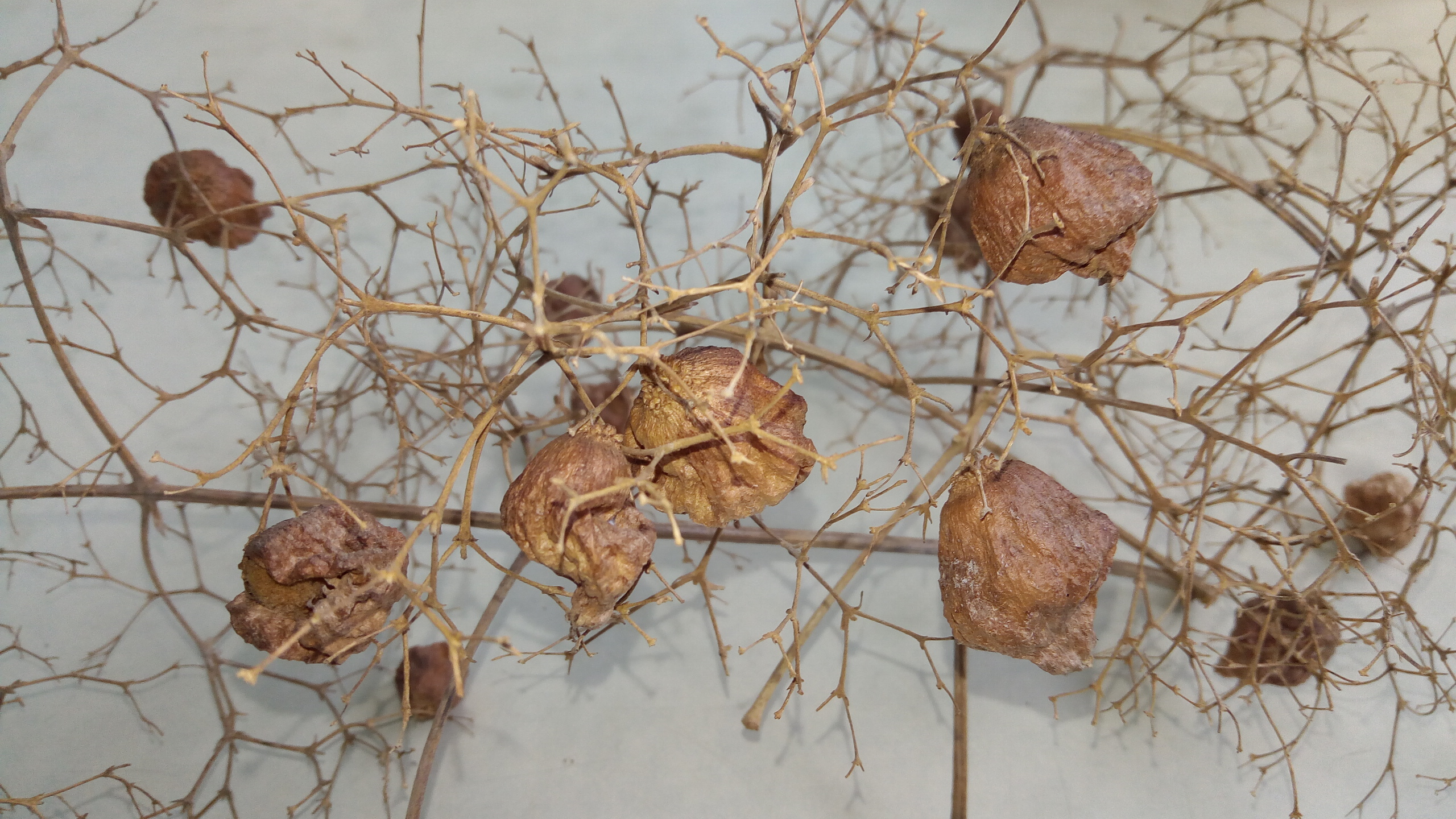
Seed of teak

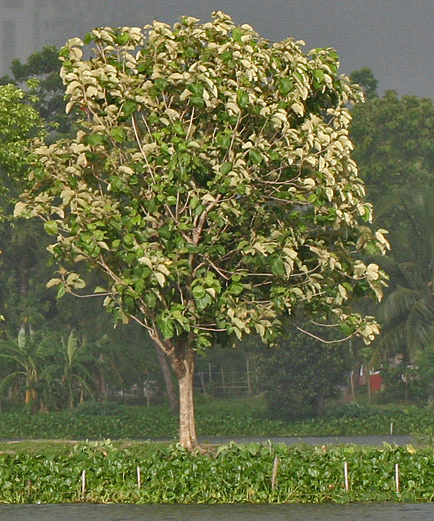
Tree in new leaves in Kolkata, West Bengal, India

Teak is propagated mainly from seeds. Germination of the seeds involves pretreatment to remove dormancy arising from the thick pericarp. Pretreatment involves alternate wetting and drying of the seed. The seeds are soaked in water for 12 hours and then spread to dry in the sun for 12 hours. This is repeated for 10–14 days and then the seeds are sown in shallow germination beds of coarse peat covered by sand. The seeds then germinate after 15 to 30 days.

Clonal propagation of teak has been successfully done through grafting, rooted stem cuttings, and micropropagation. While bud grafting onto seedling root stock has been the method used for establishing clonal seed orchards that enables assemblage of clones of the superior trees to encourage crossing, rooted stem cuttings and micro propagated plants are being increasingly used around the world for raising clonal plantations.

== Illegal logging ==
Illegal logging is prevalent in countries with natural teak forests, including India and Burma.

Since 1989, the state-owned Myanma Timber Enterprise has run the country's logging industry. In 2014, Myanmar's government imposed a strict ban on exporting wild-grown teak logs. In 2015, 153 Chinese loggers were sentenced to life in prison for illegal logging. Illegal teak logging persists, especially in contested areas. While it is illegal for timber to be exported via land borders, 95% of Myanmar's teak enters China through the China–Myanmar border.

Since the 2021 Myanmar coup d'état, illegal logging of teak and tamalan trees has surged in Sagaing Region, predominantly in key contested battlegrounds, including Kani, Yinmabin, Kantbalu, Indaw, and Banmauk townships. Both the Burmese military and resistance groups have profited from the illegal logging trade. Smugglers transport the wood to India to circumvent economic sanctions and use the Myanma Timber Enterprise to license the wood as being sourced from permitted areas.

=== EU regulation ===
The regulation that addresses the import of timber, including teak, into the EU from unknown or illegal sources is the EU Timber Regulation (EUTR) No. 995/2010. This regulation aims to prevent the trade of illegally harvested timber and timber products within the EU market. It places an obligation on operators who place timber and timber products on the EU market to ensure they are legally harvested.

This regulation specifically applies to teak and other high-risk timber species, particularly those sourced from countries with poor forest governance or illegal logging activities. Myanmar, for example, has been a focus due to concerns over illegal teak harvesting from there.

== World's largest living teak tree ==
Ministry of Environmental Conservation and Forestry (Myanmar) found the world's two biggest living teak trees on 28 August 2017 in Homalin Township, Sagaing Region, Myanmar. The biggest one, named Homemalynn 1, is 8.4 m (28 ft) in diameter and 34 m (112 ft) tall. The second biggest one, named Homemalynn 2, is 8.2 m (27 ft) in diameter.

Previously, the world's biggest recorded teak tree was located within the Parambikulam Wildlife Sanctuary in the Palakkad District of Kerala in India, named Kannimara. The tree is approximately 47.5 metres (156 ft) tall. Its age is between 450 and 500 years and is considered one of the oldest teak trees in the world.

In 2017, a tree was discovered in the Ottakallan area of the Thundathil range of the Malayattoor Forest Division in Kerala with a girth of 7.65 metres (25.1 ft) and a height of 40 metres (130 ft). A teak tree in Kappayam, Edamalayar, Kerala, which used to be considered the biggest, has a girth of 7.23 metres.

Tree No. 23 is the oldest planted teak on Earth. It is located in Conolly's plot (the world's oldest teak plantation), Nilambur, Kerala.
