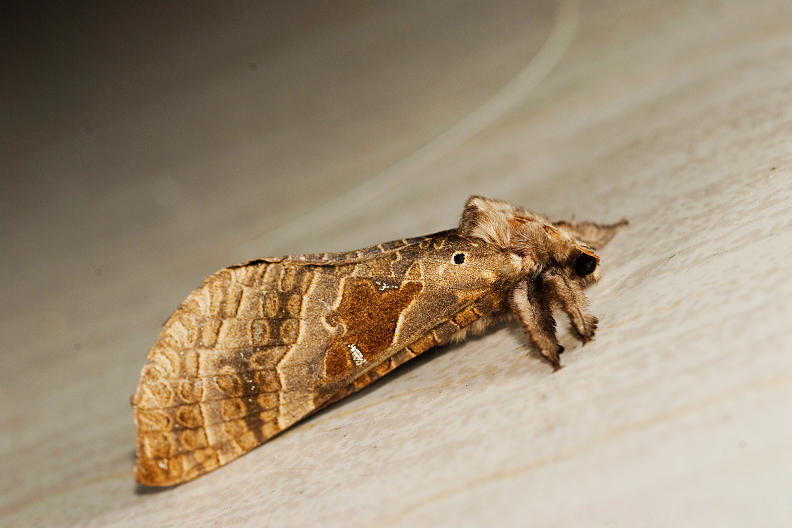
- Endoclita sinensis

Scientific classification
- Kingdom: Animalia
- Phylum: Arthropoda
- Class: Insecta
- Order: Lepidoptera
- Family: Hepialidae
- Genus: Endoclita; Felder, 1874

Species
- See text

Synonyms
- Endoclyta Felder, 1875; Hypophassus Le Cerf, 1919; Nevina Tindale, 1941; Sahyadrassus Tindale, 1941; Procharagia Viette, 1949

= Endoclita =

Genus of moths

Endoclita is a genus of moths of the family Hepialidae. There are 60 described species found in eastern and southeast Asia and the Indian subcontinent.

== Species ==
- Endoclita aboe – India
- Endoclita absurdus – China
- Endoclita actinidae – China (Fujian)
- Endoclita aikasama – Java
- Endoclita albofasciatus – India
- Endoclita anhuiensis – China (Anhui)
- Endoclita annae – China
- Endoclita aroura – Sumatra
  - Food plant: Tectona
- Endoclita auratus – Myanmar
  - Recorded food plants: Alnus, Cryptomeria, Eucalyptus
- Endoclita aurifer – Java
- Endoclita broma – Java
- Endoclita buettneria – Myanmar
  - Food plant: Byttneria
- Endoclita chalybeatus – India
  - Recorded food plants: Gmelina, Tectona, Theobroma
- Endoclita coomani – Vietnam
- Endoclita crinilimbata – China
- Endoclita chrysoptera – India
- Endoclita damor – India, Himalaya
  - Recorded food plants: Albizia, Altingia, Cinchona, Coffea, Erythrina, Eugenia, Glochidion, Manglietia, Nyssa, Schima, Tectona, Tetradium, Theobroma
- Endoclita davidi – China
- Endoclita excrescens – Japan, Russia (far east) – a pest of tobacco
  - Recorded food plants: Castanea, Nicotiana, Paulownia, Quercus, Raphanus
- Endoclita fijianodus – China (Fujian)
- Endoclita gmelina – Myanmar
  - Recorded food plants: Gmelina, Tectona
- Endoclita hoenei – China
- Endoclita hosei – Borneo
  - Recorded food plants: Elettaria, Eucalyptus, Theobroma
- Endoclita ijereja – Borneo
- Endoclita inouei – Taiwan
- Endoclita javaensis – Java
- Endoclita jianglingensis – China (Hubei)
- Endoclita jingdongensis – China (Yunnan)
- Endoclita kara – Java
- Endoclita magnus – India
- Endoclita makundae – India
- Endoclita malabaricus – India
- Endoclita marginenotatus – China
- Endoclita metallica
- Endoclita microscripta – India
- Endoclita minanus – China (Fujian)
- Endoclita mingiganteus –
- Endoclita niger – Java
- Endoclita nodus
- Endoclita paraja – Borneo
- Endoclita punctimargo – Sikkim
  - Recorded food plants: Camellia, Cryptomeria
- Endoclita purpurescens – Sri Lanka
  - Recorded food plants: Camellia, Cinchona
- Endoclita raapi – Nias
- Endoclita rustica – India
- Endoclita salsettensis – India
- Endoclita salvazi – Laos
- Endoclita sericeus – Java
  - Recorded food plants: Albizia, Camellia, Cinchona, Crotalaria, Manihot, Tectona, Theobroma
- Endoclita sibelae – Bacan
- Endoclita signifer – India, China (Hunan)
  - Recorded food plants: Clerodendrum, Gmelina, Tectona, Vitis
- Endoclita sinensis – China, Korea, Taiwan
  - Recorded food plants: Castanea, Quercus
- Endoclita strobilanthes – India
- Endoclita taranu – Sumatra
- Endoclita topeza – Laos
- Endoclita tosa – Java
- Endoclita undulifer – India
  - Recorded food plants: Alnus, Byttneria, Callicarpa, Cryptomeria, Eucalyptus, Gmelina
- Endoclita viridis – India
- Endoclita warawita – Borneo
- Endoclita williamsi – Philippines
- Endoclita xizangensis – China (Hunan)
- Endoclita yunnanensis – China (Yunnan)
