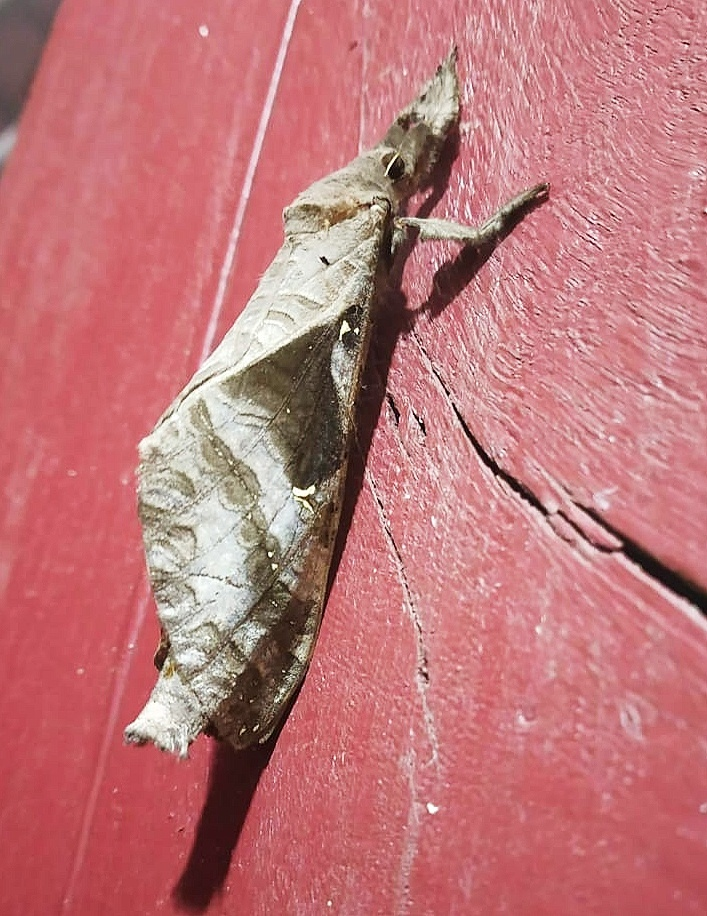

Scientific classification
- Kingdom: Animalia
- Phylum: Arthropoda
- Class: Insecta
- Order: Lepidoptera
- Family: Hepialidae
- Genus: Endoclita
- Species: E. malabaricus

Binomial name
- Endoclita malabaricus (Moore, 1879)

Synonyms
- Phassus malabaricus Moore, 1879; Sahyadrassus malabaricus

= Endoclita malabaricus =

Species of moth

Endoclita malabaricus is a species of moth of the family Hepialidae. It is known from the Western Ghats of India. At rest it looks like a dry leaf. The species overlaps in range with Endoclita magnus.

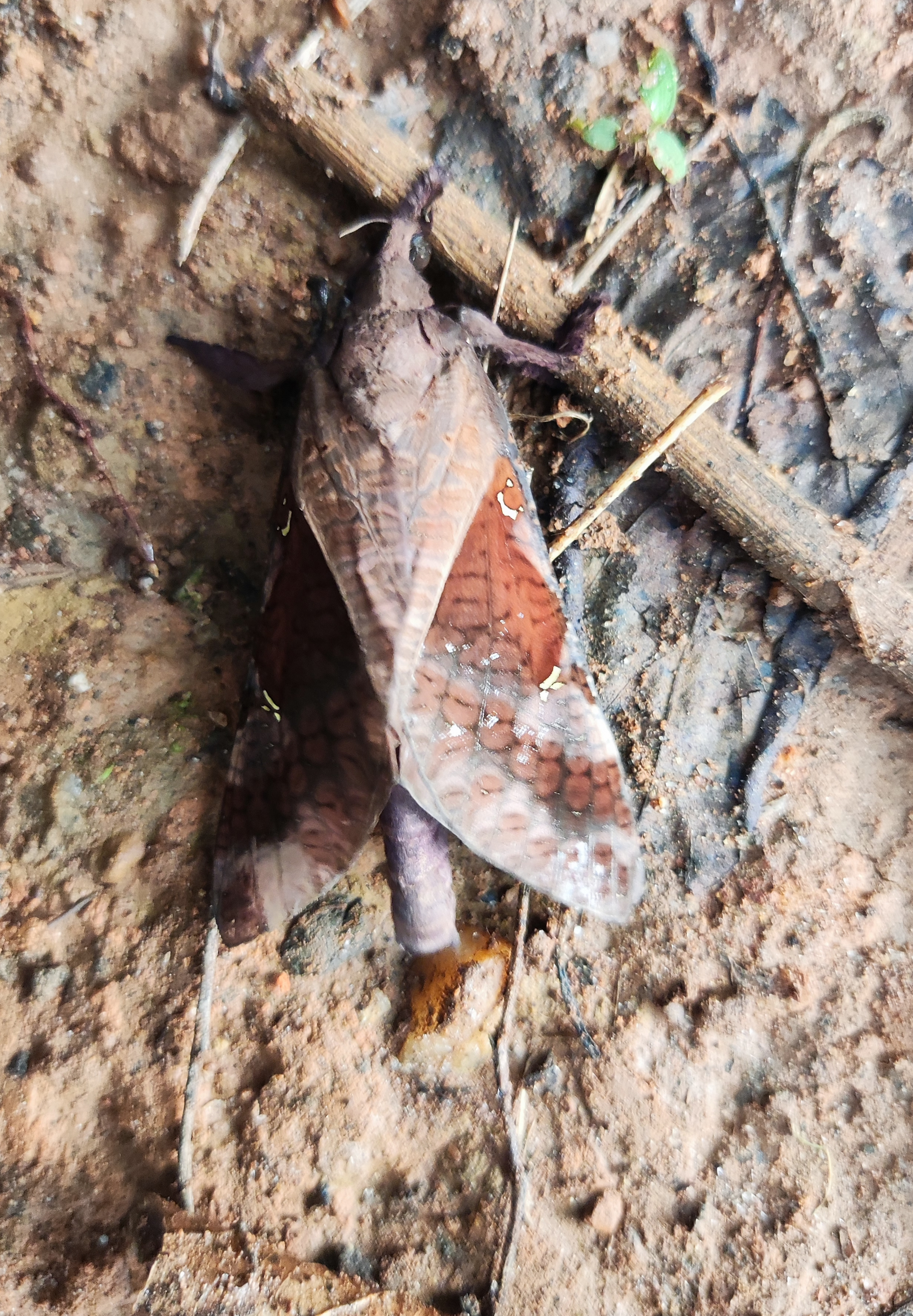

Adult moths are active particularly from March to May when they emerge. The adults have mouthparts that are highly reduced and they do not feed. They live for about three to four days. Newly emerged females lay eggs even before mating. They are prolific egg layers, some species of Hepialidae have been recorded to lay as many as 40000 eggs. The eggs are broadcast in flight. The larvae bore into the stems of plants and grow by tunneling through the centre of the stem. The entry hole is often covered in frass. The larvae take about a year before they pupate. The adults emerge after about a month from pupation.

Food plants for this species include Acacia, Ailanthus, Albizia, Bridelia, Cajanus, Callicarpa, Camellia, Cassia, Casuarina, Clerodendrum, Coffea, Cordia, Eucalyptus, Eugenia, Filicium, Gliricidia, Gmelina, Grewia, Gyrocarpus, Herissantia, Lagerstroemia, Lantana, Macaranga, Mallotus, Ocimum, Rosa, Santalum, Sapindus, Solanum, Strobilanthes callosus, Tectona, Trema, and Ziziphus.
