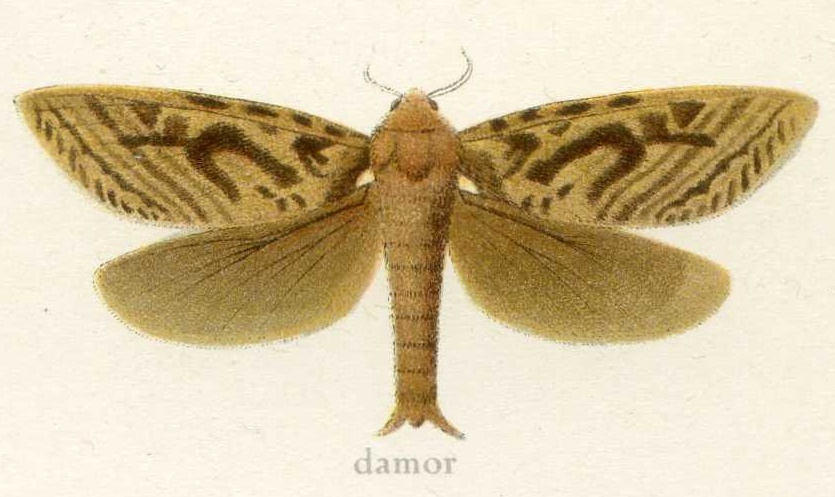

Scientific classification
- Kingdom: Animalia
- Phylum: Arthropoda
- Class: Insecta
- Order: Lepidoptera
- Family: Hepialidae
- Genus: Endoclita
- Species: E. damor

Binomial name
- Endoclita damor (Moore, [1860])

Synonyms
- Phassus damor Moore, [1860]; Endoclita similis Felder, 1874

= Endoclita damor =

Species of moth

Endoclita damor is a species of moth of the family Hepialidae. It is known from India and the Himalayas. Food plants for this species include Albizia, Altingia, Cinchona, Coffea, Erythrina, Eugenia, Glochidion, Manglietia, Nyssa, Schima, Tectona, Tetradium, and Theobroma.
