= Endoclita hoenei =

Scientific classification
- Kingdom: Animalia
- Phylum: Arthropoda
- Class: Insecta
- Order: Lepidoptera
- Family: Hepialidae
- Genus: Endoclita
- Species: E. hoenei

Binomial name
- Endoclita hoenei (Daniel, 1949)

Synonyms
- Phassus hoenei Daniel, 1949

Species of moth

Endoclita hoenei is a species of moth of the family Hepialidae. It is known from China.
