= Endoclita buettneria =

Scientific classification
- Kingdom: Animalia
- Phylum: Arthropoda
- Class: Insecta
- Order: Lepidoptera
- Family: Hepialidae
- Genus: Endoclita
- Species: E. buettneria

Binomial name
- Endoclita buettneria Tindale, 1941

Species of moth

Endoclita buettneria is a species of moth of the family Hepialidae. It is known from Myanmar. The food plant for this species is Byttneria.
