= Endoclita aboe =

Scientific classification
- Kingdom: Animalia
- Phylum: Arthropoda
- Class: Insecta
- Order: Lepidoptera
- Family: Hepialidae
- Genus: Endoclita
- Species: E. aboe

Binomial name
- Endoclita aboe (Moore, [1860])

Synonyms
- Phassus aboe Moore, [1860]

Species of moth

Endoclita aboe is a species of moth of the family Hepialidae. It is known from India.
