= Endoclita absurdus =

Scientific classification
- Kingdom: Animalia
- Phylum: Arthropoda
- Class: Insecta
- Order: Lepidoptera
- Family: Hepialidae
- Genus: Endoclita
- Species: E. absurdus

Binomial name
- Endoclita absurdus (Daniel, 1940)

Synonyms
- Phassus absurdus Daniel, 1940

Species of moth

Endoclita absurdus is a species of moth of the family Hepialidae. It is known from China.
