= Endoclita xizangensis =

Scientific classification
- Kingdom: Animalia
- Phylum: Arthropoda
- Class: Insecta
- Order: Lepidoptera
- Family: Hepialidae
- Genus: Endoclita
- Species: E. xizangensis

Binomial name
- Endoclita xizangensis (Chu and Wang, 1985)

Synonyms
- Phassus xizangensis Chu and Wang, 1985

Species of moth

Endoclita xizangensis is a species of moth of the family Hepialidae. It is known from Hunan, China.
