= Endoclita niger =

Scientific classification
- Kingdom: Animalia
- Phylum: Arthropoda
- Class: Insecta
- Order: Lepidoptera
- Family: Hepialidae
- Genus: Endoclita
- Species: E. niger

Binomial name
- Endoclita niger (van Eecke, 1915)

Synonyms
- Phassus niger van Eecke, 1915; Phassus pfitzneri Gaede in Pfitzner and Gaede, 1933

Species of moth

Endoclita niger is a species of moth of the family Hepialidae. It is known from Java, Indonesia.
