= Endoclita annae =

Scientific classification
- Kingdom: Animalia
- Phylum: Arthropoda
- Class: Insecta
- Order: Lepidoptera
- Family: Hepialidae
- Genus: Endoclita
- Species: E. annae

Binomial name
- Endoclita annae (Le Cerf, 1933)

Synonyms
- Hypophassus annae Le Cerf, 1933

Species of moth

Endoclita annae is a species of moth of the family Hepialidae. It is known from China.
