= Endoclita aurifer =

Scientific classification
- Kingdom: Animalia
- Phylum: Arthropoda
- Class: Insecta
- Order: Lepidoptera
- Family: Hepialidae
- Genus: Endoclita
- Species: E. aurifer

Binomial name
- Endoclita aurifer Tindale, 1958

Species of moth

Endoclita aurifer is a species of moth of the family Hepialidae. It is known from Java, Indonesia.
