= Endoclita metallica =

Scientific classification
- Kingdom: Animalia
- Phylum: Arthropoda
- Class: Insecta
- Order: Lepidoptera
- Family: Hepialidae
- Genus: Endoclita
- Species: E. metallica

Binomial name
- Endoclita metallica Tindale, 1941

Species of moth

Endoclita metallica is a species of moth of the family Hepialidae. It is found in India.
