= Endoclita fjianodus =

Scientific classification
- Kingdom: Animalia
- Phylum: Arthropoda
- Class: Insecta
- Order: Lepidoptera
- Family: Hepialidae
- Genus: Endoclita
- Species: E. fjianodus

Binomial name
- Endoclita fjianodus (Chu and Wang, 1985)

Synonyms
- Phassus fjianodus Chu and Wang, 1985

Species of moth

Endoclita fjianodus is a species of moth of the family Hepialidae. It is known from Fujian, China.
