= Endoclita purpurescens =

Scientific classification
- Kingdom: Animalia
- Phylum: Arthropoda
- Class: Insecta
- Order: Lepidoptera
- Family: Hepialidae
- Genus: Endoclita
- Species: E. purpurescens

Binomial name
- Endoclita purpurescens (Moore, [1883])

Synonyms
- Phassus purpurescens Moore, [1883]

Species of moth

Endoclita purpurescens is a species of moth of the family Hepialidae. It was described by Frederic Moore in 1883 and is known from Sri Lanka. Food plants for this species include Camellia and Cinchona.

== Description ==
The ground color of the wings is purplish in the female. Forewings with a white "comma" mark in the cell before the middle, another at the upper end with from one to four white specks just outside the cell. A black sub-basal speck between veins 1b and c. There is no brown spot on vein 1b. The triangle in the cell is small. Oblique streak is more suffused. Hindwings lack markings. Hind tarsus of male represented by a bristle. In some specimens, the ground color of the forewings is reddish brown and number of white specks are scattered about the wing and incomplete circular black marks appear on the costa and on each side of vein 1b.
