= Endoclita mingiganteus =

Scientific classification
- Kingdom: Animalia
- Phylum: Arthropoda
- Class: Insecta
- Order: Lepidoptera
- Family: Hepialidae
- Genus: Endoclita
- Species: E. mingiganteus

Binomial name
- Endoclita mingiganteus (Yang and Wang, 1992)

Synonyms
- Phassus mingiganteus Yang and Wang, 1992

Species of moth

Endoclita mingiganteus is a species of moth of the family Hepialidae. It is found in China (Fujian).
