= Endoclita undulifer =

Scientific classification
- Kingdom: Animalia
- Phylum: Arthropoda
- Class: Insecta
- Order: Lepidoptera
- Family: Hepialidae
- Genus: Endoclita
- Species: E. undulifer

Binomial name
- Endoclita undulifer (Walker, 1869)

Synonyms
- Phassus undulifer Walker, 1869; Phassus damajanti Pfitzner in Pfitzner and Gaede, 1933

Species of moth

Endoclita undulifer is a species of moth of the family Hepialidae. It is known from India. Food plants for this species include Alnus, Byttneria, Callicarpa, Cryptomeria, Eucalyptus, and Gmelina.
