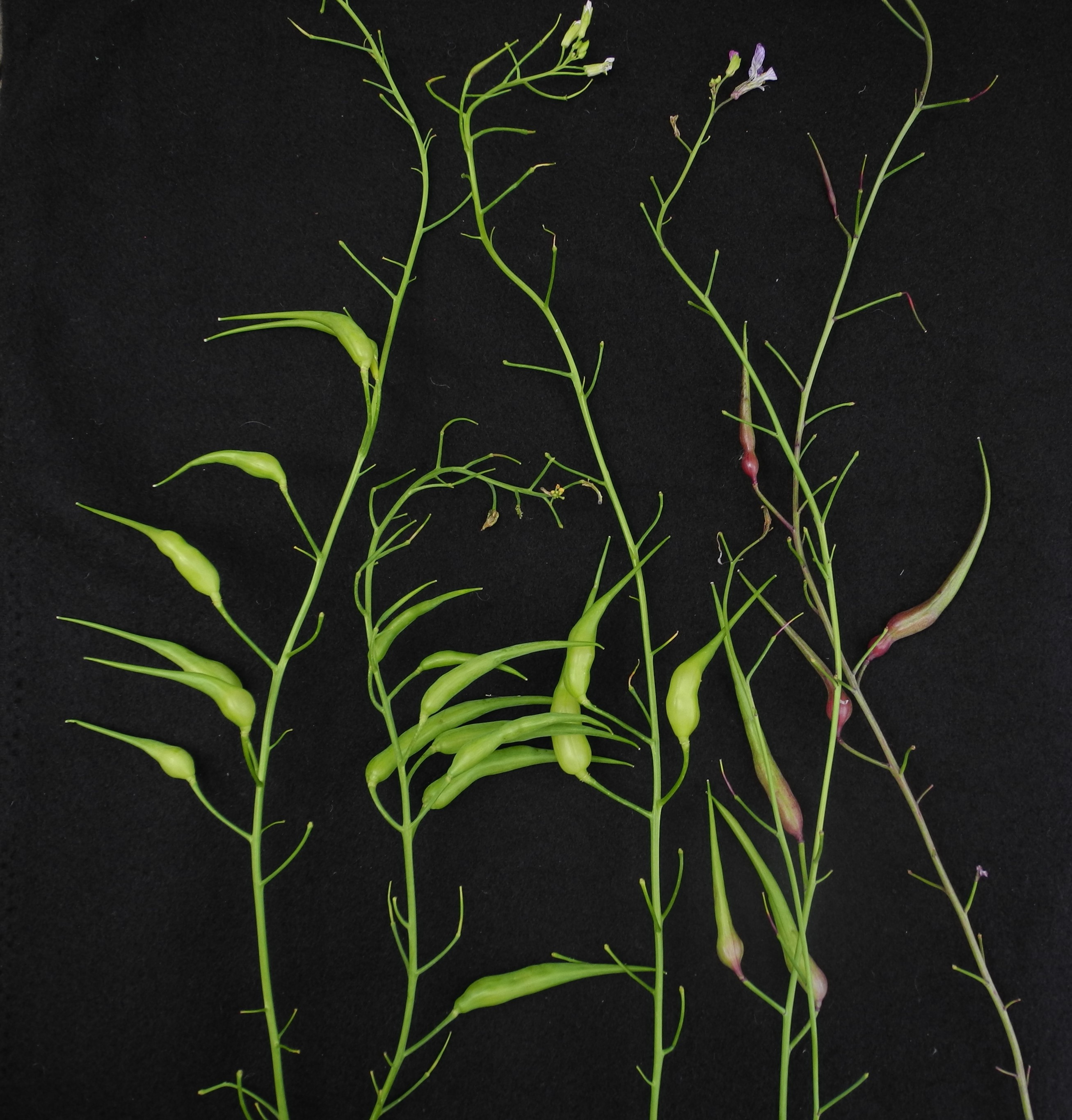
- Pods of rat-tail radish Raphanus sativus var caudatus

Scientific classification
- Kingdom: Plantae
- Clade: Tracheophytes
- Clade: Angiosperms
- Clade: Eudicots
- Clade: Rosids
- Order: Brassicales
- Family: Brassicaceae
- Genus: Raphanus
- Species: R. caudatus

Binomial name
- Raphanus caudatus L.

= Raphanus caudatus =

Podding radish

Species of plant

The rat-tail radish (Chinese: t 鼠尾蘿蔔, s 鼠尾萝卜, shǔwěi luóbó), serpent radish, or tail-pod radish is a plant of the radish genus Raphanus named for its edible seed pods. Linnaeus described it as the species Raphanus caudatus; it is now sometimes treated as a variety of the common radish (R. sativus), either caudatus or mougri.

It is found primarily in India and Southeast Asia and is believed to have originated in China. It was first known in the West no later than 1815, when introduced into England from Java.
