= Endoclita salsettensis =

Scientific classification
- Kingdom: Animalia
- Phylum: Arthropoda
- Class: Insecta
- Order: Lepidoptera
- Family: Hepialidae
- Genus: Endoclita
- Species: E. salsettensis

Binomial name
- Endoclita salsettensis (Moore, 1879)

Synonyms
- Phassus salsettensis Moore, 1879

Species of moth

Endoclita salsettensis is a species of moth of the family Hepialidae. It is known from India.
