= Endoclita rustica =

Scientific classification
- Kingdom: Animalia
- Phylum: Arthropoda
- Class: Insecta
- Order: Lepidoptera
- Family: Hepialidae
- Genus: Endoclita
- Species: E. rustica

Binomial name
- Endoclita rustica Tindale, 1941

Species of moth

Endoclita rustica is a species of moth of the family Hepialidae. It is known from India.
