= Endoclita jianglingensis =

Scientific classification
- Kingdom: Animalia
- Phylum: Arthropoda
- Class: Insecta
- Order: Lepidoptera
- Family: Hepialidae
- Genus: Endoclita
- Species: E. jianglingensis

Binomial name
- Endoclita jianglingensis (Zeng and Zhao, 1991)

Synonyms
- Phassus jianglingensis Zeng and Zhao, 1991; Phassus jiangling Zeng and Zhao, 1991

Species of moth

Endoclita jianglingensis is a species of moth of the family Hepialidae. It is known from Hubei, China.
