= Endoclita topeza =

Scientific classification
- Kingdom: Animalia
- Phylum: Arthropoda
- Class: Insecta
- Order: Lepidoptera
- Family: Hepialidae
- Genus: Endoclita
- Species: E. topeza

Binomial name
- Endoclita topeza Tindale, 1958

Species of moth

Endoclita topeza is a species of moth of the family Hepialidae. It is known from Laos.
