= Endoclita gmelina =

Scientific classification
- Kingdom: Animalia
- Phylum: Arthropoda
- Class: Insecta
- Order: Lepidoptera
- Family: Hepialidae
- Genus: Endoclita
- Species: E. gmelina

Binomial name
- Endoclita gmelina Tindale, 1941

Species of moth

Endoclita gmelina is a species of moth of the family Hepialidae. It is known from Myanmar. Food plants for this species include Gmelina and Tectona.
