= Endoclita anhuiensis =

Scientific classification
- Kingdom: Animalia
- Phylum: Arthropoda
- Class: Insecta
- Order: Lepidoptera
- Family: Hepialidae
- Genus: Endoclita
- Species: E. anhuiensis

Binomial name
- Endoclita anhuiensis (Chu and Wang, 1985)

Synonyms
- Phassus anhuiensis Chu and Wang, 1985

Species of moth

Endoclita anhuiensis is a species of moth of the family Hepialidae. It is known from Anhui, China, from which its species epithet is derived.
