= Endoclita yunnanensis =

Scientific classification
- Kingdom: Animalia
- Phylum: Arthropoda
- Class: Insecta
- Order: Lepidoptera
- Family: Hepialidae
- Genus: Endoclita
- Species: E. yunnanensis

Binomial name
- Endoclita yunnanensis (Chu and Wang, 1985)

Synonyms
- Phassus yunnanensis Chu and Wang, 1985

Species of moth

Endoclita yunnanensis is a species of moth from the family Hepialidae. It is found in Yunnan, China.
