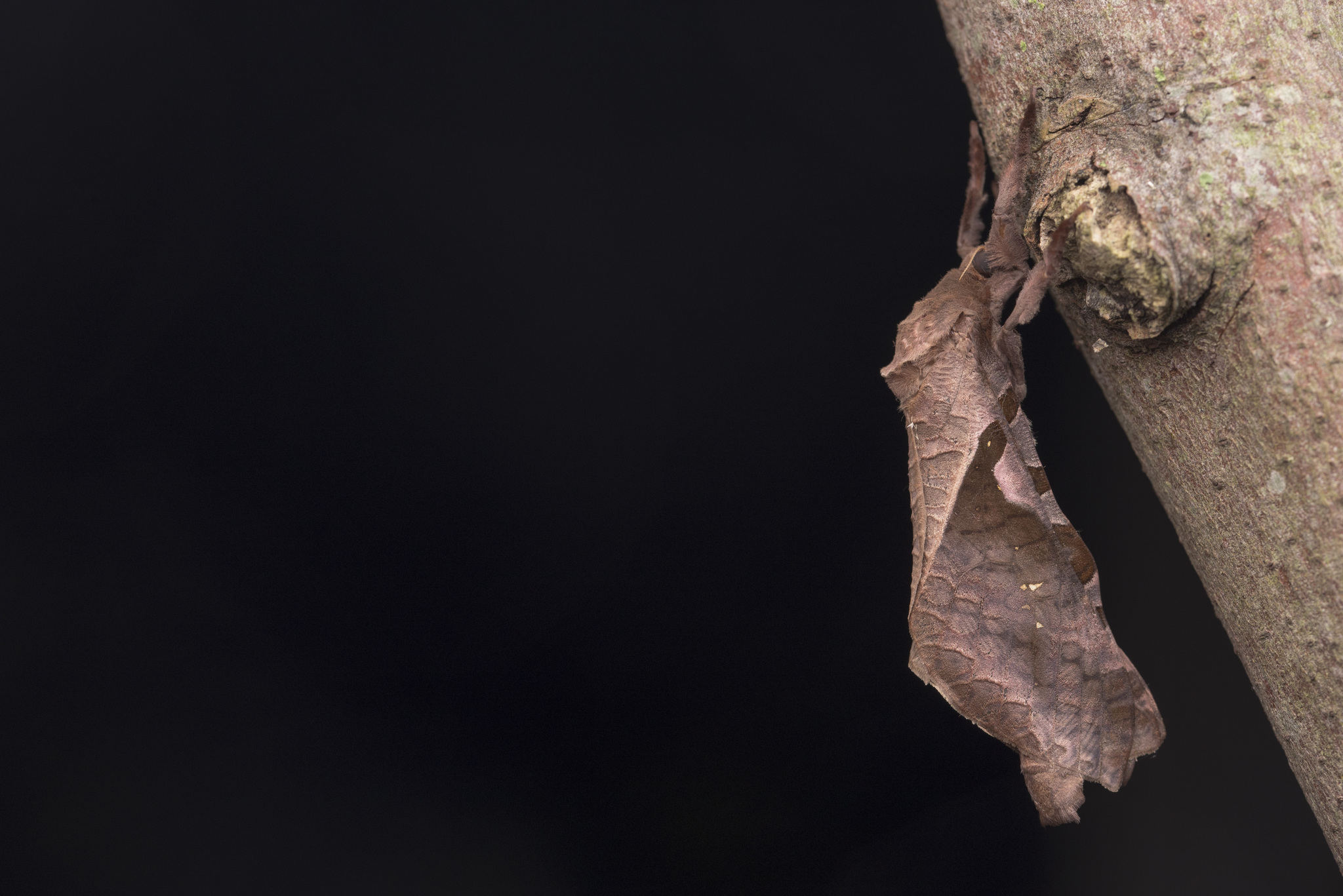

Scientific classification
- Kingdom: Animalia
- Phylum: Arthropoda
- Class: Insecta
- Order: Lepidoptera
- Family: Hepialidae
- Genus: Endoclita
- Species: E. davidi

Binomial name
- Endoclita davidi (Poujade, 1886)

Synonyms
- Hepialus davidi Poujade, 1886; Phassus nankingi Daniel, 1940; Phassus giganodus Chu and Wang, 1985

= Endoclita davidi =

Species of moth

Endoclita davidi is a species of moth of the family Hepialidae. It is known from China.
