= Endoclita crenilimbata =

Scientific classification
- Kingdom: Animalia
- Phylum: Arthropoda
- Class: Insecta
- Order: Lepidoptera
- Family: Hepialidae
- Genus: Endoclita
- Species: E. crenilimbata

Binomial name
- Endoclita crenilimbata (Le Cerf, 1919)

Synonyms
- Hypophassus crenilimbata Le Cerf, 1919

Species of moth

Endoclita crenilimbata is a species of moth of the family Hepialidae. It is known from China.
