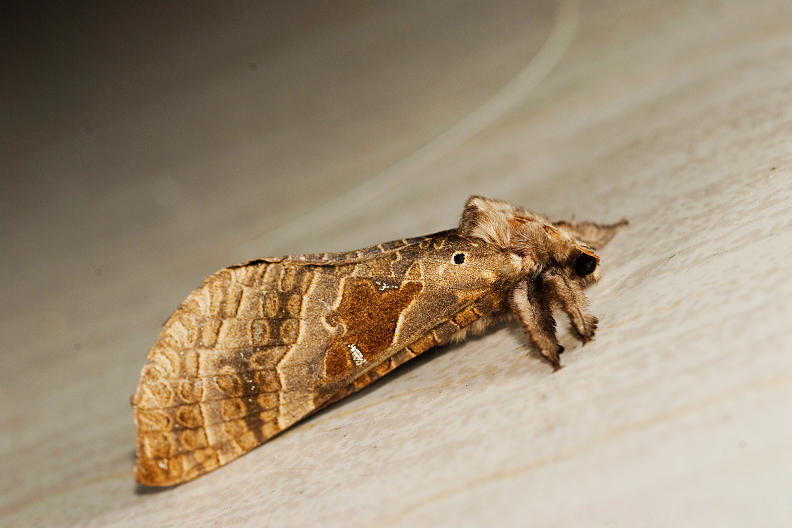

Scientific classification
- Kingdom: Animalia
- Phylum: Arthropoda
- Class: Insecta
- Order: Lepidoptera
- Family: Hepialidae
- Genus: Endoclita
- Species: E. sinensis

Binomial name
- Endoclita sinensis (Moore, 1877)

Synonyms
- Phassus sinensis Moore, 1877; Phassus herzi Fixsen, 1887; Phassus formosanus Shiraki, 1913; Phassus kosemponis Strand, 1916

= Endoclita sinensis =

Species of moth

Endoclita sinensis is a species of moth of the family Hepialidae. It is known from China, Korea and Taiwan, as well as from the Far East of Russia. Food plants for this species include Castanea and Quercus.
