= Endoclita aroura =

Scientific classification
- Kingdom: Animalia
- Phylum: Arthropoda
- Class: Insecta
- Order: Lepidoptera
- Family: Hepialidae
- Genus: Endoclita
- Species: E. aroura

Binomial name
- Endoclita aroura Tindale, 1958

Species of moth

Endoclita aroura is a species of moth of the family Hepialidae. It is known from Sumatra. The food plant for this species is Tectona.
