= Endoclita javaensis =

Scientific classification
- Kingdom: Animalia
- Phylum: Arthropoda
- Class: Insecta
- Order: Lepidoptera
- Family: Hepialidae
- Genus: Endoclita
- Species: E. javaensis

Binomial name
- Endoclita javaensis Viette, 1950

Species of moth

Endoclita javaensis is a species of moth of the family Hepialidae. It is known from Java, Indonesia.
