= Endoclita sibelae =

Scientific classification
- Kingdom: Animalia
- Phylum: Arthropoda
- Class: Insecta
- Order: Lepidoptera
- Family: Hepialidae
- Genus: Endoclita
- Species: E. sibelae

Binomial name
- Endoclita sibelae (Roepke, 1935)

Synonyms
- Phassus sibelae Roepke, 1935

Species of moth

Endoclita sibelae is a species of moth of the family Hepialidae. It is known from the Moluccas (Bacan).
