= Endoclita auratus =

Scientific classification
- Kingdom: Animalia
- Phylum: Arthropoda
- Class: Insecta
- Order: Lepidoptera
- Family: Hepialidae
- Genus: Endoclita
- Species: E. auratus

Binomial name
- Endoclita auratus (Hampson, [1893])

Synonyms
- Phassus auratus Hampson, [1893]

Species of moth

Endoclita auratus is a species of moth of the family Hepialidae. It is known from Myanmar. The food plants for this species are Alnus, Cryptomeria, and Eucalyptus.
