= Endoclita punctimargo =

Scientific classification
- Kingdom: Animalia
- Phylum: Arthropoda
- Class: Insecta
- Order: Lepidoptera
- Family: Hepialidae
- Genus: Endoclita
- Species: E. punctimargo

Binomial name
- Endoclita punctimargo (C. Swinhoe, 1892)

Synonyms
- Phassus punctimargo C. Swinhoe, 1892; Phassus punctimargo Hampson, [1893] (nec C. Swinhoe, 1892)

Species of moth

Endoclita punctimargo is a species of moth of the family Hepialidae first described by Charles Swinhoe in 1892. It is known from the Indian state of Sikkim.
