= Endoclita marginenotatus =

Scientific classification
- Kingdom: Animalia
- Phylum: Arthropoda
- Clade: Pancrustacea
- Class: Insecta
- Order: Lepidoptera
- Family: Hepialidae
- Genus: Endoclita
- Species: E. marginenotatus

Binomial name
- Endoclita marginenotatus (Leech, 1898)

Synonyms
- Phassus marginenotatus Leech, 1898

Species of moth

Endoclita marginenotatus is a species of moth of the family Hepialidae. It is known to be found in China.
