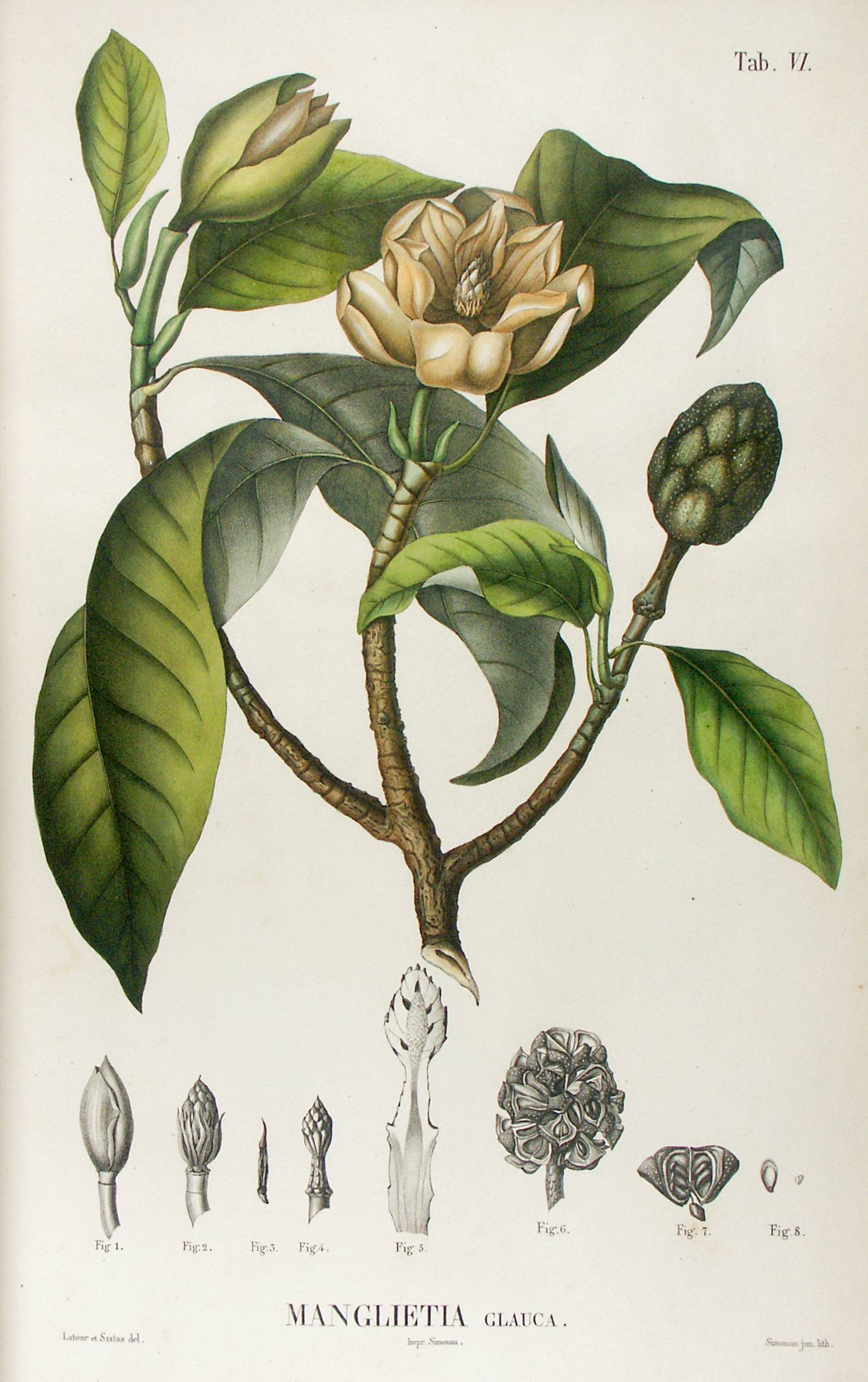
- Magnolia sumatrana var. glauca (as Manglietia glauca) from Blume's Flora Javae

Scientific classification
- Kingdom: Plantae
- Clade: Tracheophytes
- Clade: Angiosperms
- Clade: Magnoliids
- Order: Magnoliales
- Family: Magnoliaceae
- Genus: Magnolia
- Species: M. sumatrana
- Variety: M. s. var. glauca

Trinomial name
- Magnolia sumatrana var. glauca (Blume) Figlar & Noot. (2011)

Synonyms
- Magnolia blumei Prantl (1888); Manglietia glauca Blume (1823)

= Magnolia sumatrana var. glauca =

Variety of flowering plant

Magnolia sumatrana var. glauca is a variety of magnolia that is endemic to Indonesia. It is native to Sumatra, Java, the Lesser Sunda Islands, and Sulawesi.
