= Endoclita makundae =

Scientific classification
- Kingdom: Animalia
- Phylum: Arthropoda
- Class: Insecta
- Order: Lepidoptera
- Family: Hepialidae
- Genus: Endoclita
- Species: E. makundae

Binomial name
- Endoclita makundae Grehan, Mielke & Kunte 2022

Species of Moth

Endoclita makundae is a species of ghost moth (Hepialidae) described from Assam, India in 2022. It has a wingspan of approximately 75 mm (3.0 in). The habitat consists of evergreen and semi-evergreen forest on low relief topography. It was named for the Makunda Christian Leprosy and General Hospital. A noun in the genitive singular meaning "of Makunda".
