= Endoclita aikasama =

Scientific classification
- Kingdom: Animalia
- Phylum: Arthropoda
- Class: Insecta
- Order: Lepidoptera
- Family: Hepialidae
- Genus: Endoclita
- Species: E. aikasama

Binomial name
- Endoclita aikasama Tindale, 1958

Species of moth

Endoclita aikasama is a species of moth of the family Hepialidae. It is known from Java, Indonesia.
