= Endoclita albofasciatus =

Scientific classification
- Kingdom: Animalia
- Phylum: Arthropoda
- Class: Insecta
- Order: Lepidoptera
- Family: Hepialidae
- Genus: Endoclita
- Species: E. albofasciatus

Binomial name
- Endoclita albofasciatus (Moore, 1879)

Synonyms
- Phassus albofasciatus Moore, 1879

Species of moth

Endoclita albofasciatus is a species of moth of the family Hepialidae. It is known from India.
