= Endoclita strobilanthes =

Scientific classification
- Kingdom: Animalia
- Phylum: Arthropoda
- Class: Insecta
- Order: Lepidoptera
- Family: Hepialidae
- Genus: Endoclita
- Species: E. strobilanthes

Binomial name
- Endoclita strobilanthes (Tindale, 1942)

Synonyms
- Sahyadrassus strobilanthes Tindale, 1942

Species of moth

Endoclita strobilanthes is a species of moth of the family Hepialidae. It is known from India.
