= Endoclita chalybeatus =

Scientific classification
- Kingdom: Animalia
- Phylum: Arthropoda
- Class: Insecta
- Order: Lepidoptera
- Family: Hepialidae
- Genus: Endoclita
- Species: E. chalybeatus

Binomial name
- Endoclita chalybeatus (Moore, 1879)

Synonyms
- Phassus chalybeatus Moore, 1879

Species of moth

Endoclita chalybeatus is a species of moth of the family Hepialidae. It is known from India. Food plants for this species include Gmelina, Tectona, and Theobroma.
