= Endoclita inouei =

Scientific classification
- Kingdom: Animalia
- Phylum: Arthropoda
- Class: Insecta
- Order: Lepidoptera
- Family: Hepialidae
- Genus: Endoclita
- Species: E. inouei

Binomial name
- Endoclita inouei Ueda, 1987

Species of moth

Endoclita inouei is a species of moth of the family Hepialidae. It is known from Taiwan.
