= Endoclita nodus =

Scientific classification
- Kingdom: Animalia
- Phylum: Arthropoda
- Class: Insecta
- Order: Lepidoptera
- Family: Hepialidae
- Genus: Endoclita
- Species: E. nodus

Binomial name
- Endoclita nodus (Chu and Wang, 1985)

Synonyms
- Phassus nodus Chu and Wang, 1985

Species of moth

Endoclita nodus is a species of moth of the family Hepialidae. It is found in China (Anhui).
