= Endoclita excrescens =

Scientific classification
- Kingdom: Animalia
- Phylum: Arthropoda
- Class: Insecta
- Order: Lepidoptera
- Family: Hepialidae
- Genus: Endoclita
- Species: E. excrescens

Binomial name
- Endoclita excrescens (Butler, 1877)

Synonyms
- Phassus excrescens Butler, 1877; Phassus aemulus Butler, 1877; Phassus camphorae Sasaki, 1908; Phassus satsumanis Yazaki, 1926; Endoclyta pallescens Tshistjakov, 1996

Species of moth

Endoclita excrescens is a species of moth of the family Hepialidae. It is known from Japan and the Russian Far East. Food plants for this species include Castanea, Nicotiana, Paulownia, Quercus, and Raphanus. The species is considered a pest of the tobacco plant.
