= Endoclita coomani =

Scientific classification
- Kingdom: Animalia
- Phylum: Arthropoda
- Class: Insecta
- Order: Lepidoptera
- Family: Hepialidae
- Genus: Endoclita
- Species: E. coomani

Binomial name
- Endoclita coomani (Viette, 1949)

Synonyms
- Procharagia coomani Viette, 1949

Species of moth

Endoclita coomani is a species of moth of the family Hepialidae. It is known from Vietnam.
