= Endoclita sericeus =

Scientific classification
- Kingdom: Animalia
- Phylum: Arthropoda
- Class: Insecta
- Order: Lepidoptera
- Family: Hepialidae
- Genus: Endoclita
- Species: E. sericeus

Binomial name
- Endoclita sericeus (C. Swinhoe, 1901)

Synonyms
- Phassus sericeus C. Swinhoe, 1901

Species of moth

Endoclita sericeus is a species of moth of the family Hepialidae first described by Charles Swinhoe in 1901. It is known from Java, Indonesia. Food plants for this species include Albizia, Camellia, Cinchona, Crotalaria, Manihot, Tectona, and Theobroma.
