= Manglietia =

Genus of flowering plants

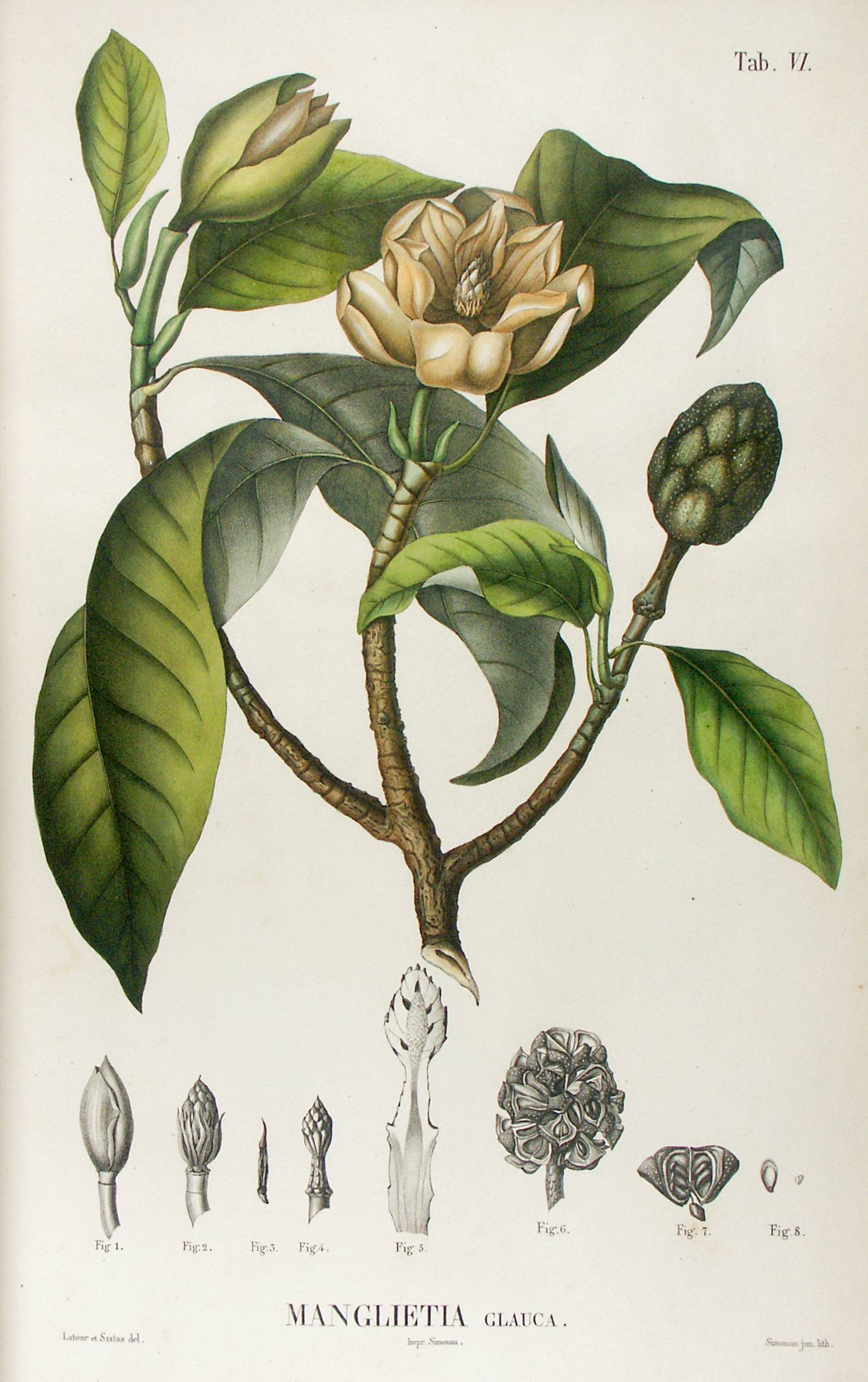
Manglietia glauca (now Magnolia sumatrana var. glauca (Blume) Figlar & Noot.) as illustrated by Blume

Manglietia was the name of a genus of flowering plants in the family Magnoliaceae, with about 40 Asian species listed. The genus is now considered a synonym of the well-known and similar Magnolia.

They are trees with leathery leaves and green or red flowers.

== Species ==
Species with pages here include:

- Manglietia aromatica Dandy is a synonym of Magnolia aromatica (Dandy) VS Kumar
- Manglietia grandis Hu & Cheng is a synonym of Magnolia grandis (Hu & Cheng) VS Kumar
- Manglietia megaphylla Hu & Cheng is a synonym of Magnolia dandyi
- Manglietia ovoidea Hung T. Chang is a synonym of Magnolia ovoidea
- Manglietia sinica (Law) B.L.Chen & Noot. is a synonym of Magnolia sinica
