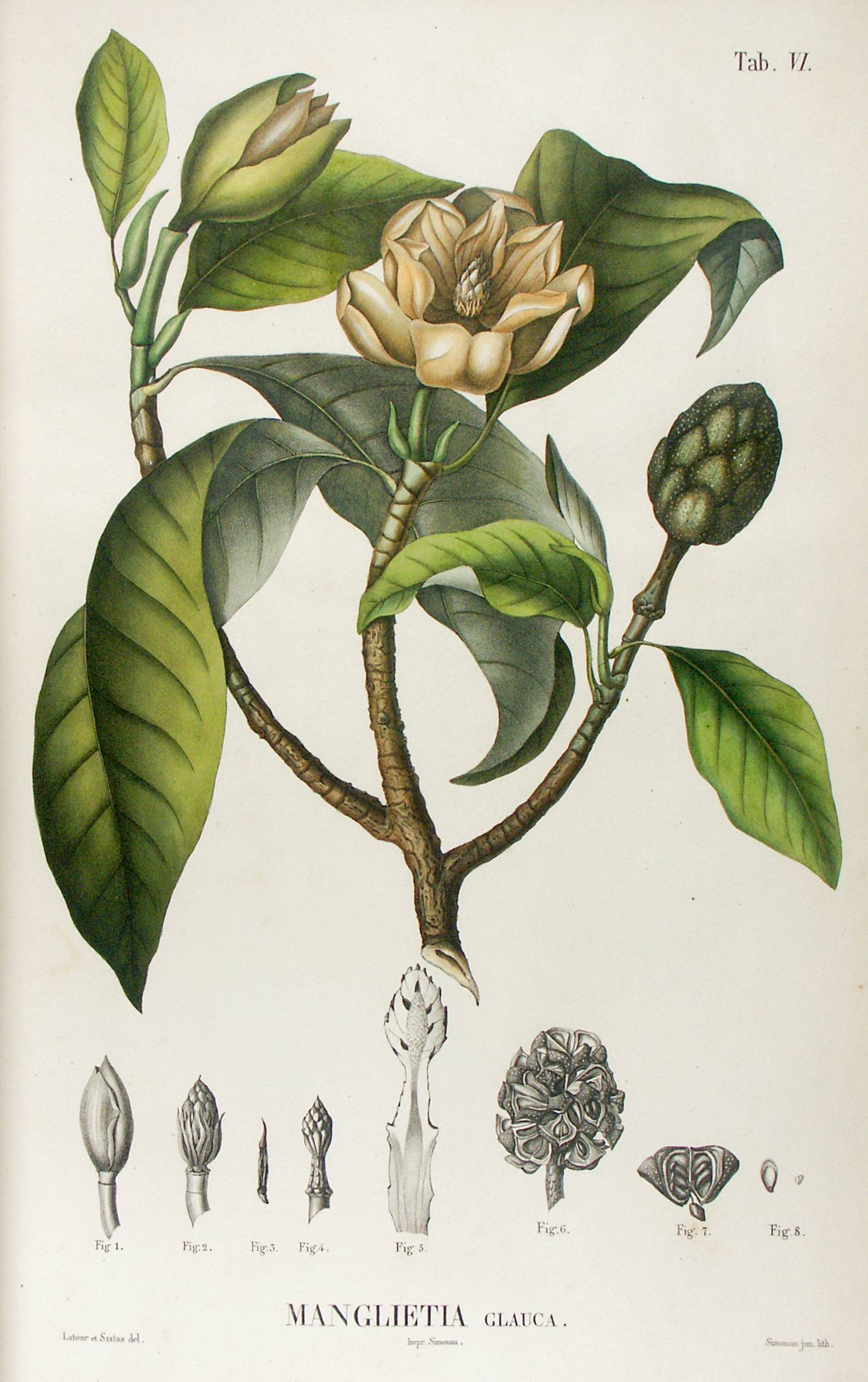
- Magnolia sumatrana var. glauca (as Manglietia glauca) from Blume's Flora Javae

Conservation status
- Least Concern (IUCN 3.1)

Scientific classification
- Kingdom: Plantae
- Clade: Embryophytes
- Clade: Tracheophytes
- Clade: Spermatophytes
- Clade: Angiosperms
- Clade: Magnoliids
- Order: Magnoliales
- Family: Magnoliaceae
- Genus: Magnolia
- Subgenus: Magnolia subg. Magnolia
- Section: Magnolia sect. Manglietia
- Species: M. sumatrana

Binomial name
- Magnolia sumatrana (Miq.) Figlar & Noot. (2011)

Synonyms
- Magnolia blumei var. sumatrana (Miq.) Figlar & Noot. (2004); Manglietia glauca var. sumatrana (Miq.) Dandy (1928); Manglietia sumatrana Miq. (1861)

= Magnolia sumatrana =

Species of flowering plant

Magnolia sumatrana is a species of magnolia that is endemic to Indonesia. It is native to Sumatra, Java, the Lesser Sunda Islands, and Sulawesi.

Two varieties are accepted:

- Magnolia sumatrana var. glauca (Blume) Figlar & Noot. – Sumatra, Java, the Lesser Sunda Islands, and Sulawesi
- Magnolia sumatrana var. sumatrana – western Sumatra
