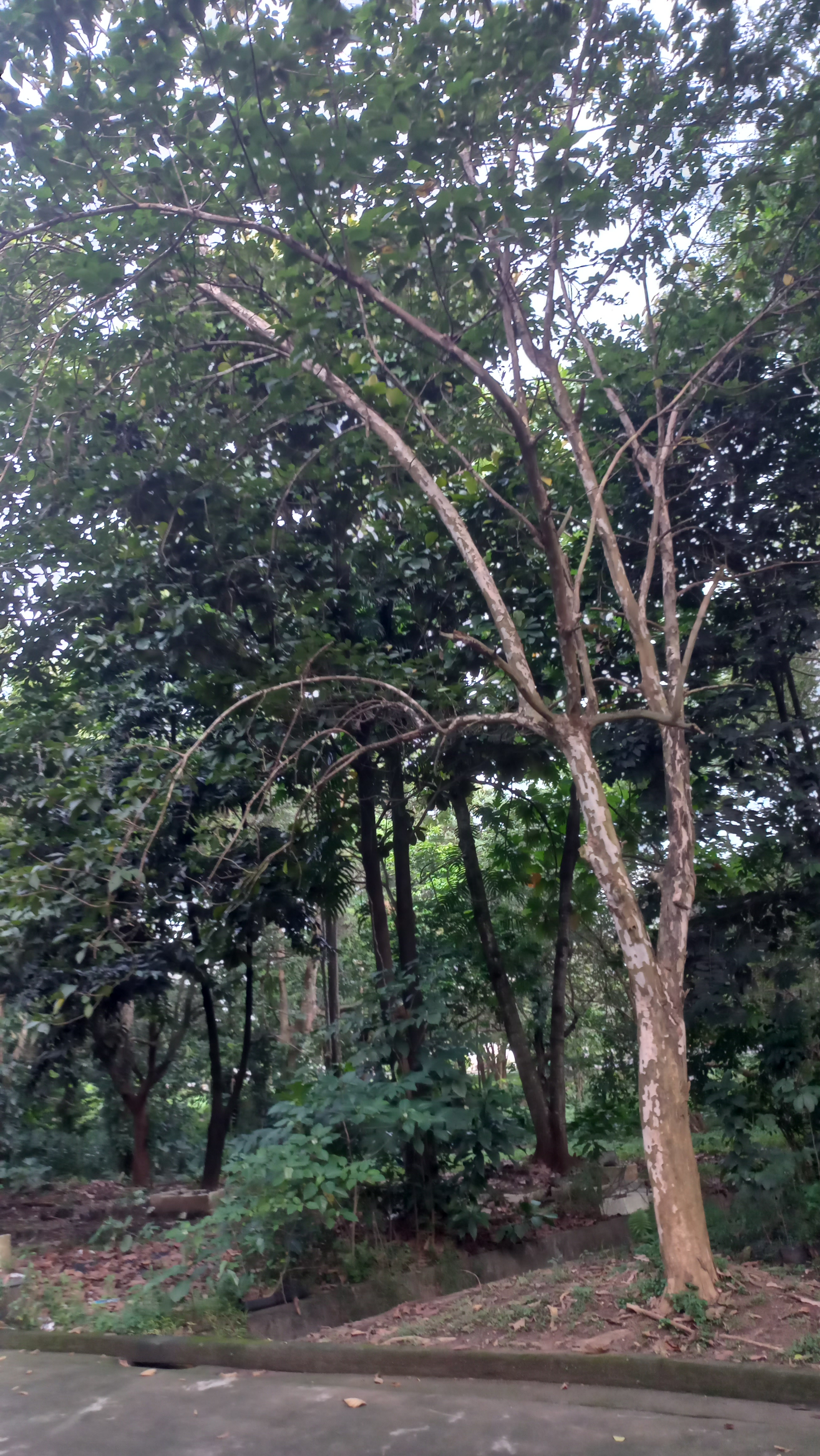

Conservation status
- Endangered (IUCN 3.1)

Scientific classification
- Kingdom: Plantae
- Clade: Tracheophytes
- Clade: Angiosperms
- Clade: Eudicots
- Clade: Asterids
- Order: Lamiales
- Family: Lamiaceae
- Genus: Tectona
- Species: T. philippinensis

Binomial name
- Tectona philippinensis Benth. & Hook.f. ex Merr.

= Tectona philippinensis =

Species of flowering plant

Tectona philippinensis, also called Philippine teak, is a species of plant in the family Lamiaceae, formerly classified in the Verbenaceae. It is endemic to the Philippines. The species is endangered due to land conversion and logging for its timber.
