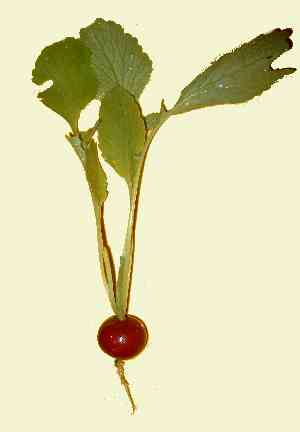
- Red radish

Scientific classification
- Kingdom: Plantae
- Clade: Tracheophytes
- Clade: Angiosperms
- Clade: Eudicots
- Clade: Rosids
- Order: Brassicales
- Family: Brassicaceae
- Genus: Raphanus; L.

Species
- Raphanus caudatus L. 1767; Raphanus confusus Al-Shehbaz & Warwick 1997; Raphanus raphanistrum L. 1753; Raphanus sativus L. 1753

Synonyms
- Dondisia Scop.; Durandea Delarbre; Ormycarpus Neck.; Raphanistrum Tourn. ex Adans.; Raphinastrum Mill.; Rhaphanos St.-Lag.

= Raphanus =

Genus of flowering plants

Raphanus (Ancient Greek for "radish") is a genus within the flowering plant family Brassicaceae.

Carl Linnaeus described three species within the genus: the cultivated radish (Raphanus sativus), the wild radish or jointed charlock (Raphanus raphanistrum), and the rat-tail radish (Raphanus caudatus). Various other species have been proposed (particularly related to the East Asian daikon varieties) and the rat-tail radish is sometimes considered a variety of R. sativus, but no clear consensus has emerged.

Raphanus species grow as annual or biennial plants, with a taproot which is much enlarged in the cultivated radish. Unlike many other genera in the family Brassicaceae, Raphanus has indehiscent fruit that do not split open at maturity to reveal the seeds. The genus is native to Asia, but its members can now be found worldwide. Growing wild, they are regarded as invasive species in many regions.

Raphanus species are used as food plants by the larvae of some Lepidoptera species, including cabbage moth, Endoclita excrescens, the garden carpet, and the nutmeg.

The genomes of Raphanus raphanistrum (wild radish) and Raphanus sativus (cultivated radish) have been sequenced.
