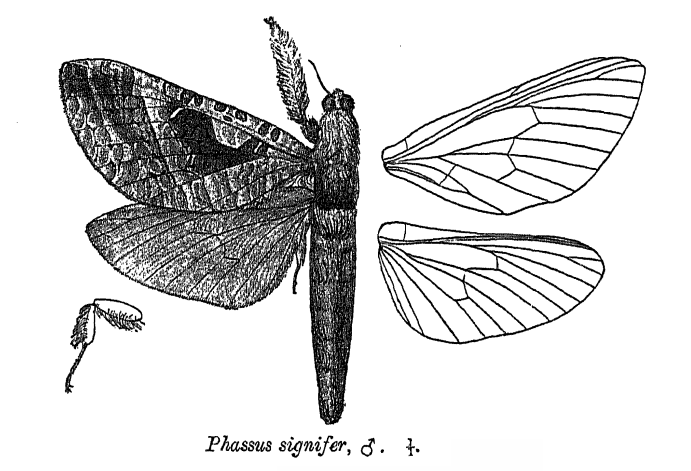

Scientific classification
- Kingdom: Animalia
- Phylum: Arthropoda
- Class: Insecta
- Order: Lepidoptera
- Family: Hepialidae
- Genus: Endoclita
- Species: E. signifer

Binomial name
- Endoclita signifer (Walker, 1856)

Synonyms
- Phassus signifer Walker, 1856; Phassus hunanensis Chu and Wang, 1985

= Endoclita signifer =

Species of moth

Endoclita signifer is a species of moth of the family Hepialidae. It is found in eastern Asia, including Japan, Taiwan, Sylhet, Burma, Borneo and Java.

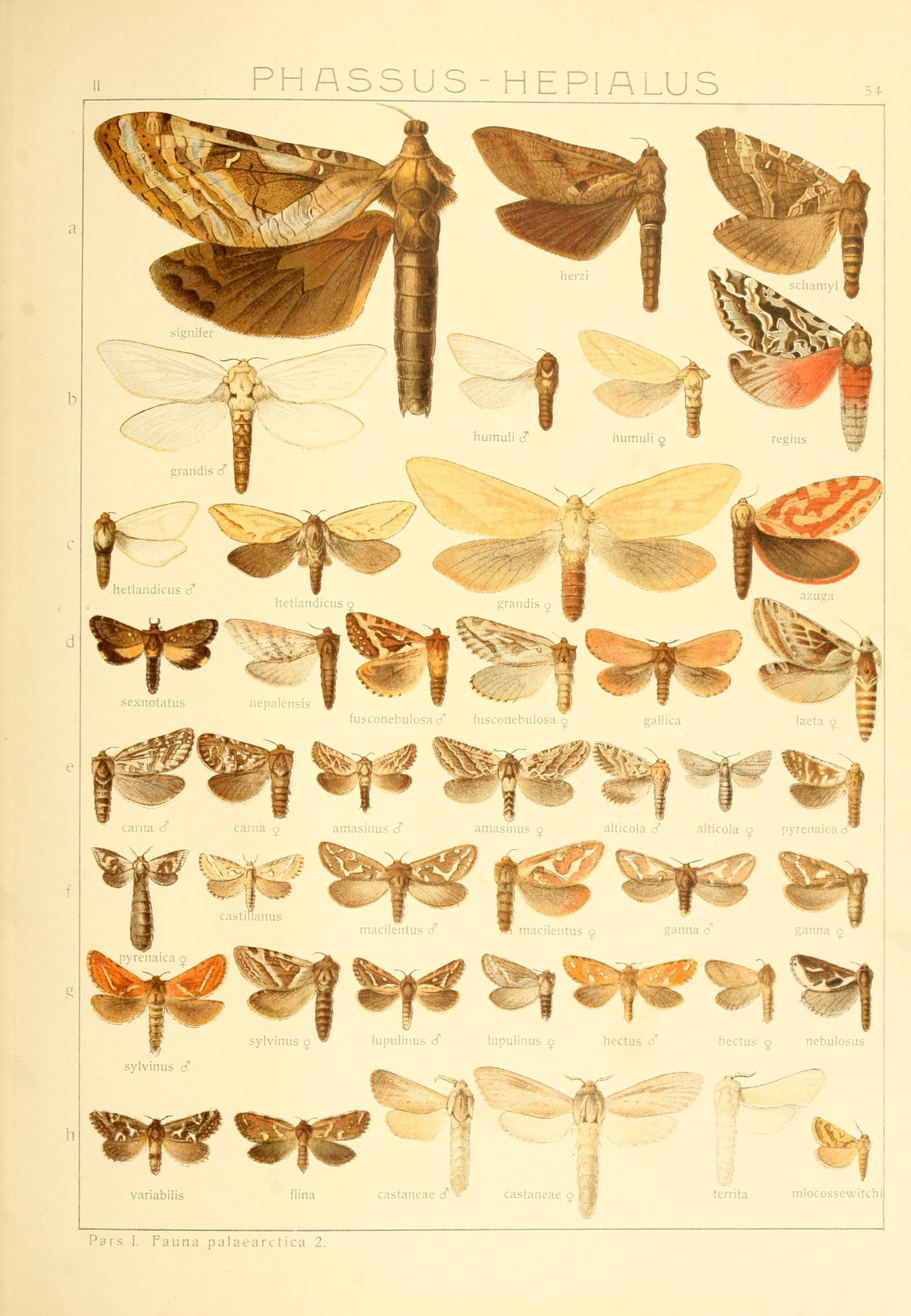
Endoclita signifer in Seitz top left

The larvae bore in Fraxinus species and Paulownia tomentosa. It takes two years to complete its life cycle with adults appearing in September.
