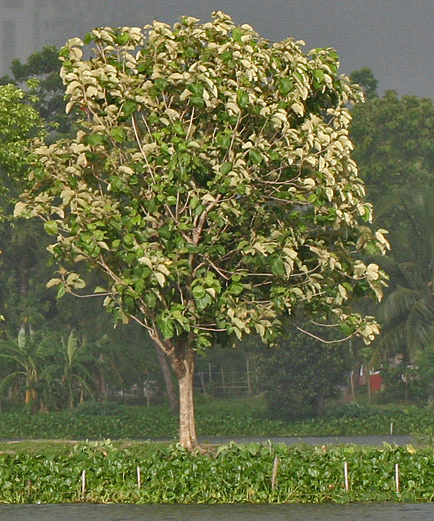
- Tectona grandis in new leaves in Kolkata, West Bengal, India.

Scientific classification
- Kingdom: Plantae
- Clade: Tracheophytes
- Clade: Angiosperms
- Clade: Eudicots
- Clade: Asterids
- Order: Lamiales
- Family: Lamiaceae
- Genus: Tectona; L.f.

Species
- Tectona grandis; Tectona hamiltoniana; Tectona philippinensis

= Tectona =

Genus of trees

Tectona is a genus of tropical hardwood trees in the mint family, Lamiaceae. The three species are often collectively called teak.

== Description ==
Tectona is native to south and southeast Asia, mainly India, Pakistan, Bangladesh, Myanmar, Indonesia and Thailand, and are commonly found as a component of monsoon forest vegetation. They are large trees, growing to 30–40 m (90–120 ft.) tall, deciduous in the dry season. Tectona grandis is an economically important species which is the source of most commercial teak wood products.

== Systematics ==
Teak belongs to the family Lamiaceae (in older classifications in Verbenaceae). Sometimes it is included in the subfamily Prostantheroideae. There are three species of Tectona:

- Tectona grandis (common teak) is by far the most important, with a wide distribution in Bangladesh, Sri Lanka, Myanmar, Thailand, China, India, and Pakistan.
- Tectona hamiltoniana (Dahat teak) is a local endemic species confined to Burma, where it is endangered.
- Tectona philippinensis (Philippine teak) is endemic to the Philippines, and is critically endangered according to the IUCN (http://iucnredlist.org/details/32123/0).

The genus Tectona is a conserved name against the earlier homotypic synonym Theka Adans. The genus was originally described by Carl Linnaeus the Younger in 1782.

== Notable examples ==
The biggest and oldest teak is in Uttaradit, Thailand. It is more than 1,500 years old. Its height is 47 metres.
