= List of Amomum species =

As of June 2024 Plants of the World Online recognises 111 species in the genus Amomum, as follows:

- Amomum alborubellum K.Schum. & Lauterb.
- Amomum ampliflorum Y.H.Tan & H.B.Ding
- Amomum andamanicum V.P.Thomas, Dan & M.Sabu
- Amomum apiculatum K.Schum.
- Amomum aquaticum Raeusch.
- Amomum argyrophyllum Ridl.
- Amomum arunachalense Hareesh & M.Sabu
- Amomum bicornutum Ridl.
- Amomum bilabiatum S.Sakai & Nagam.
- Amomum billburttii Škorničk. & Hlavatá
- Amomum biphyllum (Saensouk & P.Saensouk) Škorničk. & Hlavatá
- Amomum calcicola Lamxay & M.F.Newman
- Amomum carnosum V.P.Thomas & M.Sabu
- Amomum centrocephalum A.D.Poulsen
- Amomum cephalotes Ridl.
- Amomum chaunocephalum K.Schum.
- Amomum chayanianum (Yupparach) Škorničk. & Hlavatá
- Amomum chevalieri Gagnep. ex Lamxay
- Amomum chong-eui (C.K.Lim) Škorničk. & Hlavatá
- Amomum chryseum Lamxay & M.F.Newman
- Amomum cinnamomeum Škorničk., Luu & H.Ð.Trần
- Amomum corrugatum Škorničk., H.Ð.Trần & Luu
- Amomum curtisii (Baker) Škorničk. & Hlavatá
- Amomum dampuianum V.P.Thomas, M.Sabu & Lalramngh.
- Amomum deuteramomum K.Schum.
- Amomum diphyllum (K.Schum.) Škorničk. & Hlavatá
- Amomum dolichanthum D.Fang
- Amomum echinatum Willd.
- Amomum elan (C.K.Lim) Škorničk. & Hlavatá
- Amomum erythranthum Y.H.Tan & H.B.Ding
- Amomum exertum (Scort.) Škorničk. & Hlavatá
- Amomum fangdingii X.E.Ye, Škorničk. & N.H.Xia
- Amomum flavorubellum K.Schum. & Lauterb.
- Amomum foetidum Boonma & Saensouk
- Amomum fragile S.Q.Tong
- Amomum fragrans Škorničk. & Hlavatá
- Amomum glabrum S.Q.Tong
- Amomum globba J.F.Gmel.
- Amomum gymnopodum K.Schum.
- Amomum hainanense Y.S.Ye, J.P.Liao & P.Zou
- Amomum hochreutineri Valeton
- Amomum hypoleucum Thwaites
- Amomum johorense (C.K.Lim) Škorničk. & Hlavatá
- Amomum kerbyi (R.M.Sm.) Škorničk. & Hlavatá
- Amomum kingii Baker
- Amomum kwangsiense D.Fang & X.X.Chen
- Amomum lacteum Ridl.
- Amomum lagarophyllum Škorničk. & Hlavatá
- Amomum laoticum Gagnep.
- Amomum latiflorum (Ridl.) Škorničk. & Hlavatá
- Amomum limianum (Picheans. & Yupparach) Škorničk. & Hlavatá
- Amomum longipes Valeton
- Amomum longipetiolatum Merr.
- Amomum lutescens Luu & Škorničk.
- Amomum luzonense Elmer
- Amomum macrodons Scort.
- Amomum maximum Roxb.
- Amomum meghalayense V.P.Thomas, M.Sabu & Sanoj
- Amomum menglaense S.Q.Tong
- Amomum mengtzense H.T.Tsai & P.S.Chen
- Amomum miriflorum Škorničk. & Q.B.Nguyen
- Amomum mizanianum (C.K.Lim) Škorničk. & Hlavatá
- Amomum monophyllum Gagnep.
- Amomum nagamiense V.P.Thomas & M.Sabu
- Amomum nemorale (Thwaites) Trimen
- Amomum nimkeyense M.Sabu, Hareesh, Tatum & A.K.Das
- Amomum odontocarpum D.Fang
- Amomum odoratum Škorničk. & Aver.
- Amomum pellitum Ridl.
- Amomum petaloideum (S.Q.Tong) T.L.Wu
- Amomum plicatum Lamxay & M.F.Newman
- Amomum poonsakianum (Picheans. & Yupparach) Škorničk. & Hlavatá
- Amomum pratisthana J.Sarma, S.Dey, C.K.Salunkhe & Barbhuiya
- Amomum prionocarpum Lamxay & M.F.Newman
- Amomum procurrens Gagnep.
- Amomum puberulum (Ridl.) Škorničk. & Hlavatá
- Amomum purpureorubrum S.Q.Tong & Y.M.Xia
- Amomum putrescens D.Fang
- Amomum queenslandicum R.M.Sm.
- Amomum ranongense (Picheans. & Yupparach) Škorničk. & Hlavatá
- Amomum raoi V.P.Thomas & M.Sabu
- Amomum repoeense Pierre ex Gagnep.
- Amomum riwatchii M.Sabu & Hareesh
- Amomum robertsonii Craib
- Amomum rugosum (Y.K.Kam) Škorničk. & Hlavatá
- Amomum sabuanum V.P.Thomas, Nissar & U.Gupta
- Amomum schistocalyx Y.H.Tan & H.B.Ding
- Amomum schlechteri K.Schum.
- Amomum sericeum Roxb.
- Amomum siamense Craib
- Amomum slahmong (C.K.Lim) Škorničk. & Hlavatá
- Amomum smithiae (Y.K.Kam) Škorničk. & Hlavatá
- Amomum spathilabium Kaewsri
- Amomum stenocarpum Valeton
- Amomum stenosiphon K.Schum.
- Amomum subcapitatum Y.M.Xia
- Amomum subulatum Roxb.
- Amomum sumatranum (Valeton) Škorničk. & Hlavatá
- Amomum tephrodelphys K.Schum.
- Amomum terminale Ridl.
- Amomum tibeticum (T.L.Wu & S.J.Chen) X.E.Ye, L.Bai & N.H.Xia
- Amomum trianthemum K.Schum.
- Amomum trichanthera Warb.
- Amomum trilobum Gagnep.
- Amomum unifolium Gagnep.
- Amomum velutinum X.E.Ye, Škorničk. & N.H.Xia
- Amomum wandokthong (Picheans. & Yupparach) Škorničk. & Hlavatá
- Amomum warburgianum K.Schum. & Lauterb.
- Amomum warburgii (K.Schum.) K.Schum.
- Amomum xizangense L.Fu, Jian-P.Huang & Y.S.Ye
- Amomum yingjiangense S.Q.Tong & Y.M.Xia
