= Amomum ovoideum =

Conservation status
- Least Concern (IUCN 3.1)

Scientific classification
- Kingdom: Plantae
- Clade: Embryophytes
- Clade: Tracheophytes
- Clade: Angiosperms
- Clade: Monocots
- Clade: Commelinids
- Order: Zingiberales
- Family: Zingiberaceae
- Genus: Amomum
- Species: A. ovoideum

Binomial name
- Amomum ovoideum Pierre ex Gagnep.

Synonyms
- Amomum uliginosum J.Koenig; Amomum robustum K.Schum.; Cardamomum uliginosum (J.Koenig) Kuntze; Wurfbainia uliginosa (J.Koenig) Giseke

Species of plant

Amomum ovoideum is a widespread shade-demanding rhizomatous herb of the ginger family (Zingiberaceae) native to Southeast Asia. The plant bears fruits up to 2 cm (0.79 in) long, covered by slender, soft, red spines. When dried, the fruit produces cardamom seedpods similar to other cardamom spice plants.

== Distribution ==
A. ovoideum is associated with dense and semi-dense forest habitats in Southeast Asia and is found growing in the wild in Myanmar, Thailand, Cambodia, Laos, Vietnam, Malaysia, and Indonesia.

The habitat of A. ovoideum is mainly lowland evergreen and deciduous forests, but also in evergreen montane forests; it has been observed growing at 30 to 1,550 m (98 to 5,085 ft) above sea level.

In northern Laos, it is one of the most commonly found Amomum species along with A. villosum, and is locally known as "green cardamom". In Cambodia, it is known as krakao and in Thailand as reo daeng.

== Uses ==
A. ovoideum is considered a nontimber forest product in most of its range. In Laos and Cambodia, the fruits and seeds are collected and used both in traditional medicine and cooking. In traditional Cambodian medicine, it is used to treat respiratory problems and digestive disorders.

Generally, the plant is mostly harvested for its fruits and seeds on a seasonal basis only. In some areas, however, the entire plant is harvested; the rhizome is consumed and leaves are occasionally used for temporary shelters. The whole plant is sometimes used in traditional medicine, such as post partum saunas.

== Conservation ==
A. ovoideum is generally not considered a threatened species. However, several activities in larger parts of its range strain it and it is a species in decline.

The direct harvest of the plant, usually only comprises the fruit and seeds, but occasionally the whole plant is harvested.

In Southeast Asia, herbal medicines and culinary plants are in high local demand and important for the local economies. This has led to a general overharvest of wild plants in the region. With the addition of heavy deforestation (present and past) in all of Southeast Asia, a strain has been put on many wild-growing medicinal and aromatic plants. In the 2000s, this situation led to a large-scale project of introducing sustainable wild harvesting by the FairWild Foundation, known as the ISSC-MAP system. This project also comprises A. ovoidenum in Cambodia. Local wild-harvesters and producers benefits by learning improved techniques, which in turn enhance product quality and market value.
