= Cardamom =

Spice

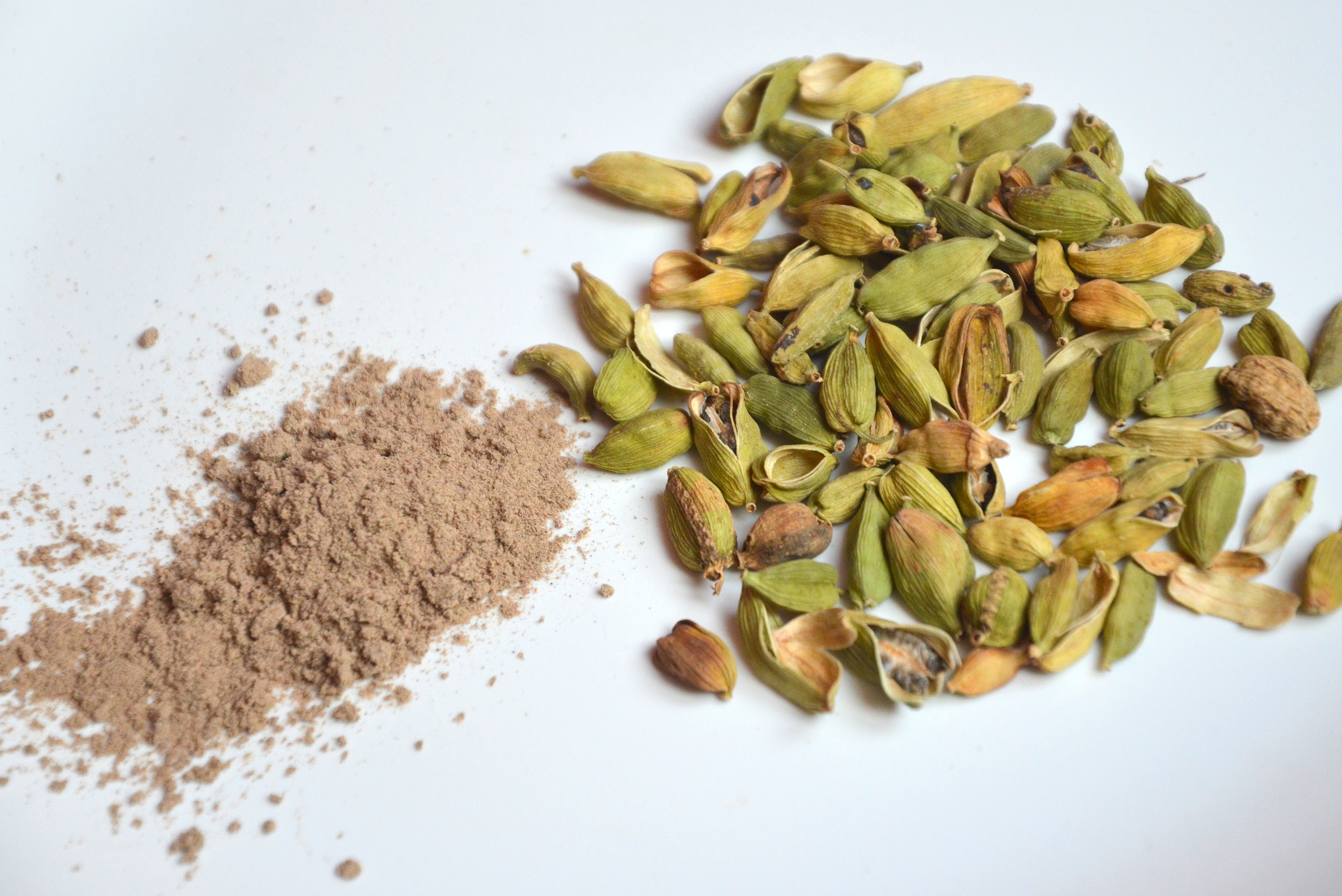
- Cardamom powder and pods
- Source plant(s): Elettaria cardamomum, Amomum subulatum
- Part(s) of plant: Seed
- Uses: Flavoring, spice

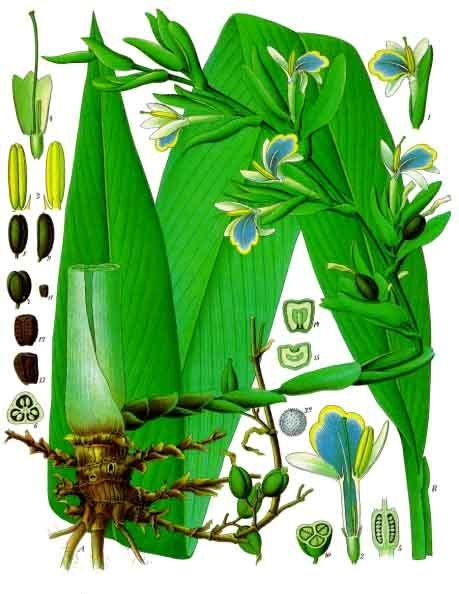
True cardamom plant (Elettaria cardamomum)

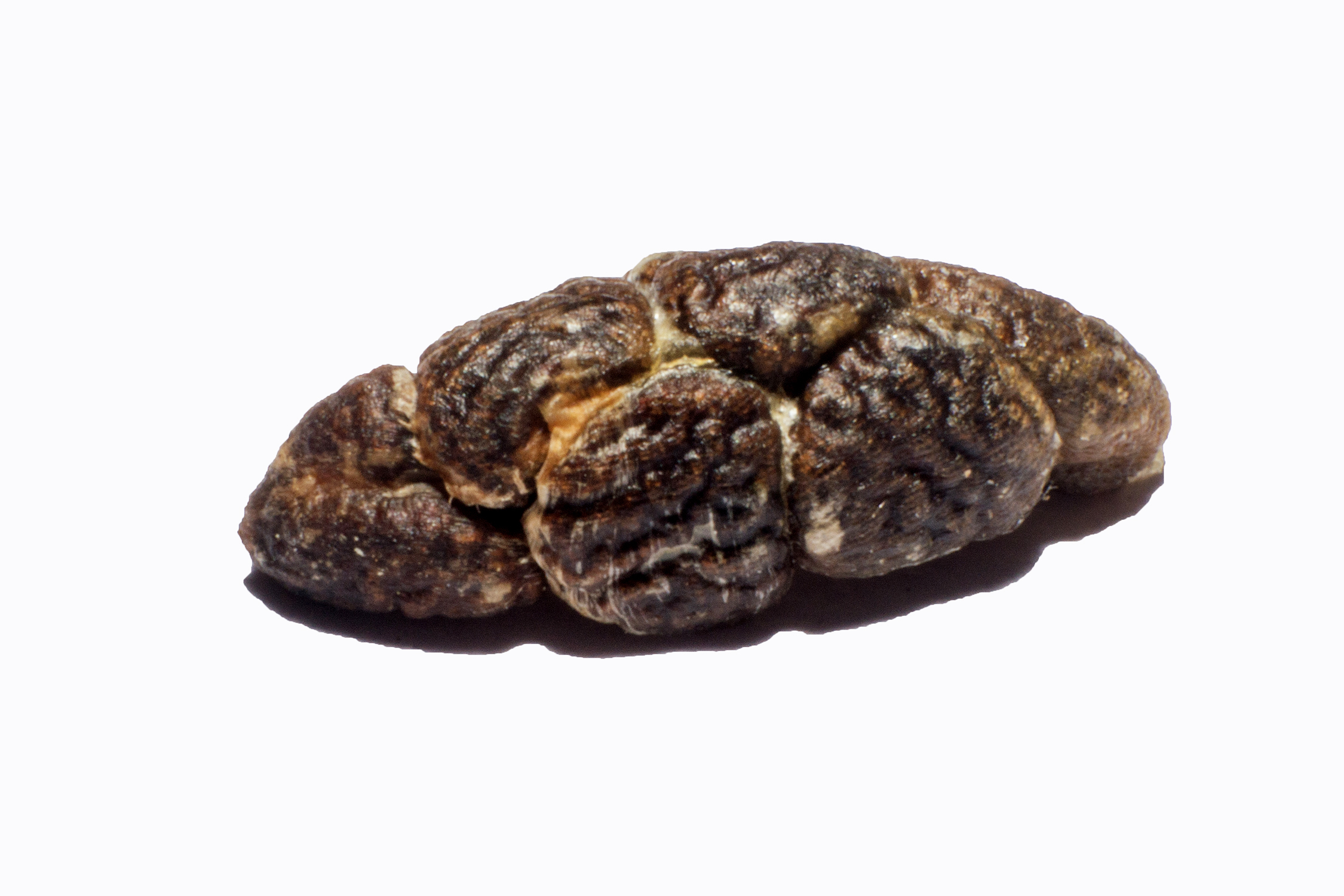
Cardamom seeds

Cardamom (/ˈkɑːrdəməm/), sometimes cardamon or cardamum, is a spice made from the seeds of several plants in the genera Elettaria and Amomum in the family Zingiberaceae. Both genera are native to the Indian subcontinent and Indonesia. They are recognized by their small seed pods: triangular in cross-section and spindle-shaped, with a thin, papery outer shell and small, black seeds; Elettaria pods are light green and smaller, while Amomum pods are dark brown and larger.

Species used for cardamom are native throughout tropical and subtropical Asia. The first references to cardamom are found in Sumer, and in Ayurveda. In the 21st century, it is cultivated mainly in India, Indonesia, and Guatemala.

== Etymology ==
The word cardamom is derived from the Latin cardamōmum, as a Latinisation of the Greek καρδάμωμον (kardámōmon), a compound of κάρδαμον (kárdamon, "cress") and ἄμωμον (ámōmon), of unknown origin.

The earliest attested form of the word κάρδαμον signifying "cress" is the Mycenaean Greek ka-da-mi-ja, written in Linear B syllabic script, in the list of flavorings on the spice tablets found among palace archives in the House of the Sphinxes in Mycenae.

The modern genus name Elettaria is derived from the root ēlam attested in Dravidian languages.

== Types and distribution ==
The two main types of cardamom are:

- True or green cardamom (or white cardamom when bleached) comes from the species Elettaria cardamomum and is distributed from India to Malaysia.
- Black cardamom, also known as brown, greater, large, longer, or Nepal cardamom, comes from the species Amomum subulatum and is native to the eastern Himalayas and mostly cultivated in Eastern Nepal, Sikkim, and parts of Darjeeling district in West Bengal of India, and southern Bhutan.

Other related culinary plants known as cardamom:

- Siam cardamom, Wurfbainia vera, often referred to as white cardamon.
- Ethiopian cardamom, Aframomum corrorima.
- Tavoy cardamom, Wurfbainia villosa var. xanthioides
- red cardamom or cǎoguǒ, Lanxangia tsaoko
- round or Java cardamom, Wurfbainia compacta

== Uses ==
All the above-listed types of cardamom are used as flavorings and/or cooking spices in food and drink. E. cardamomum (green cardamom) is used as a spice, a masticatory, or is smoked.

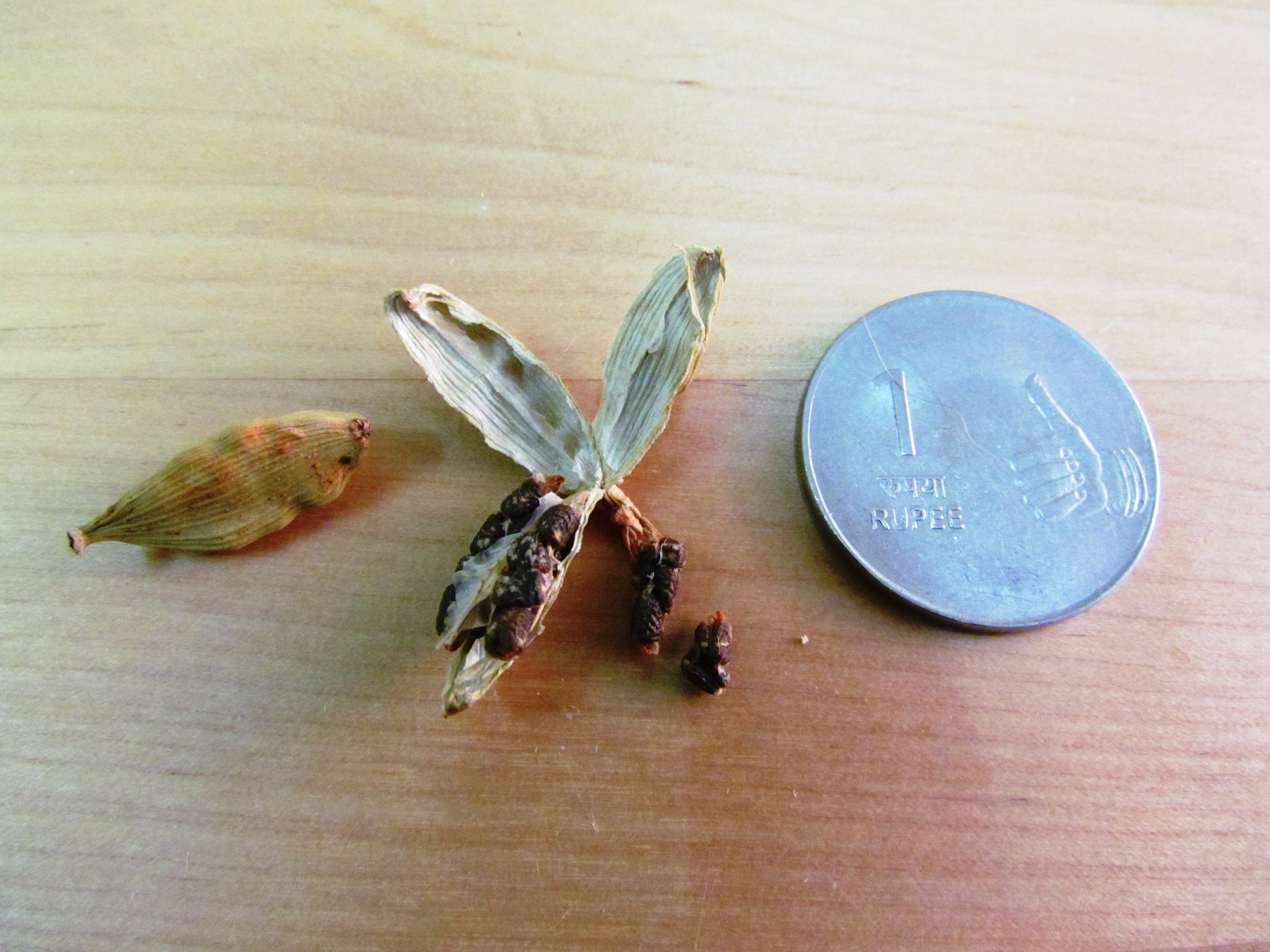
Intact and opened cardamom pods, showing the seeds (20mm Indian 1-rupee coin for scale)

=== Food and beverage ===
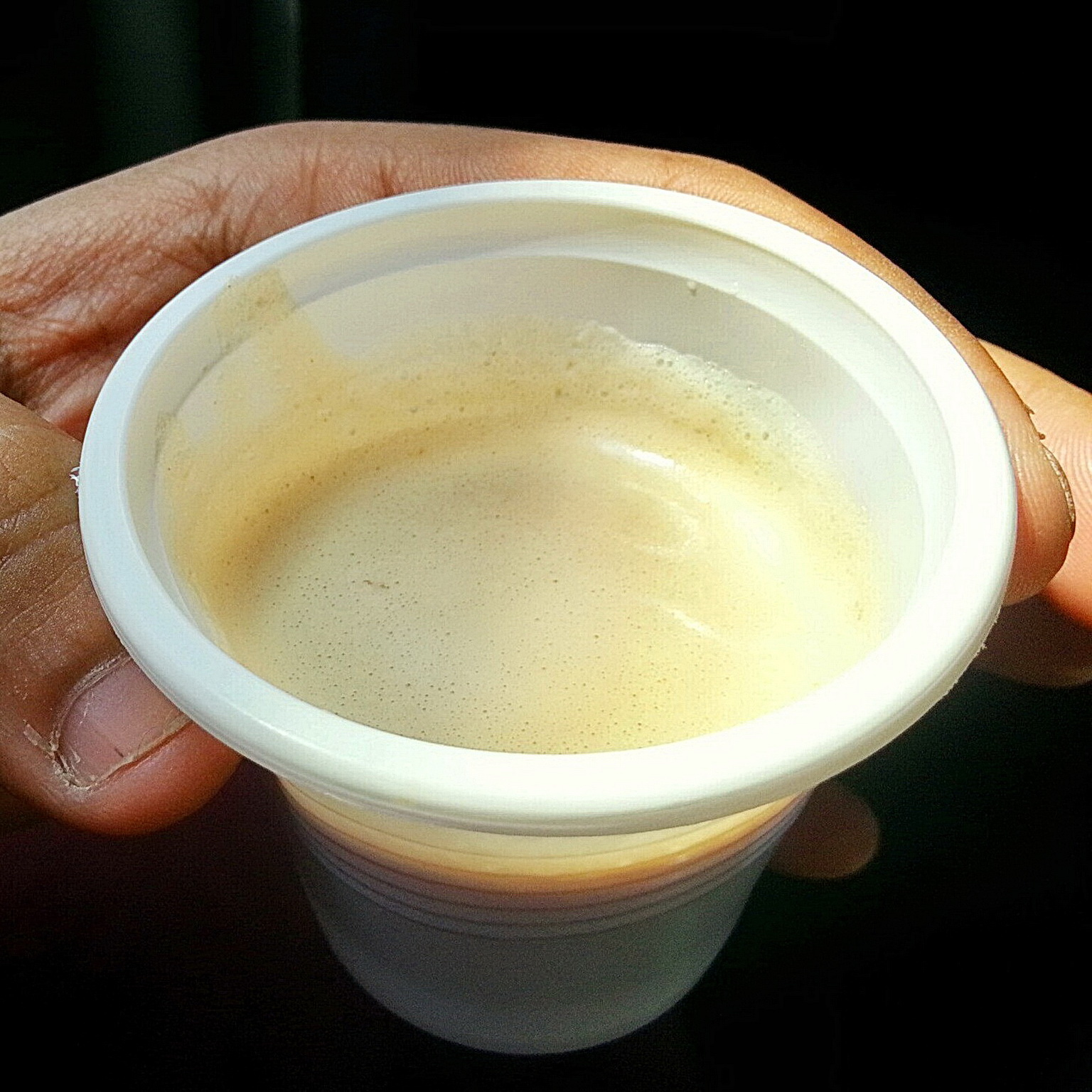
Besides use as flavourant and spice in foods, cardamom-flavoured tea, also flavoured with cinnamon, is consumed as a hot beverage

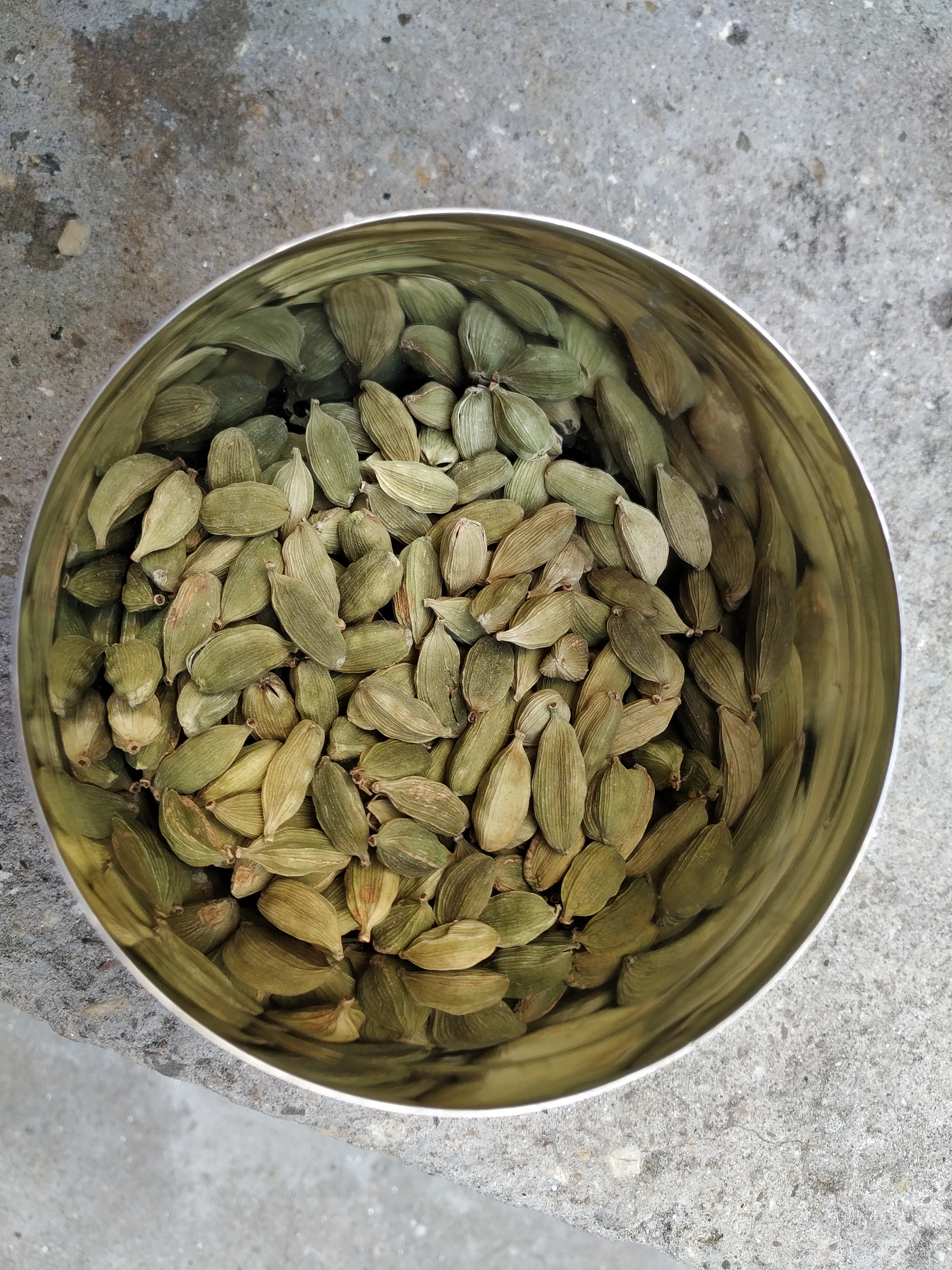
Cardamom (Elaichi) from India

Cardamom has a strong taste, with an aromatic, resinous fragrance. Black cardamom has a more smoky – though not bitter – aroma, with a coolness comparable to mint.

Green cardamom is one of the most expensive spices by weight, but little is needed to impart flavor. It is best stored in the pod, as exposed or ground seeds quickly lose their flavor. Grinding the pods and seeds together lowers both the quality and the price. For recipes requiring whole cardamom pods, a generally accepted equivalent is 10 pods equal 1 1/2 teaspoons (7.4 ml (0.26 imp fl oz; 0.25 US fl oz)) of ground cardamom.

Cardamom is a common ingredient in Indian cooking. It is also often used in baking in the Nordic countries, in particular in Sweden, Norway, and Finland, where it is used in traditional treats such as the Scandinavian Yule bread Julekake, the Swedish Kardemummabullar sweet bun, and Finnish sweet bread pulla. In the Middle East, green cardamom powder is used as a spice for sweet dishes, and as a traditional flavouring in coffee and tea. Cardamom is used to a wide extent in savoury dishes. In some Middle Eastern countries, coffee and cardamom are often ground in a wooden mortar, a mihbaj, and cooked together in a skillet, a mehmas, over wood or gas, to produce mixtures with up to 40% cardamom.

In Asia, both types of cardamom are widely used in both sweet and savoury dishes, particularly in the south. Both are frequent components in such spice mixes as Indian and Nepali masalas, Thai curry pastes, and Yemeni hawaij. Green cardamom is often used in traditional Indian sweets and in masala chai (spiced tea). Both are also often used as a garnish in basmati rice and other dishes. Individual seeds are sometimes chewed and used in much the same way as chewing gum. It is used by confectionery giant Wrigley; its Eclipse Breeze Exotic Mint packaging indicates the product contains "cardamom to neutralize the toughest breath odors". It is also included in aromatic bitters, gin, and herbal teas.

In Korea, Tavoy cardamom (Wurfbainia villosa var. xanthioides) and red cardamom (Lanxangia tsao-ko) are used in tea called jeho-tang.

=== Composition ===
The essential oil content of cardamom seeds depends on storage conditions and may be as high as 8%. The oil is typically 45% α-terpineol, 27% myrcene, 8% limonene, 6% menthone, 3% β-phellandrene, 2% 1,8-cineol, 2% sabinene and 2% heptane. Other sources report the following contents: 1,8-cineol (20 to 50%), α-terpenylacetate (30%), sabinene, limonene (2 to 14%), and borneol.

In the seeds of round cardamom from Java (Wurfbainia compacta), the content of essential oil is lower (2 to 4%), and the oil contains mainly 1,8-cineol (up to 70%) plus β-pinene (16%); furthermore, α-pinene, α-terpineol and humulene are found.

== Production ==
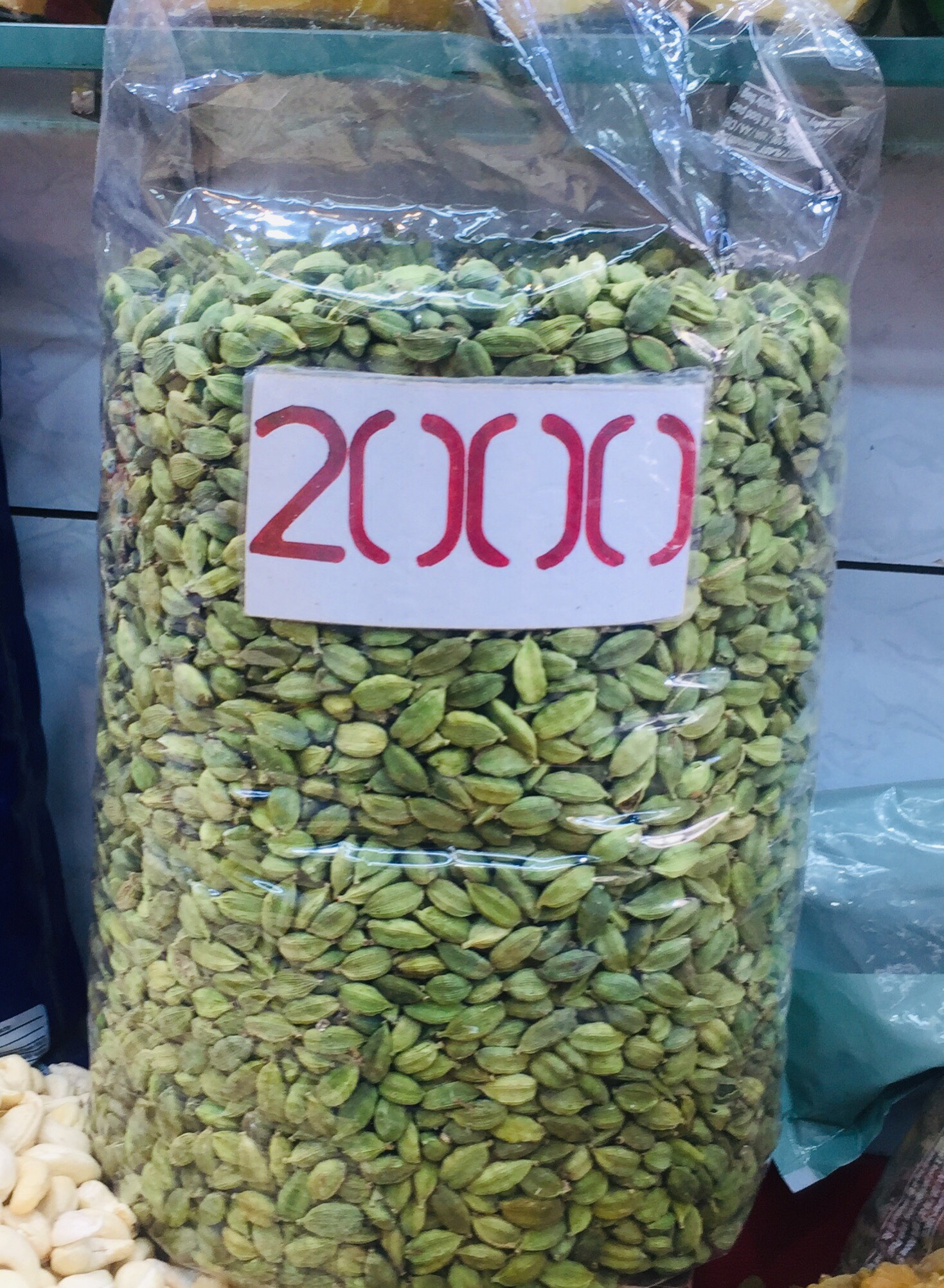
Cardamom sale ₹2000/kg at khari boali market, Delhi

Cardamom production – 2022
Country	Production (tonnes)
India	41,000
Indonesia	40,565
Guatemala	36,407
World	138,888
Source: Food and Agriculture Organization of the United Nations, Statistical Division (FAOSTAT)

In 2022, world production of cardamom (included with nutmeg and mace for reporting to the United Nations) was 138,888 tonnes, led by India, Indonesia and Guatemala, which together accounted for 85% of the total (table).

=== Production practices ===
According to Nair (2011), in the years when India achieves a good crop, it is still less productive than Guatemala. Other notable producers include Costa Rica, El Salvador, Honduras, Papua New Guinea, Sri Lanka, Tanzania, Thailand, and Vietnam.

Much production of cardamom in India is cultivated on private property or in areas the government leases out to farmers. Traditionally, small plots of land within the forests (called eld-kandies) where the wild or acclimatised plant existed are cleared during February and March. Brushwood is cut and burned, and the roots of powerful weeds are torn up to free the soil. Soon after clearing, cardamom plants spring up. After two years the cardamom plants may have eight-to-ten leaves and reach 30 cm (1 ft) in height. In the third year, they may be 120 cm (4 ft) in height. In the following May or June the ground is again weeded, and by September to November a light crop is obtained. In the fourth year, weeding again occurs, and if the cardamoms grow less than 180 cm (6 ft) apart a few are transplanted to new positions. The plants bear for three or four years; and historically the life of each plantation was about eight or nine years. In Malabar the seasons run a little later than in Mysore, and – according to some reports – a full crop may be obtained in the third year. Cardamoms grown above 600 m (2,000 ft) elevation are considered to be of higher quality than those grown below that altitude.

Plants may be raised from seed or by division of the rhizome. In about a year, the seedlings reach about 30 cm (1 ft) in length, and are ready for transplantation. The flowering season is April to May, and after swelling in August and September, by the first half of October usually attain the desired degree of ripening. The crop is accordingly gathered in October and November, and in exceptionally moist weather, the harvest protracts into December. At the time of harvesting, the scapes or shoots bearing the clusters of fruits are broken off close to the stems and placed in baskets lined with fresh leaves. The fruits are spread out on carefully prepared floors, sometimes covered with mats, and are then exposed to the sun. Four or five days of careful drying and bleaching in the sun is usually enough. In rainy weather, drying with artificial heat is necessary, though the fruits suffer greatly in colour; they are consequently sometimes bleached with steam and sulphurous vapour or with ritha nuts.

The industry is highly labour-intensive, each hectare requiring considerable maintenance throughout the year. Production constraints include recurring climate vagaries, the absence of regular re-plantation, and ecological conditions associated with deforestation.

=== Cultivation ===
In 1873 and 1874, Ceylon (now Sri Lanka) exported about 4,100 kg (9,000 lb) each year. In 1877, Ceylon exported 5,039 kg (11,108 lb), in 1879, 8,043 kg (17,732 lb), and in the 1881–82 season, 10,490 kg (23,127 lb) In 1903, 1,600 hectares (4,000 acres) of cardamom growing areas were owned by European planters. The produce of the Travancore plantations was given as 290,000 kg (650,000 lb), or just a little under that of Ceylon. The yield of the Mysore plantations was approximately 91,000 kg (200,000 lb), and the cultivation was mainly in Kadur district. The volume for 1903–04 stated the value of the cardamoms exported to have been Rs. 3,37,000 as compared with Rs. 4,16,000 the previous year. India, which ranks second in world production, recorded a decline of 6.7 percent in cardamom production for 2012–13, and projected a production decline of 30–40% in 2013–14, compared with the previous year due to unfavorable weather. In India, the state of Kerala is by far the most productive producer, with the districts of Idukki, Palakkad and Wynad being the principal producing areas. Given that a number of bureaucrats have personal interests in the industry, in India, several organisations have been set up to protect cardamom producers such as the Cardamom Growers Association (est. 1992) and the Kerala Cardamom Growers Association (est. 1974). Research in India's cardamom plantations began in the 1970s while Kizhekethil Chandy held the office of Chairman of the Cardamom Board. The Kerala Land Reforms Act imposed restrictions on the size of certain agricultural holdings per household to the benefit of cardamom producers.

In 1979–1980, Guatemala surpassed India in worldwide production. Guatemala cultivates Elettaria cardamomum, which is native to the Malabar Coast of India. Alta Verapaz Department produces 70 percent of Guatemala's cardamom. Cardamom was introduced to Guatemala before World War I by the German coffee planter Oscar Majus Kloeffer. After World War II, production was increased to 13,000 to 14,000 tons annually.

The average annual income for a plantation-owning household in 1998 was US$3,408. Although the typical harvest requires over 210 days of labor per year, most cardamom farmers are better off than many other agricultural workers, and there are a significant number of those from the upper strata of society involved in the cultivation process. Increased demand since the 1980s, principally from China, for both Wurfbainia villosa and Lanxangia tsao-ko, has provided a key source of income for poor farmers living at higher altitudes in localized areas of China, Laos, and Vietnam, people typically isolated from many other markets. Laos exports about 400 tonnes annually through Thailand according to the Food and Agriculture Organization of the United Nations (FAO).

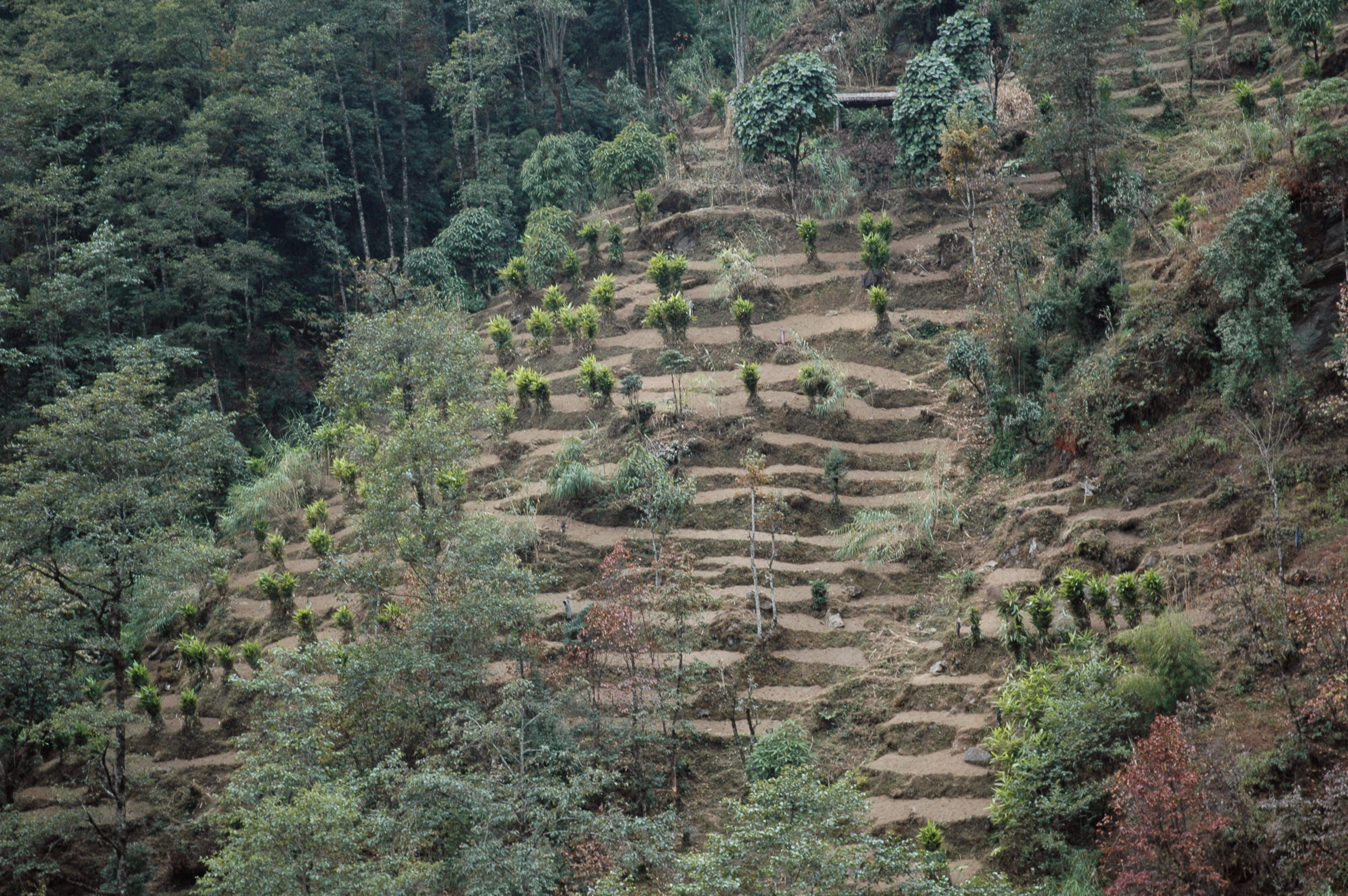
Terraced cardamom plants in India

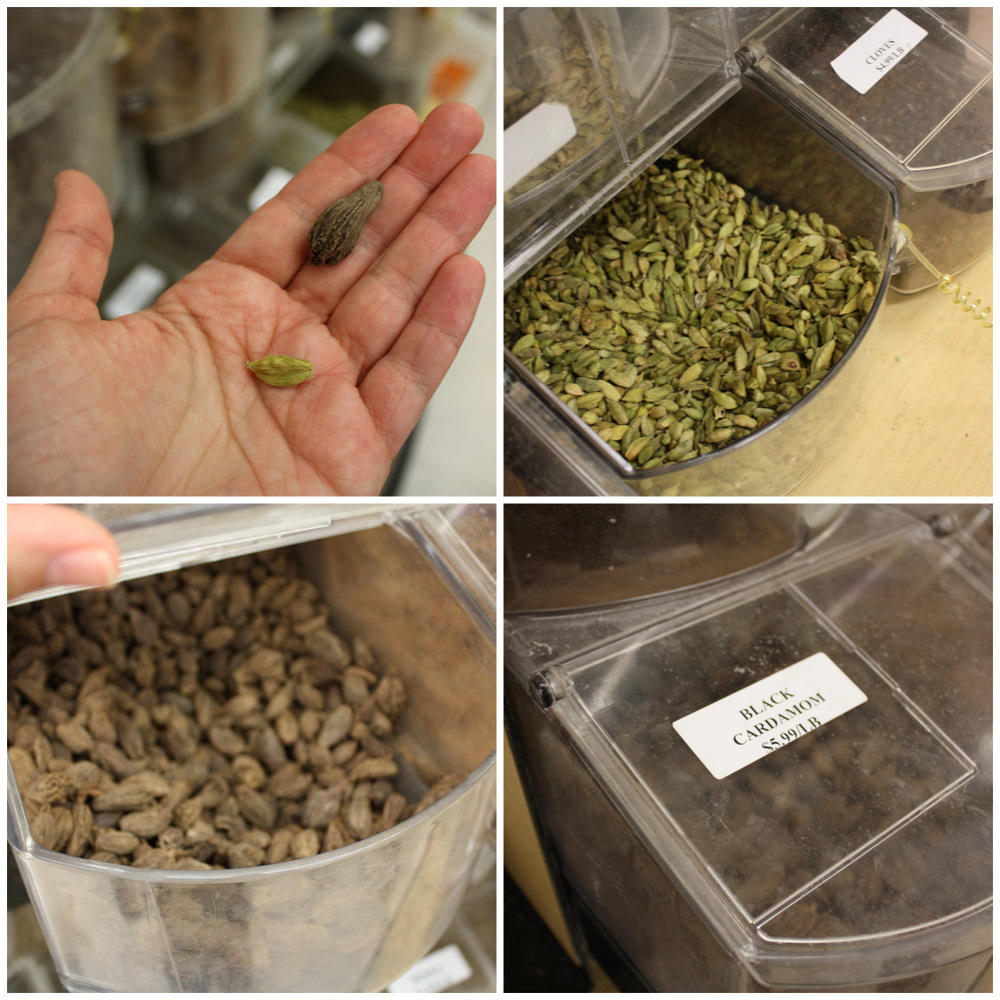
Labeled varieties of cardamom in storage containers

=== Trade ===
Cardamom production's demand and supply patterns of trade are influenced by price movements, nationally and internationally, in 5 to 6-year cycles. Importing leaders mentioned are Saudi Arabia and Kuwait, while other significant importers include Germany, Iran, Japan, Jordan, Pakistan, Qatar, United Arab Emirates, the UK, and the former USSR. According to the United Nations Conference on Trade and Development, 80 percent of cardamom's total consumption occurs in the Middle East.

In the 19th century, Bombay and Madras were among the principal distributing ports of cardamom. India's exports to foreign countries increased during the early 20th century, particularly to the United Kingdom, followed by Arabia, Aden, Germany, Turkey, Japan, Persia and Egypt. However, some 95% of cardamom produced in India is for domestic purposes, and India is itself by far the most important consuming country for cardamoms in the world. India also imports cardamom from Sri Lanka. In 1903–1904, these imports came to 122,076 kg (269,132 lb), valued at Rs. 1,98,710. In contrast, Guatemala's local consumption is negligible, which supports the exportation of most of the cardamom that is produced. In the mid-1800s, Ceylon's cardamom was chiefly imported by Canada. After saffron and vanilla, cardamom is currently the third most expensive spice, and is used as a spice and flavouring for food and liqueurs.

== History ==
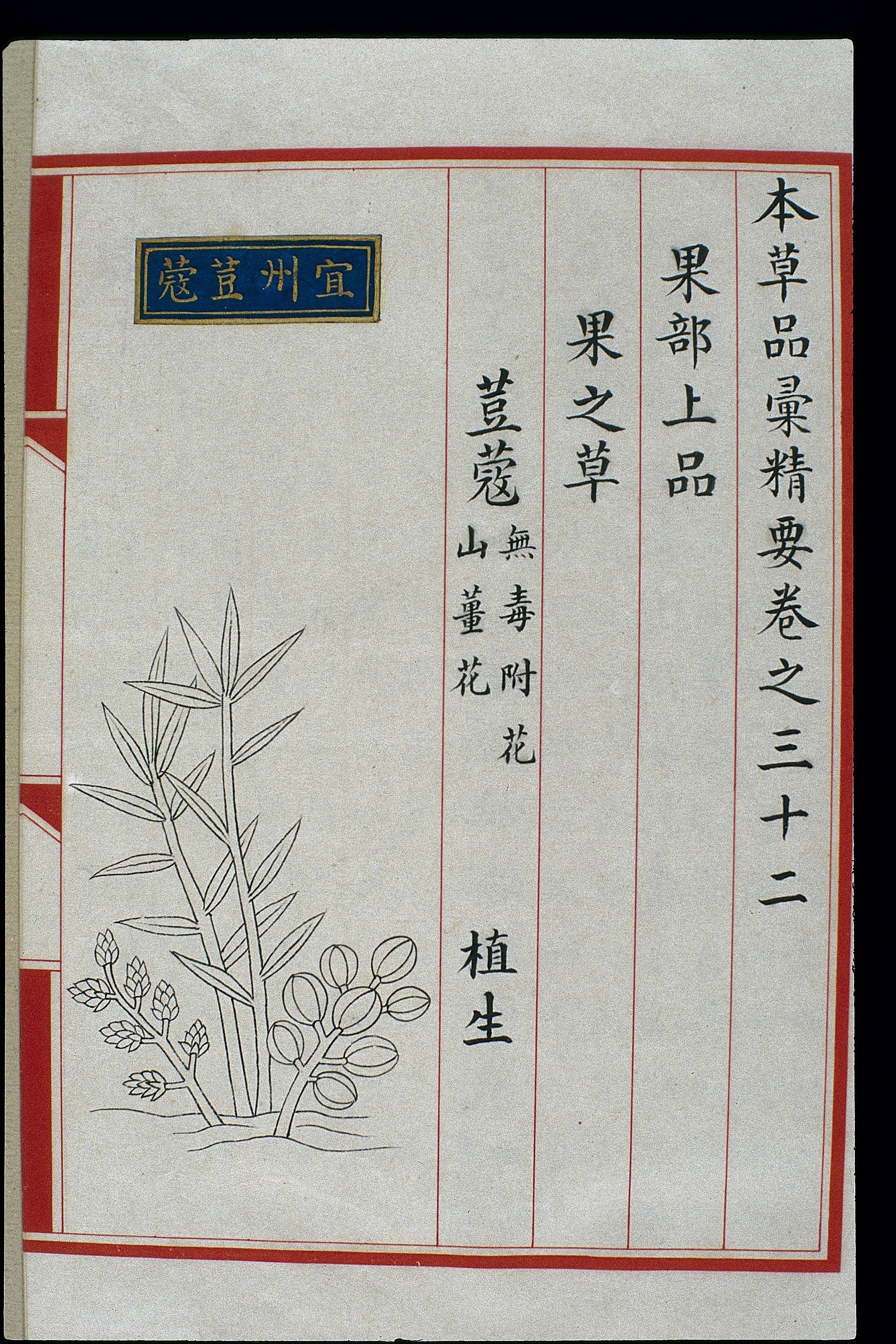
Chinese drawing and description of cardamom from the Bencao Pinhui Jingyao (1505), by imperial physician Liu Wentai

Cardamom has been used in flavorings and food over centuries. During the Middle Ages, cardamom dominated the trade industry. The Arab states played a significant role in the trade of Indian spices, including cardamom. It is now ranked the third most expensive spice following saffron and vanilla.

Cardamom production began in ancient times, and has been referred to in ancient Sanskrit texts as ela. The Babylonians and Assyrians used the spice early on, and trade in cardamom opened up along land routes and by the interlinked Persian Gulf route controlled from Dilmun as early as the third millennium BCE Early Bronze Age, into western Asia and the Mediterranean world.

The ancient Greeks thought highly of cardamom, and the Greek physicians Dioscorides and Hippocrates wrote about its therapeutic properties, identifying it as a digestive aid. Due to demand in ancient Greece and Rome, the cardamom trade developed into a handsome luxury business; cardamom was one of the spices eligible for import tax in Alexandria in 126 CE. In medieval times, Venice became the principal importer of cardamom into the west, along with pepper, cloves and cinnamon, which was traded with merchants from the Levant with salt and meat products.

In China, Amomum was an important part of the economy during the Song Dynasty (960–1279). In 1150, the Arab geographer Muhammad al-Idrisi noted that cardamom was being imported to Aden, in Yemen, from India and China.

The Portuguese became involved in the trade in the 16th century, and the industry gained wide-scale European interest in the 19th century.

== Gallery ==
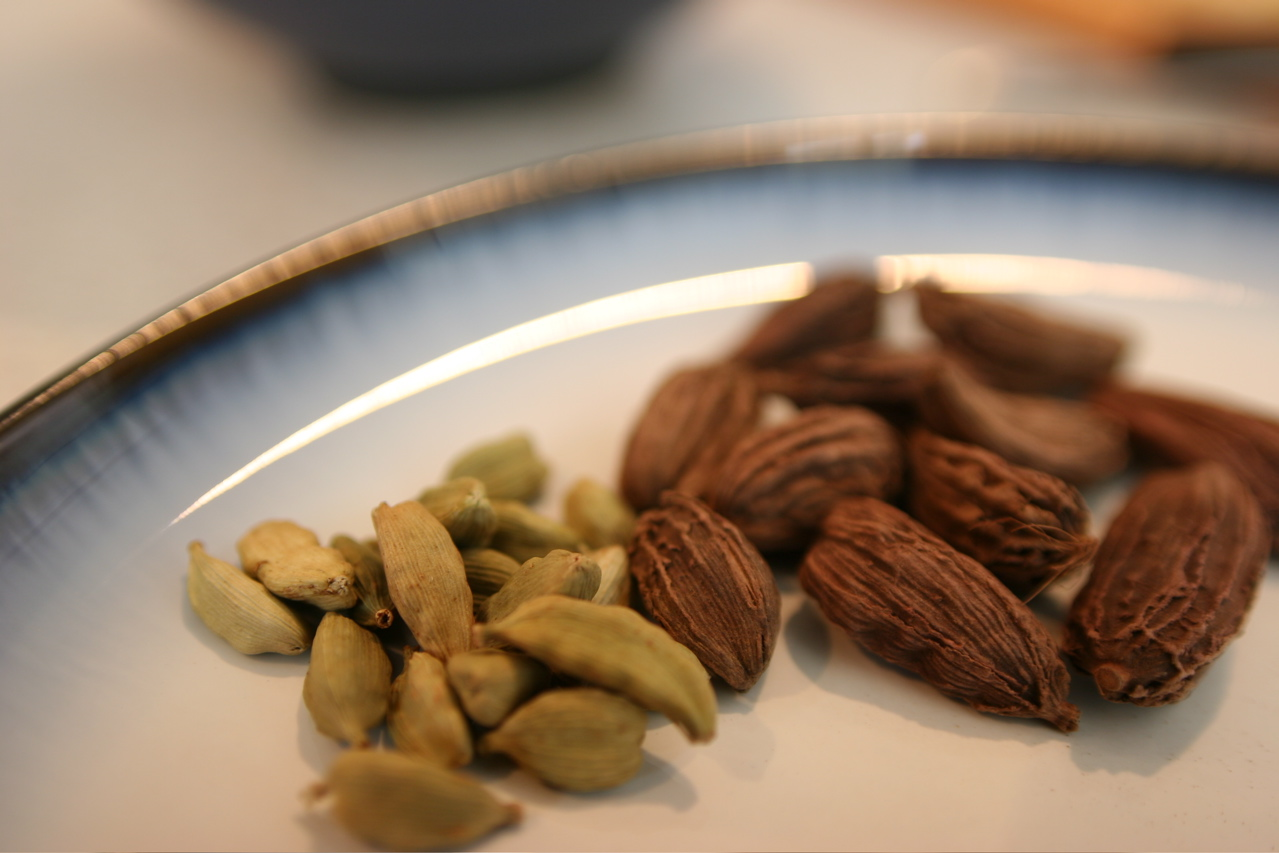
Black and green cardamom

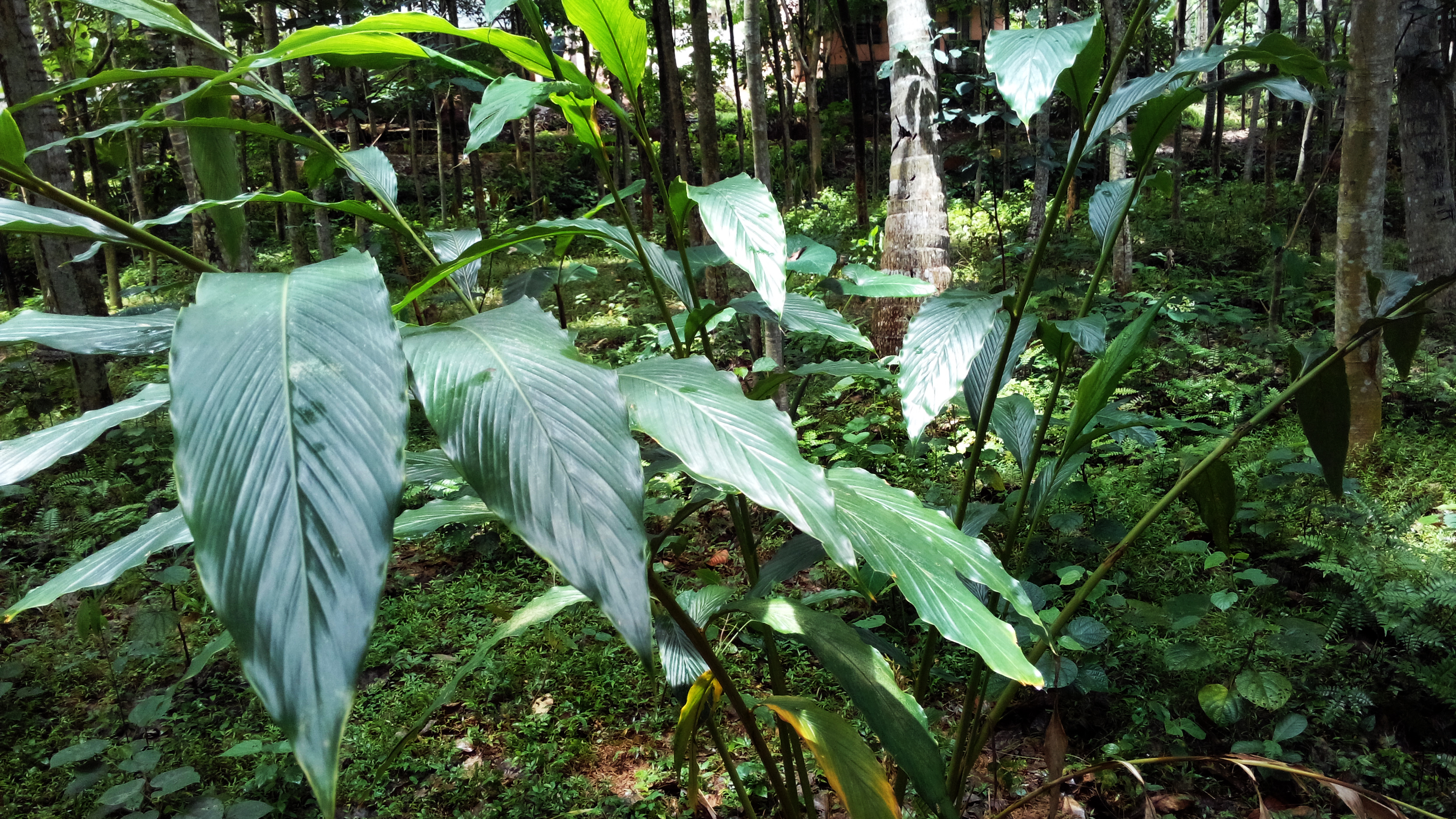
Cardamom plant (one year old)

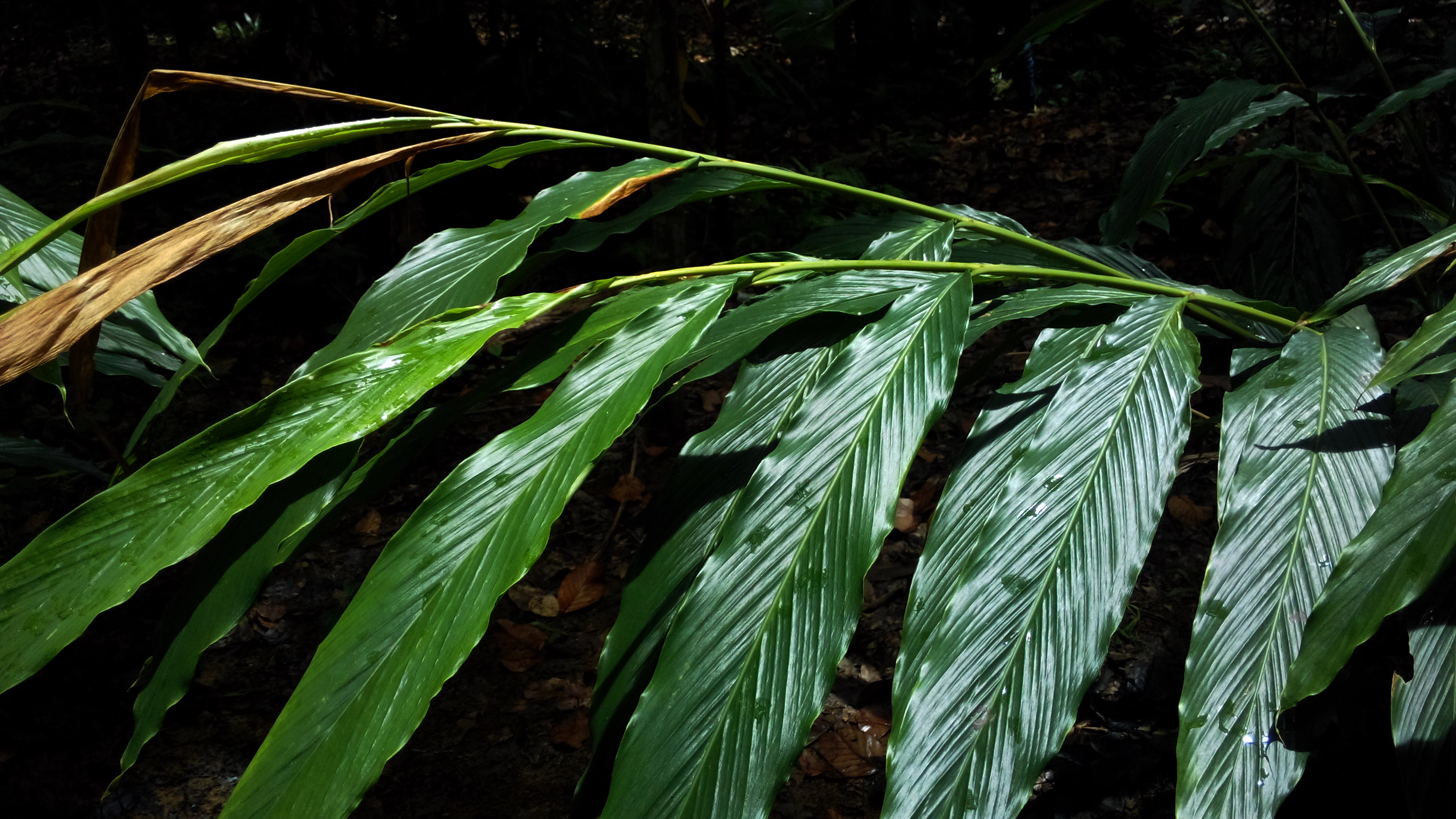
Leaves of cardamom

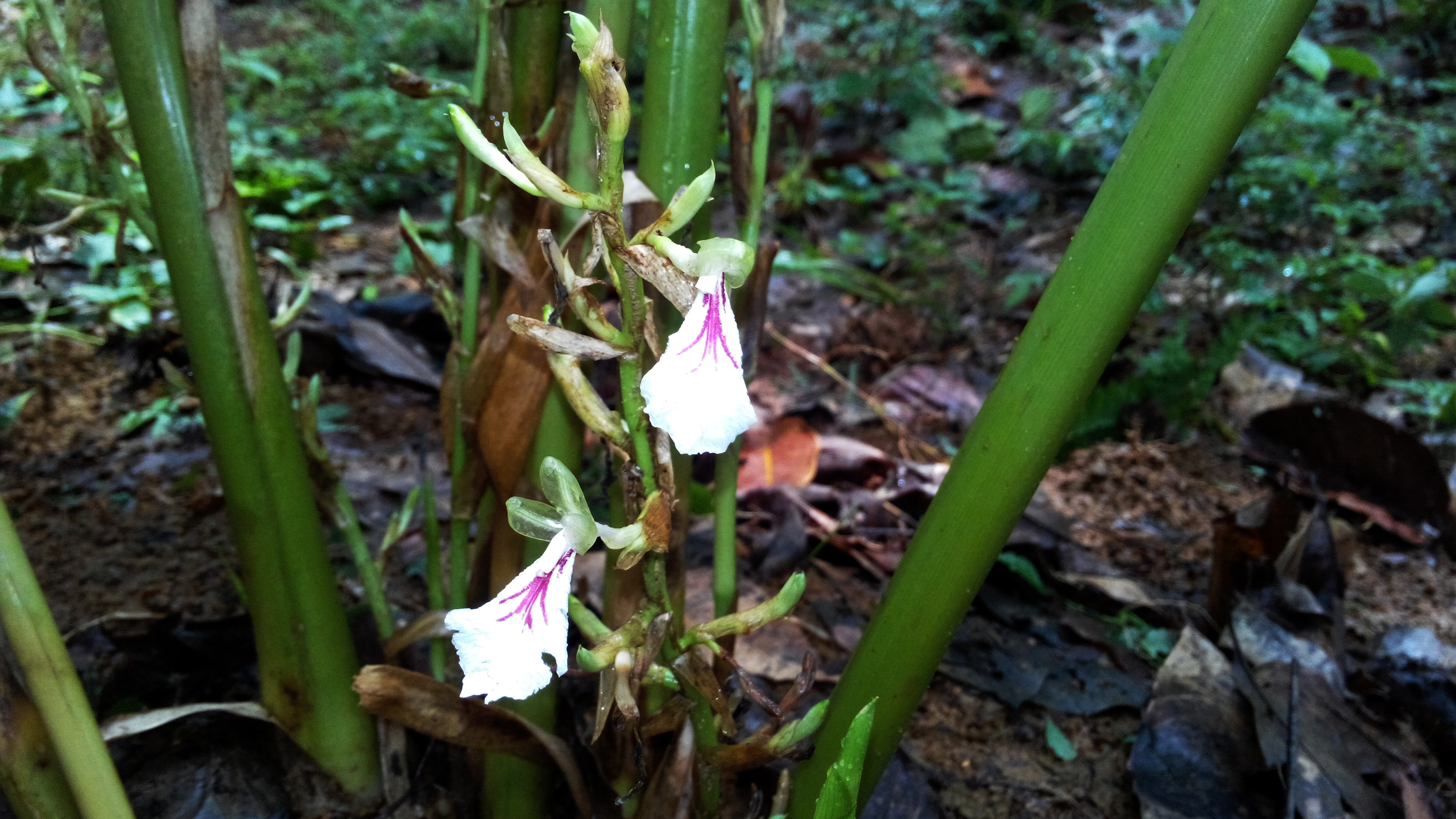
Cardamom flowering stems

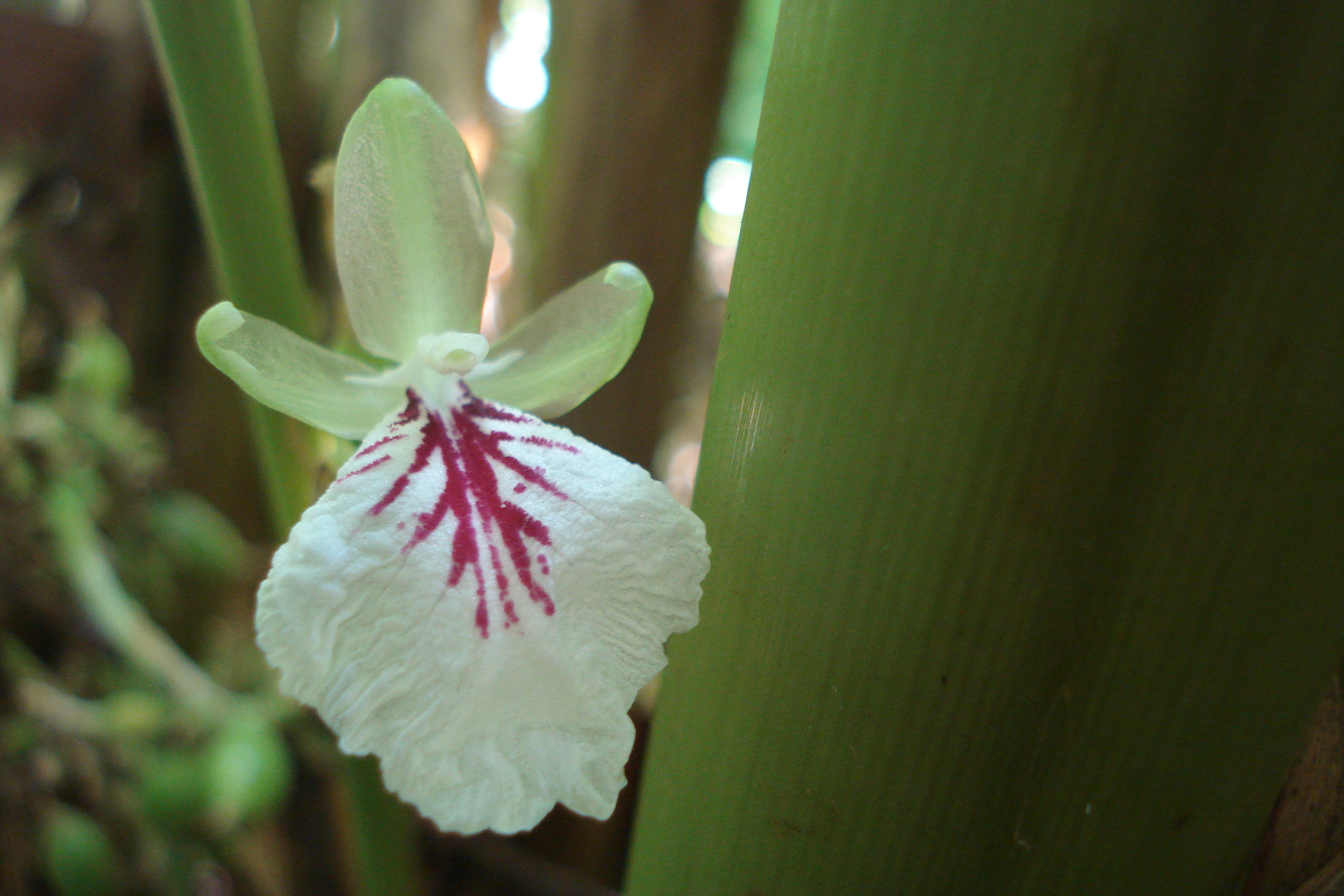
Cardamom flower

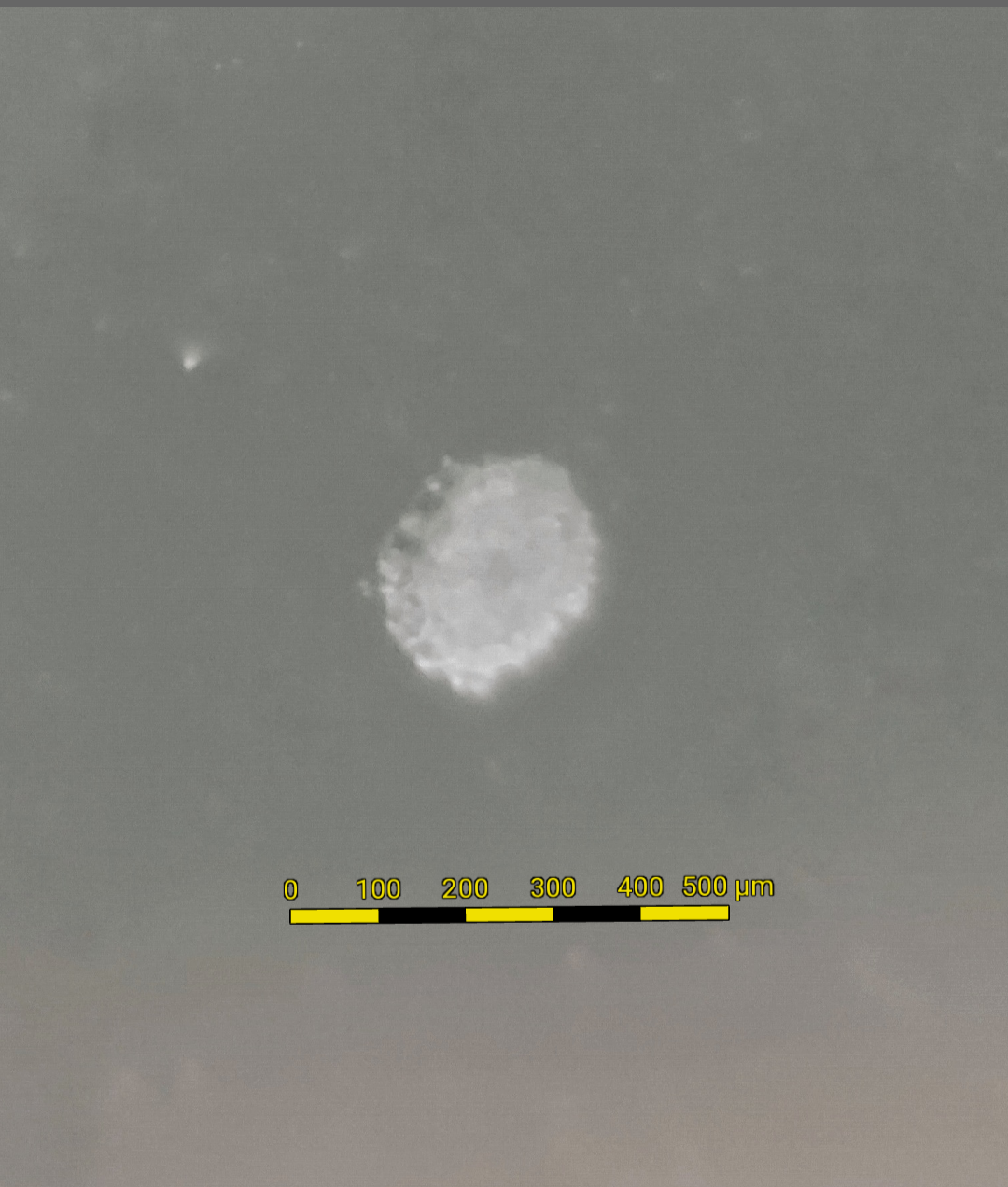
Pollen grain of Cardamom

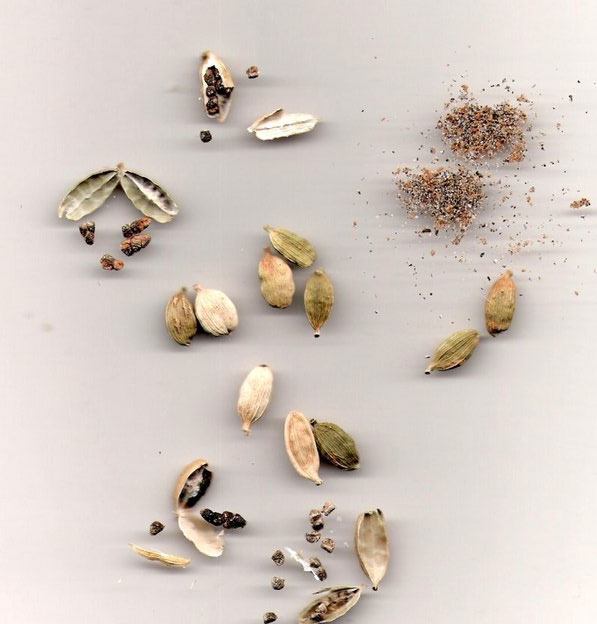
Cardamom fruit and seeds

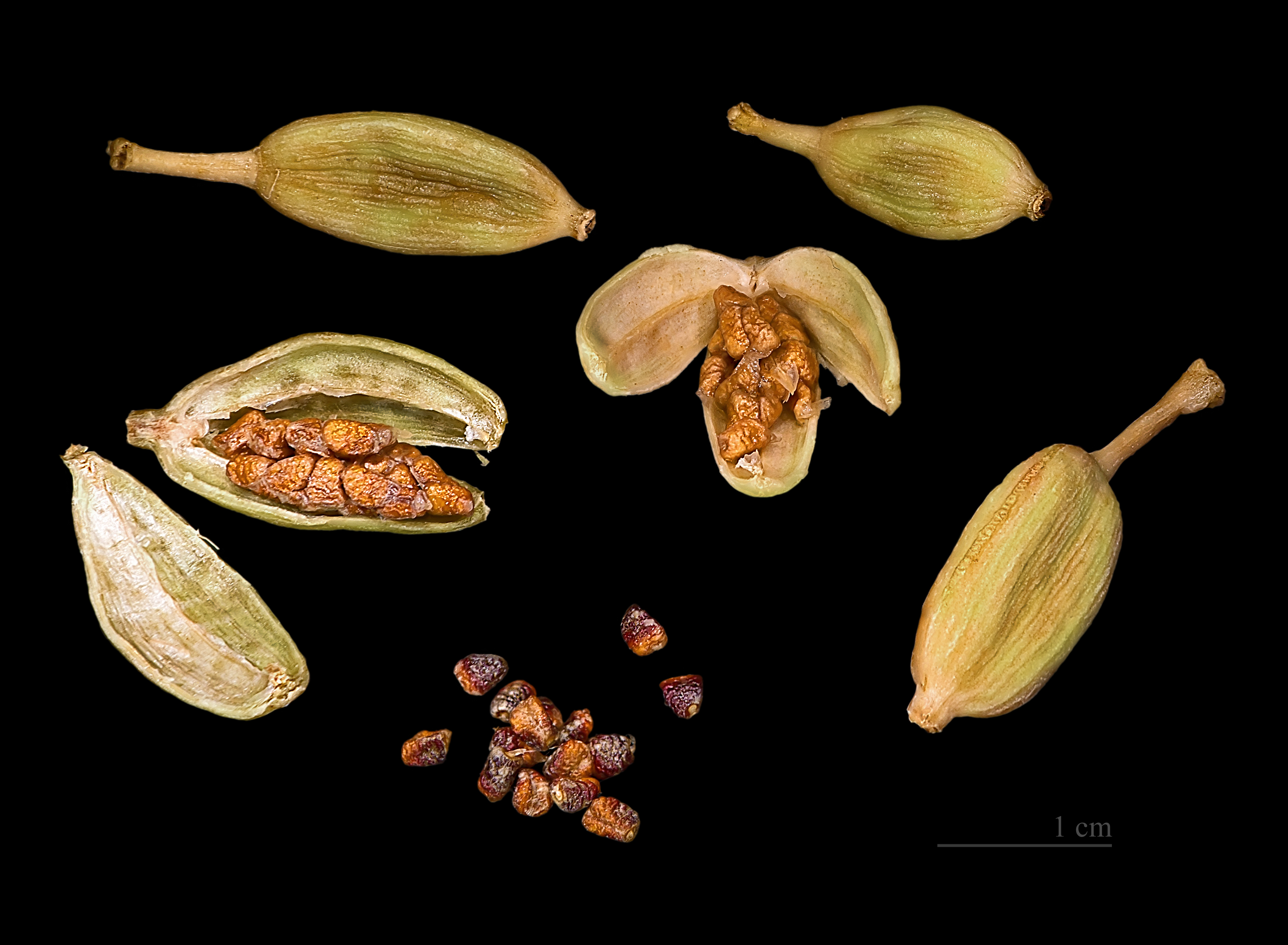
Green cardamom pods and seeds

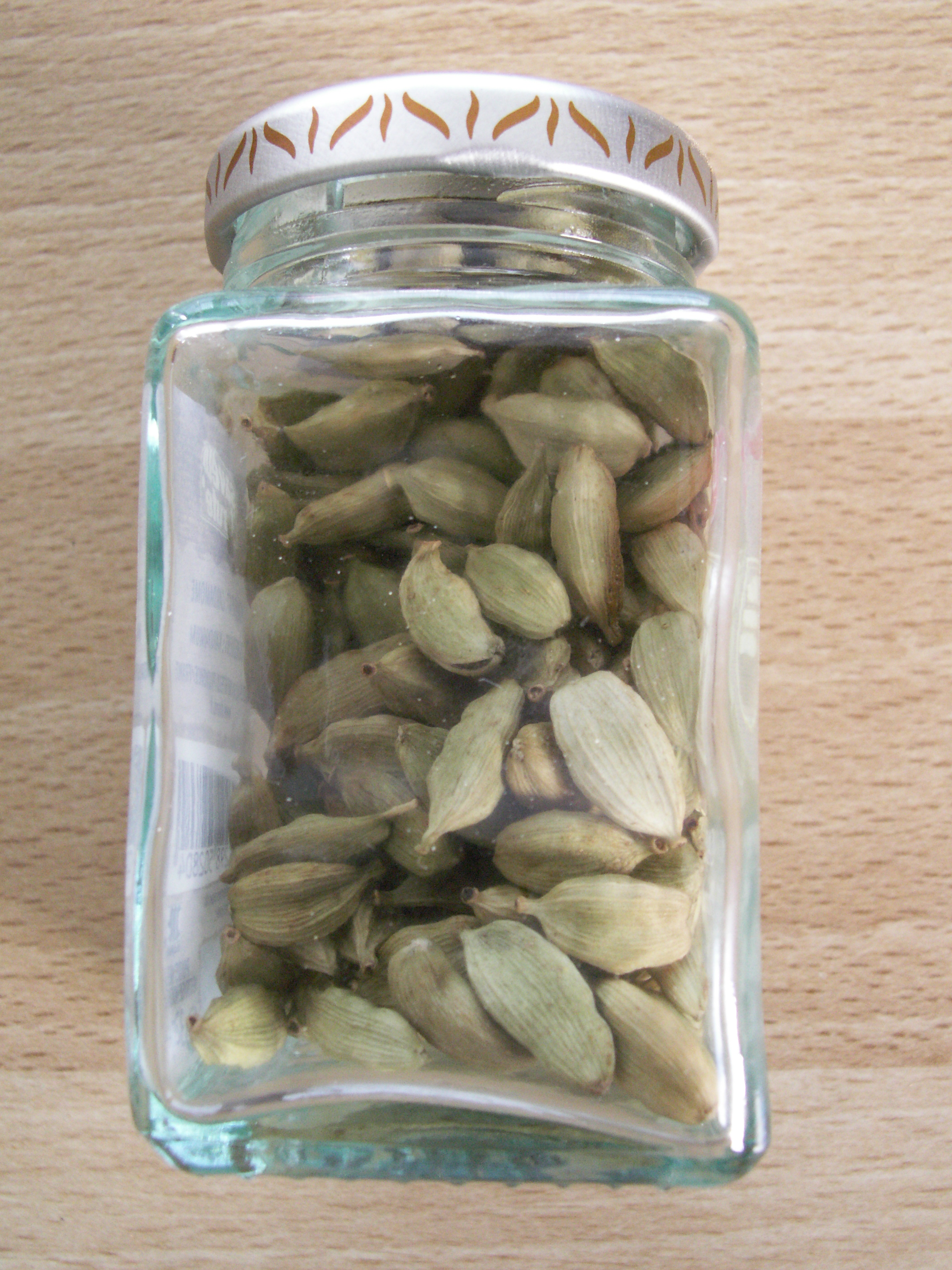
Jar of green cardamom

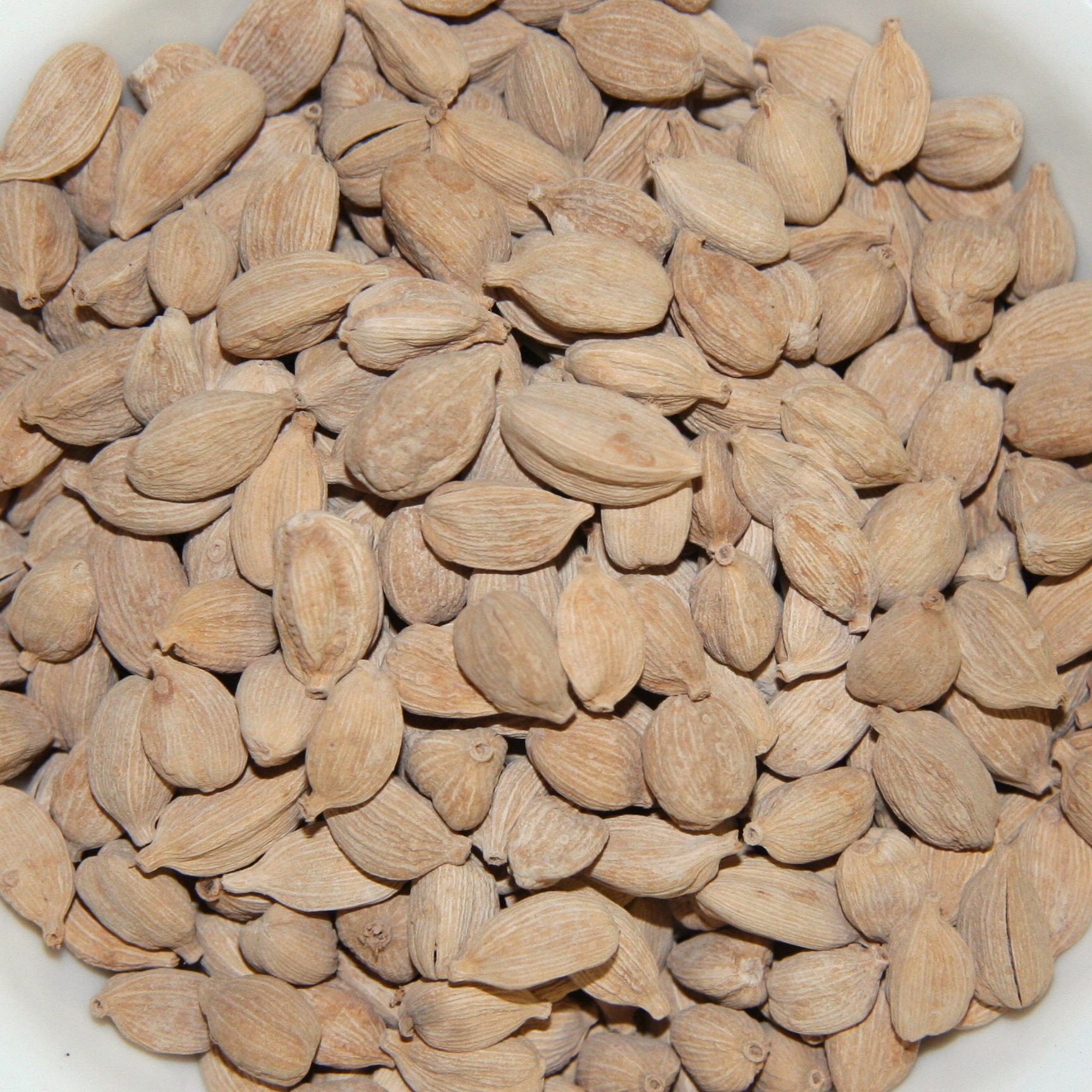
White cardamom pods in a bowl

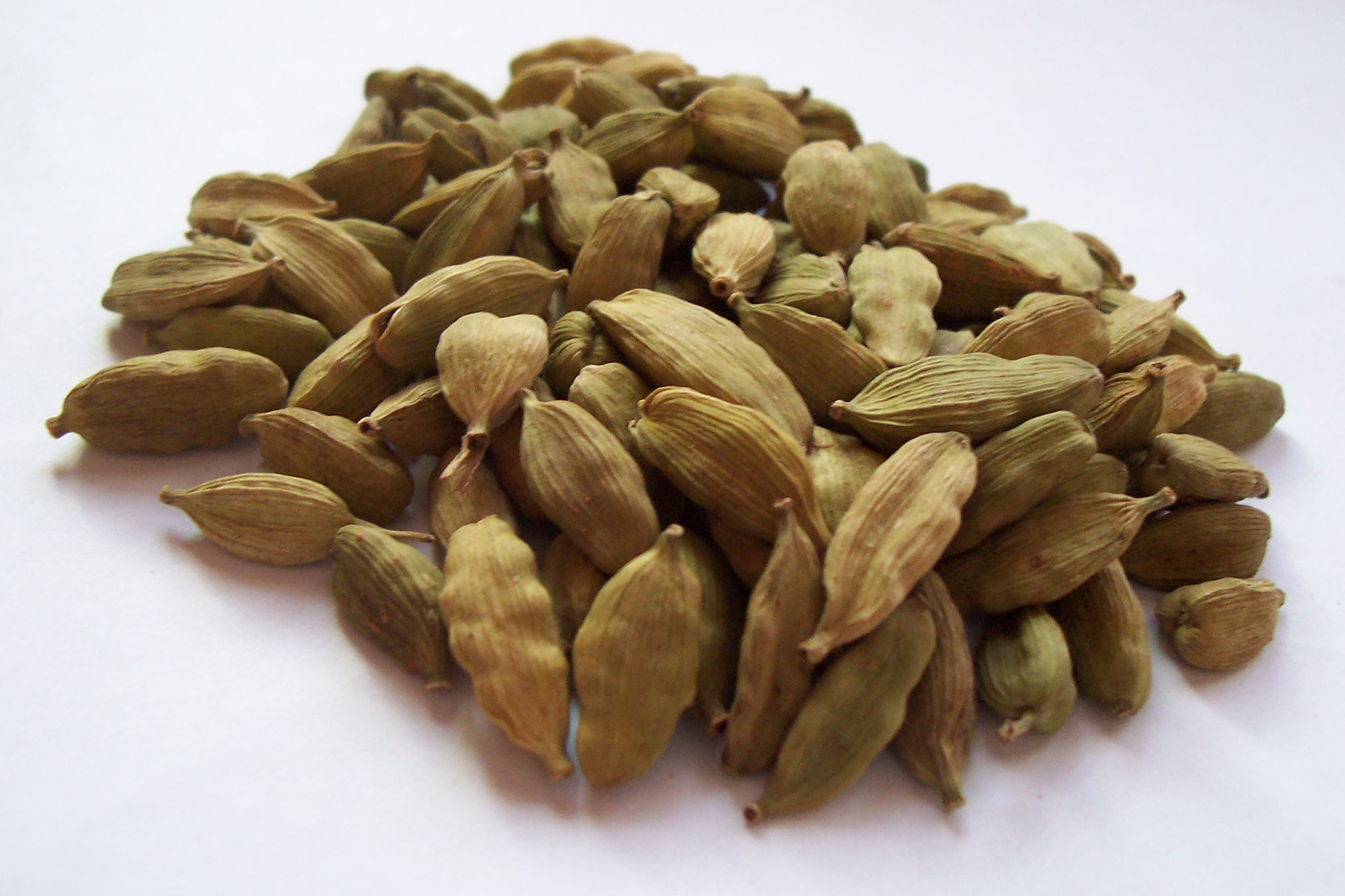
Cardamom pods as used as a spice in India

== Bibliography ==
- Bell, Jacob (1843). Pharmaceutical Journal: A Weekly Record of Pharmacy and Allied Sciences. Vol. II, No. 1 (Public domain ed.). London: John Churchill.
- Cumo, Christopher Martin (25 April 2013). Encyclopedia of Cultivated Plants: From Acacia to Zinnia [3 Volumes]. ABC-CLIO. ISBN 978-1-59884-775-8.
- Kusters, Koen; Belcher, Brian (2004). Forest Products, Livelihoods and Conservation. Center for International Forestry Research. ISBN 978-979-3361-23-9.
- Nair, K. P. Prabhakaran (2011). Agronomy and Economy of Black Pepper and Cardamom: The "King" and "Queen" of Spices. Elsevier. ISBN 978-0-12-391865-9.
- Owen, T. C. (1883). Notes on Cardamom Cultivation (Public domain ed.). A. M. & J. Ferguson.
- Parthasarathy, V. A.; Chempakam, Bhageerathy; Zachariah, T. John (2008). Chemistry of Spices. CABI. ISBN 978-1-84593-420-0.
- Watt, Sir George (1908). The Commercial Products of India: Being an Abridgement of "The Dictionary of the Economic Products of India." (Public domain ed.). J. Murray. p. 514.
- CardamomHQ: In-depth information on Cardamom
- Mabberley, D.J. The Plant-book: A Portable Dictionary of the Higher Plants. Cambridge University Press, 1996, ISBN 0-521-34060-8
- Gernot Katzer's Spice Pages: Cardamom
- Plant Cultures: botany and history of Cardamom
- Pham Hoang Ho 1993, Cay Co Vietnam [Plants of Vietnam: in Vietnamese], vols. I, II & III, Montreal.
- Buckingham, J.S. & Petheram, R.J. 2004, Cardamom cultivation and forest biodiversity in northwest Vietnam, Agricultural Research and Extension Network, Overseas Development Institute, London UK.
- Aubertine, C. 2004, Cardamom (Amomum spp.) in Lao PDR: the hazardous future of an agroforest system product, in 'Forest products, livelihoods and conservation: case studies of non-timber forest products systems vol. 1-Asia, Center for International Forestry Research. Bogor, Indonesia.
