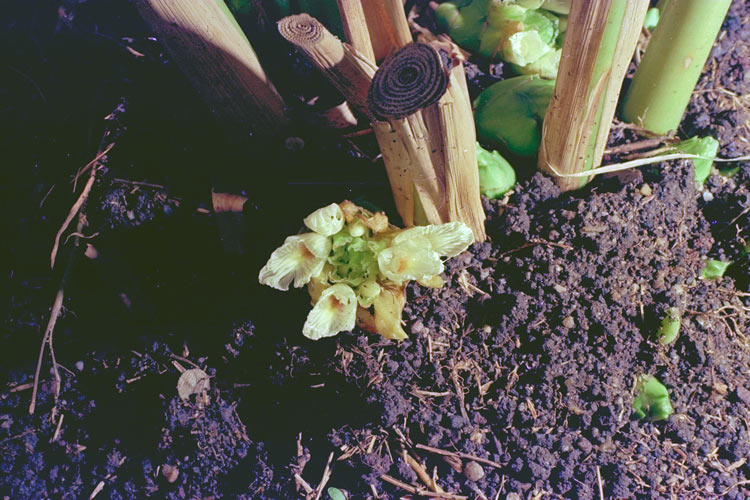
- Flowers

Conservation status
- Critically Endangered (NCA)

Scientific classification
- Kingdom: Plantae
- Clade: Tracheophytes
- Clade: Angiosperms
- Clade: Monocots
- Clade: Commelinids
- Order: Zingiberales
- Family: Zingiberaceae
- Genus: Amomum
- Species: A. queenslandicum

Binomial name
- Amomum queenslandicum R.M.Sm.

= Amomum queenslandicum =

Cape York ginger

Species of flowering plant

Amomum queenslandicum, commonly known as Cape York ginger, is a plant in the ginger family Zingiberaceae found in New Guinea and a small part of Cape York Peninsula, Queensland, Australia.

== Description ==
Amomum queenslandicum is a rhizomatous herb up to 3 m tall. The true stem of the plant—the rhizome—remains underground and only the leaves, flowers and fruit appear above ground. The leaves are glabrous, lanceolate and about 60 cm long by 12 cm wide. The inflorescence is a compact cluster about 5 cm long and 3 cm wide produced at ground level. The fruit is a capsule about 4 cm long by 3 cm wide with nine wings.

== Taxonomy ==
The Cape York ginger was first described by the Scottish botanist and ginger specialist Rosemary Margaret Smith, who published it in the journal Notes from the Royal Botanic Garden, Edinburgh in 1980.

== Distribution and habitat ==
Amomum queenslandicum favours disturbed areas of lowland and gallery rainforest in Cape York Peninsula and New Guinea, at altitudes from sea level up to 200 m.

== Conservation ==
Populations of this species are declining, and it is listed as critically endangered under the Queensland Government's Nature Conservation Act. The cause of the decline is likely to be foraging activities of feral pigs. As of 20 June 2024, it has not been assessed by the International Union for Conservation of Nature (IUCN).

== Gallery ==
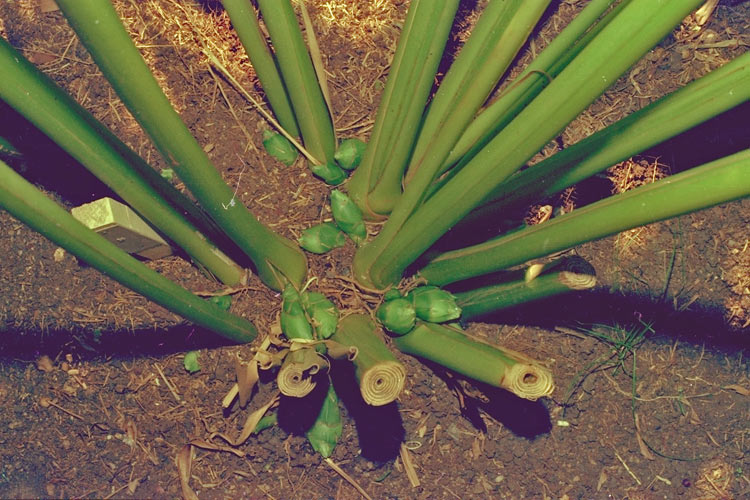
Flower buds

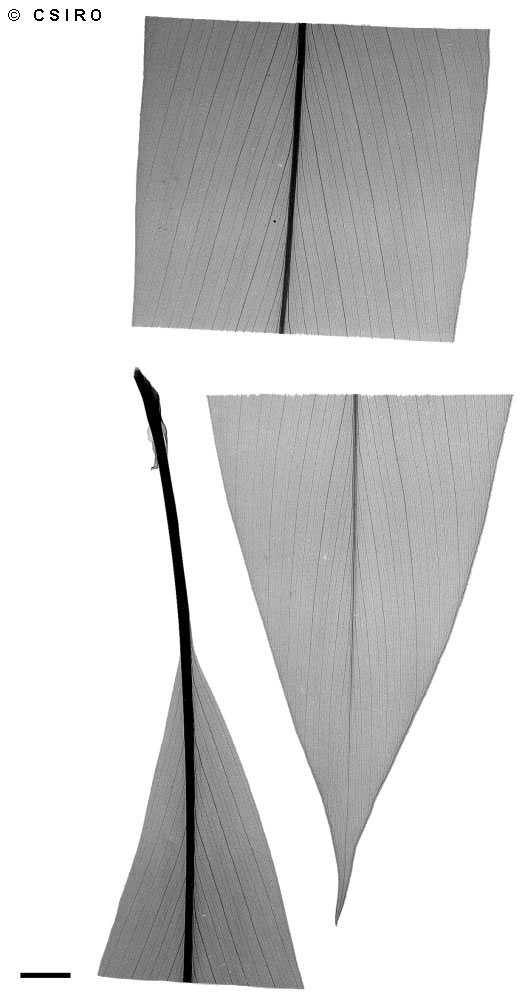
X-ray of leaf
