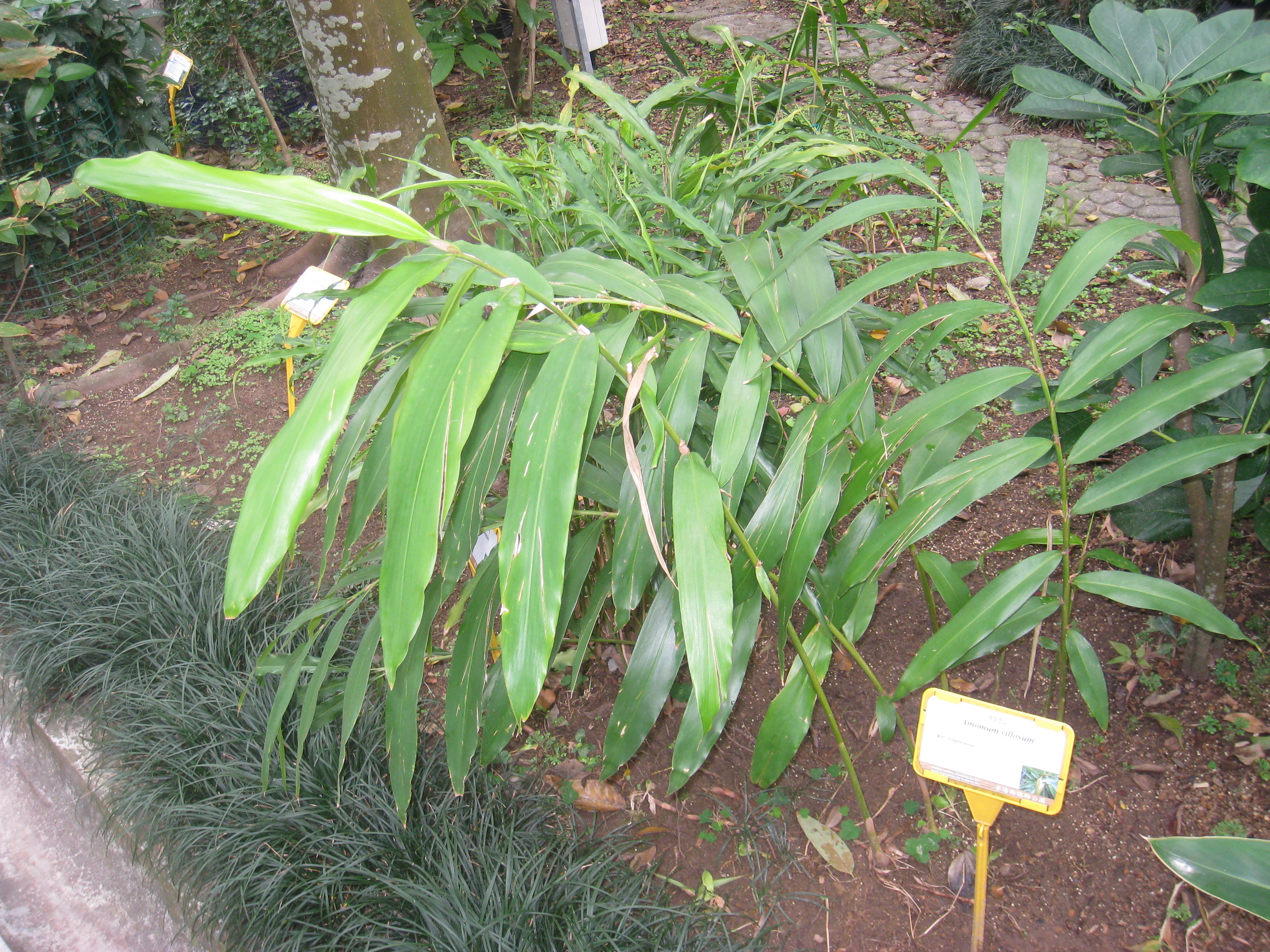
- W. villosa

Scientific classification
- Kingdom: Plantae
- Clade: Tracheophytes
- Clade: Angiosperms
- Clade: Monocots
- Clade: Commelinids
- Order: Zingiberales
- Family: Zingiberaceae
- Subfamily: Alpinioideae
- Tribe: Alpinieae
- Genus: Wurfbainia; Giseke

Synonyms
- Paludana Giseke

= Wurfbainia =

Genus of flowering plants

Wurfbainia is an Asian genus of flowering plants in the family Zingiberaceae. Species in this genus have been recorded from the Himalayas to South China, mainland Southeast Asia, and Western and Central Malesia. It has previously been placed as a synonym of Amomum.

The genus was named in honor of Johann Siegmund Wurffbain (last name also spelled Wurfbain; 1613-1661), a 17th-century German physician, merchant, and travel writer from Nuremberg who served with the Dutch East India Company and traveled extensively across Southeast Asia and the East Indies between 1632 and 1646. His travelogues provided early European documentation of the geography, natural history, flora, and trade goods (including cardamoms and other ginger-family spices) of the East Indies. The name was established by the German botanist Paul Dietrich Giseke in his 1792 work Praelectiones in Ordines Naturales Plantarum. Giseke coined the genus to house Asian cardamom species. For over two centuries, Wurfbainia was treated as a synonym of the broader genus Amomum. Molecular phylogenetic studies eventually revealed that Amomum was polyphyletic, and, in 2018, the botanists Jana Škorničková and Axel Dalberg Poulsen resurrected Wurfbainia as a distinct, valid genus to accommodate a large clade of Asian ginger species (including W. villosa and W. vera).

== Species ==
Plants of the World Online currently includes:

- Wurfbainia aromatica (Roxb.) Skornick. & A.D.Poulsen
- Wurfbainia bicorniculata (K.Schum.) Skornick. & A.D.Poulsen
- Wurfbainia biflora (Jack) Skornick. & A.D.Poulsen
- Wurfbainia blumeana (Valeton) Skornick. & A.D.Poulsen
- Wurfbainia compacta (Sol. ex Maton) Skornick. & A.D.Poulsen
- Wurfbainia elegans (Ridl.) Skornick. & A.D.Poulsen
- Wurfbainia ellipticarpa Kaewsri
- Wurfbainia geostachyoides Kaewsri
- Wurfbainia glabrifolia (Lamxay & M.F.Newman) Skornick. & A.D.Poulsen
- Wurfbainia globosa Kaewsri
- Wurfbainia gracilis (Blume) Skornick. & A.D.Poulsen
- Wurfbainia graminea (Wall. ex Baker) Skornick. & A.D.Poulsen
- Wurfbainia hedyosma (I.M.Turner) Skornick. & A.D.Poulsen
- Wurfbainia jainii (S.Tripathi & V.Prakash) Skornick. & A.D.Poulsen
- Wurfbainia longiflora Kaewsri
- Wurfbainia longiligularis (T.L.Wu) Skornick. & A.D.Poulsen
- Wurfbainia micrantha (Ridl.) Skornick. & A.D.Poulsen
- Wurfbainia microcarpa (C.F.Liang & D.Fang) Skornick. & A.D.Poulsen
- Wurfbainia mindanaensis (Elmer) Skornick. & A.D.Poulsen
- Wurfbainia mollis (Ridl.) Skornick. & A.D.Poulsen
- Wurfbainia neoaurantiaca (T.L.Wu, K.Larsen & Turland) Skornick. & A.D.Poulsen
- Wurfbainia palawanensis (Elmer) Skornick. & A.D.Poulsen
- Wurfbainia parviflora Kaewsri
- Wurfbainia quadratolaminaris (S.Q.Tong) Skornick. & A.D.Poulsen
- Wurfbainia schmidtii (K.Schum.) Skornick. & A.D.Poulsen
- Wurfbainia staminidiva (Gobilik, A.L.Lamb & A.D.Poulsen) Skornick. & A.D.Poulsen
- Wurfbainia tenella (Lamxay & M.F.Newman) Skornick. & A.D.Poulsen
- Wurfbainia testacea (Ridl.) Skornick. & A.D.Poulsen
- Wurfbainia uliginosa (J.Koenig) Giseke - type species
- Wurfbainia vera (Blackw.) Skornick. & A.D.Poulsen
- Wurfbainia villosa (Lour.) Skornick. & A.D.Poulsen
- Wurfbainia yingyongii Kaewsri
