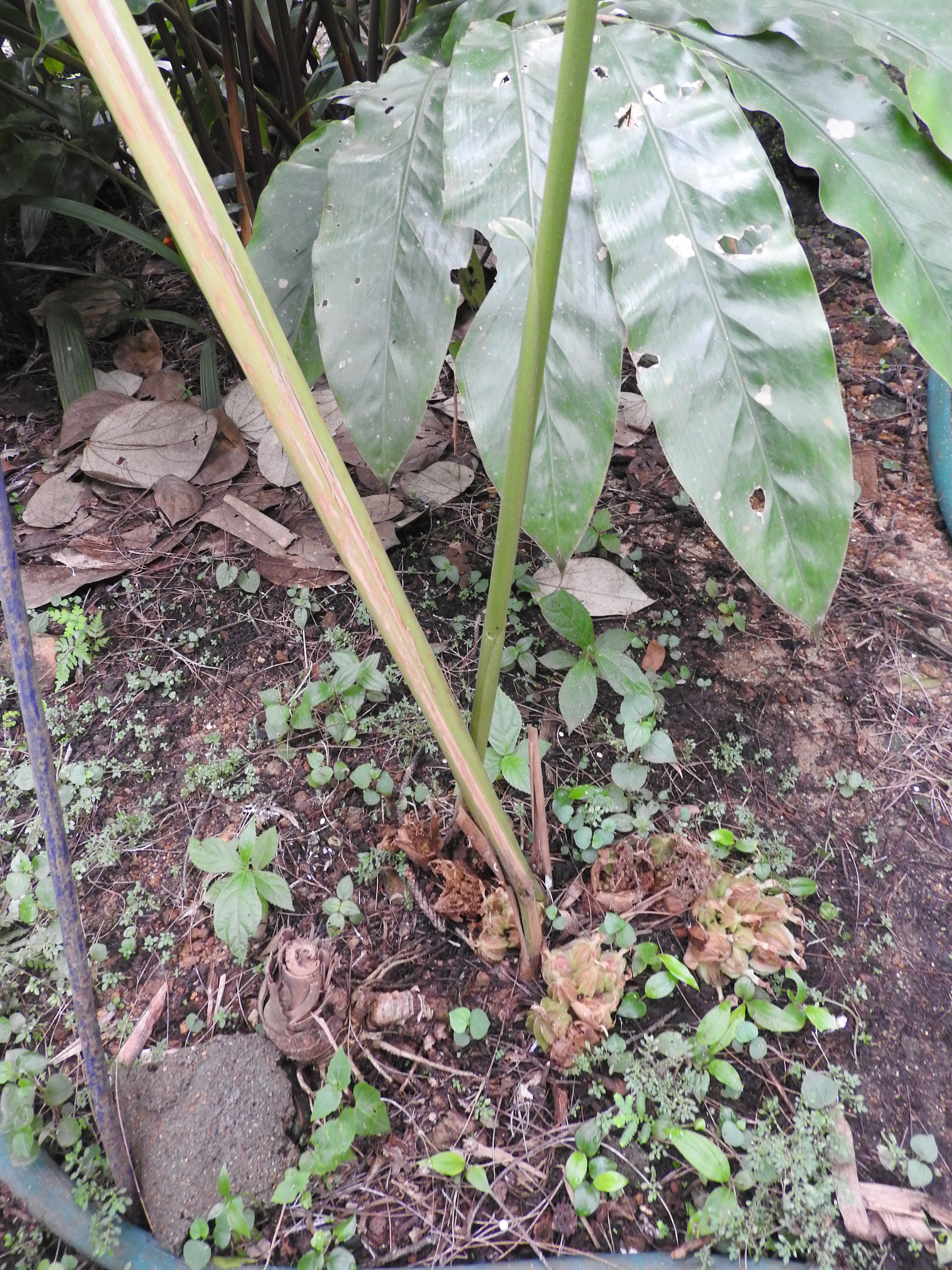

Scientific classification
- Kingdom: Plantae
- Clade: Tracheophytes
- Clade: Angiosperms
- Clade: Monocots
- Clade: Commelinids
- Order: Zingiberales
- Family: Zingiberaceae
- Genus: Amomum
- Species: A. maximum

Binomial name
- Amomum maximum Roxb.

= Amomum maximum =

Species of flowering plant

Amomum maximum, commonly known as Java cardamom, is a perennial, rhizomatous herb native to a vast region spanning Tropical and Subtropical Asia. It thrives in wet, tropical biomes, typically found in the shady undergrowth of forests and on hill slopes at elevations of 600 to 800 meters. The plant is characterized by its large, oblong-lanceshaped leaves, which can grow up to 70 cm long, and its ellipsoid, purple-green fruits that have nine distinct, winged ribs. Its striking flowers are borne in nearly spherical spikes, featuring a white lip with a prominent yellow central line and radiating red veins. Known locally as Perelam (Amomum pterocarpum) in Kerala, India, this species is documented as doubtfully present in Sumatra but is native to a wide range of locations including India, China, Vietnam, Myanmar, and New Guinea. The plant's life cycle is marked by a flowering and fruiting season that typically occurs from May to October.
