= Amomum exertum =

Scientific classification
- Kingdom: Plantae
- Clade: Tracheophytes
- Clade: Angiosperms
- Clade: Monocots
- Clade: Commelinids
- Order: Zingiberales
- Family: Zingiberaceae
- Genus: Amomum
- Species: A. exertum

Binomial name
- Amomum exertum (Scort.) Skornick. & Hlavatá

Synonyms
- Elettariopsis exserta (Scort.) Baker

Species of flowering plant

Amomum exertum is a species in the ginger family, Zingiberaceae. It was first described by Benedetto Scortechini and renamed by Skornick. & Hlavatá.
