= Wurfbainia elegans =

Scientific classification
- Kingdom: Plantae
- Clade: Embryophytes
- Clade: Tracheophytes
- Clade: Angiosperms
- Clade: Monocots
- Clade: Commelinids
- Order: Zingiberales
- Family: Zingiberaceae
- Genus: Wurfbainia
- Species: W. elegans

Binomial name
- Wurfbainia elegans (Ridl.) Škorničk. & A.D.Poulsen

Synonyms
- Amomum elegans Ridl.

Species of flowering plant

Wurfbainia elegans is a species of plant belonging to Zingiberaceae, the ginger family. It is endemic to the Philippines.

== Habitat and ecology ==
The species is abundant in the secondary forest of Camp 7 Experimental Forest Station, Minglanilla, Cebu. The forest, with a relatively dry season from November to April, and wet season the rest of the year, is dominated by the plant species Sarcandra glabra, Artocarpus odoratissimus and Donax canniformis.

== History ==
The Singapore-based English botanist Henry Nicholas Ridley first described the species under the name Amomum elegans in 1906. The genus and species were revised in 2018 by the botanists Jana Škorničkova (born 1975) and Axel Dalberg Poulsen (born 1961, Danmark), in the journal Taxon.
