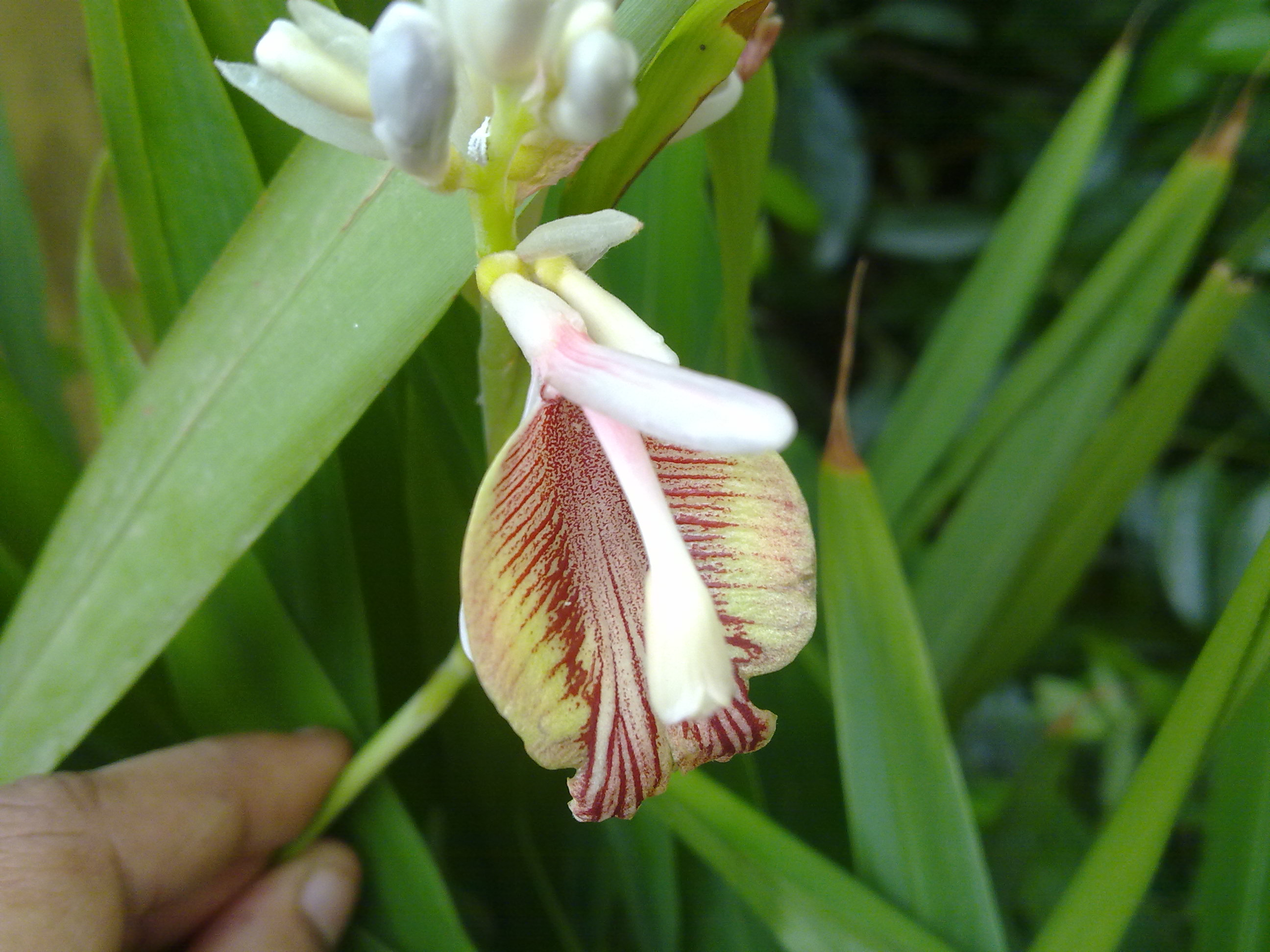
- Amomum subulatum (black cardamom)

Scientific classification
- Kingdom: Plantae
- Clade: Tracheophytes
- Clade: Angiosperms
- Clade: Monocots
- Clade: Commelinids
- Order: Zingiberales
- Family: Zingiberaceae
- Subfamily: Alpinioideae
- Tribe: Alpinieae
- Genus: Amomum; Roxb.

Species
- See list of Amomum species

Synonyms
- Acinax Raf.; Cardamomum Rumph. ex Kuntze; Elettariopsis Baker; Geocallis Horan.; Paramomum S.Q.Tong; Torymenes Salisb.

= Amomum =

Genus of flowering plants

Amomum is a genus of plants containing about 111 species native to China, the Indian subcontinent, Southeast Asia, New Guinea, and Queensland. It includes several species of cardamom. Plants of this genus are remarkable for their pungency and aromatic properties.

Among ancient writers, the name amomum was ascribed to various odoriferous plants that cannot be positively identified today. The word derives from Latin amomum, which is the latinisation of the Greek ἄμωμον (amomon), a kind of an Indian spice plant. Edmund Roberts noted on his 1834 trip to China that amomum was used as a spice to "season sweet dishes" in culinary practice.

== Selected species ==
See list of Amomum species for a complete list.

The following have further information:

- Amomum exertum
- Amomum smithiae
- Amomum subulatum (black cardamom) - type species

=== Formerly placed here ===
- Amomum compactum – now Wurfbainia compacta
- Amomum costatum – now Hornstedtia costata
- Amomum dallachyi – now Meistera dallachyi
- Amomum elegans – now Wurfbainia elegans
- Amomum ensal – now Elettaria cardamomum
- Amomum epiphyticum – now Epiamomum epiphyticum
- Amomum filiforme – now Hedychium coronarium
- Amomum melegueta – now Aframomum melegueta
- Amomum mioga – now Zingiber mioga
- Amomum ovoideum – now Wurfbainia uliginosa
- Amomum pulchellum – now Cyphostigma pulchellum
- Amomum repens – now Renealmia alpinia
- Amomum robustum – now Wurfbainia uliginosa
- Amomum tsao-ko – now Lanxangia tsaoko
- Amomum uliginosum – now Wurfbainia uliginosa
- Amomum uncinatum – now Elettaria cardamomum
- Amomum villosum – now Wurfbainia villosa
- Amomum zambesiacum – now Aframomum zambesiacum
