= Wurfbainia vera =

Conservation status
- Data Deficient (IUCN 3.1)

Scientific classification
- Kingdom: Plantae
- Clade: Embryophytes
- Clade: Tracheophytes
- Clade: Angiosperms
- Clade: Monocots
- Clade: Commelinids
- Order: Zingiberales
- Family: Zingiberaceae
- Genus: Wurfbainia
- Species: W. vera

Binomial name
- Wurfbainia vera (Blackw.) Škorničk. & A.D.Poulsen

Synonyms
- Amomum krervanh Pierre ex Gagnep.; Amomum verum Blackw.

Species of plant

Wurfbainia vera is a herbaceous plant in the Zingiberaceae family. Formerly called Amomum verum, it was the first plant species to be named by a woman, the Scots artist Elizabeth Blackwell in 1757. The Kingdom of Siam (Note: Depending on the year, Kingdom of Siam could have been Ayutthaya Kingdom (1351–1767), Thonburi Kingdom (1768–1782) or Rattanakosin Kingdom (1782–1932).) obtained the fruit (seeds) of the plant from Cambodia in the 18th century to export as a spice to China and Europe. The species occurs not only in Cambodia, but also in Sumatra, Thailand and Vietnam. The young leaf, the fruit and the seeds are edible, the seeds are known as Siam cardamom in English.

== Taxonomy ==
The taxon has previously been known as Amomum verum, named in 1757 by Elizabeth Blackwell (1707–1758), a Scottish artist and business operator. This is the first plant species to be named by a woman. Blackwell is more well known now as a botanical illustrator; however, her book Herbarium Blackwellianum contained a valid naming of this taxon.

The current species was described by the Czech botanist Jana Škorničková (born 1975) and the Danish botanist Axel Dalberg Poulsen (born 1961) in 2018 in the journal Taxon.

One of the botanists who described this species, Jana Škorničková, along with her colleagues with IUCN, describes this taxon as part of a species complex, which encompasses specimens from Thailand and Indonesia known as Wurfbainia testacea and Wurfbainia compacta. The taxon may thus require resolution into a number of more restricted species.

== Description ==
The species grows as a herbaceous plant/herb, some 2–3 metres (6.6–9.8 ft) high. As with other Zingiberaceae the plant consists of underground rhizomes, a pseudostem made of encircled leaf-sheaths and fruit.

== Distribution ==
The species is native to an area from Sumatra to Southeast Asia. Countries and regions where the taxa occurs are: Indonesia (Sumatra), Thailand, Cambodia, and Vietnam. It is common in Thailand and Cambodia, especially in the Cardamom Mountains.

== Habitat and ecology ==
The plant grows in lowland evergreen and semi-deciduous forest. It grows in dense forests of Cambodia and Thailand.

== Conservation ==
The taxa is classified as Data Deficient by the IUCN; see above right. It is common over a very wide range, is in cultivation and some wild populations occur in protected areas (Cardamom Mountains Protected Forest, Cambodia and Khlong Yai Wildlife Sanctuary, Thailand). However this taxa may be resolved into a number of species with a more restricted range. It is this that has led to the conservation classification.

== Vernacular names ==
- krâva:nh (Khmer language)
- cardamome (French language)
- Siam cardamom (English)

== Uses ==
The plant is used as a food and in medicine. In Cambodia the young leaves are consumed in Sâmlâ ("Cambodian curries"). The rhizomes, fruit and seeds are edible, with the seeds being used as a spice. Amongst households harvesting forest plants from Nam Nao National Park, Thailand, this species represented about 6% of the income earned from the sale of herbs and spices. As well as a direct food source, W. vera is used as a fermentation starter in traditional rice wine production in Cambodia.

In the 18th and 19th centuries, the Kingdom of Siam maintained a political and economic hegemony/network in northwest Cambodia, ensuring a supply of a variety of products, including this spice species, to export to China and Europe.

In the Khmer medical text The Treatment of Four Diseases palm-leaf manuscript, written in the late 19th–early 20th century, the plant is used in 3 compounds to treat hernia/constipation/sharp pains/prolapsed uterus, leprosy-ulcers, and cerebral palsy.

In Cambodian traditional medicine the rhizomes are considered stimulating and useful for fever. The fruits were exported to Hong Kong, where in Chinese traditional medicine they were considered a remedy against all intestinal troubles. The seeds were exported to Europe, where in older medical practice they were used against stomachache and as a tonic. Fruits are "[e]xported to Europe where it is used to flavour sausages and cordials." The fruit and young leaves "gives a nice flavour". Eastern Thai people use it to treat dyspepsia and flatulence caused by indigestion, in food products as a flavouring agent, and in the pharmaceutical industry in aromatherapy products for skin stimulation and as a bath product "for skin". As of October 2020 there were two commercially available Traditional Chinese Medicine formulations containing W. vera, among many other ingredients, used in the management of viral pneumonia in China.

Note: while there are a number of active ingredients present in the plant, the medical and pharmaceutical claims do not appear to have direct evidence.
