= FairWild =

FairWild Foundation
- Type: International organisation
- Founded: 2008
- Headquarters: Offices in Switzerland and Cambridge, UK
- Key people: Franziska Staubli, Chair of Board of Trustees; Deborah Vorhies, Chief Executive Officer; Bryony Morgan, Programme Manager
- Products: FairWild Standard
- Services: Sustainability and fair trade certification of wild-collected plant ingredients, conservation
- Website: www.fairwild.org

The FairWild Foundation is an international organization that aims to provide a global framework for a sustainable and fair trading system for wild-collected plant ingredients and their products. It was established in 2008 in response to the major ecological and social challenges created by the ever-increasing demand for wild plant ingredients used in food, cosmetics, well-being and medicinal products.

The organization's programme of work is based around the FairWild Standard and certification system, a set of sustainability principles to guide the adoption of sustainable and fair trading practices through the value chain for wild-harvested products, and provision of assurance that sustainable practices for wild harvesting are being adhered to.

== FairWild Standard ==
The current FairWild Standard version 2.0 was published in 2010. It combined two precursor standards, i.e. the FairWild Standard 1.0 (developed by the Swiss Import Promotion Programme in cooperation with Forum Essenzia e.V and Institute for Marketecology) with the International Standard for Sustainable Wild Collection of Medicinal and Aromatic Plants (ISSC-MAP, developed by the German Federal Agency for Nature Conservation (BfN), TRAFFIC, WWF, and International Union for Conservation of Nature., and drew on practical experience gained through application of the Standard in the field. Its implementation aims to support efforts to ensure plants are managed, harvested and traded in a way that maintains populations in the wild and benefits rural producers.

The FairWild Standard provides guidelines in the following key areas:

- Maintaining wild plant resources with no negative environmental impacts.
- Complying with laws, regulations and agreements.
- Respecting customary rights and benefit sharing.
- Promoting fair contractual agreements between operators and collectors, and ensuring fair trade benefits for collectors and their communities.
- Ensuring fair working conditions for all workers.
- Applying responsible business and management practices.

== FairWild Certification ==
Use of FairWild Certification is intended to provide consumers with the assurance that wild-harvested products are produced in a socially and ecologically sound manner. Certification is currently available to companies and cooperatives that manage harvesting and processing of the wild collected products, with other companies in the chain of custody for FairWild certified ingredients required to register with the FairWild Foundation before the FairWild label can be displayed on manufactured products.

Certification is based on review of a number of factors including resource assessment, management plans, sustainable collecting practices, cost calculation along the supply chain, traceability of goods and finances, and documented fair trading practices. FairWild is only applicable to wild harvested plants (except for timber products), lichens and fungi, and does not include cultivated plants.

=== Products ===
FairWild certified ingredients are available from producer companies in a number of countries worldwide. Certification audits (according to FairWild Standard version 1.0) began in 2007, with the first products containing FairWild-certified ingredients available on the market in 2009. Currently, products containing certified ingredients include herbal teas, frankincense, and components of traditional Chinese medicines (TCM). FairWild sustainable use projects are being implemented in various regions around the world in cooperation with non-governmental organizations and government agencies, as well as private sector partners.

== FairWild and International Policy ==
The FairWild Standard is useful for bridging the gap between existing broad conservation guidelines and managing plans developed for specific local conditions.

=== FairWild and the Convention on the International Trade in Endangered species of Fauna and Flora (CITES) ===
Countries exporting plants and animals species listed in Appendix II of CITES are required to demonstrate a level of export that is not detrimental to the survival of that species. This is achieved through the compilation of a Non-detriment finding (NDF) by CITES scientific authorities in the country of origin. The ecological criteria of the FairWild Standard have been used to inform development of guidelines for conducting NDFs.

=== FairWild and the Convention on Biological Diversity (CBD) ===
The GSPC (Global Strategy for Plant Conservation), adopted by the CBD in 2002, covers issues of sustainable use of plant diversity and benefit-sharing with the aim to contribute to the alleviation of poverty and sustainable development via inclusion of such targets in government policy. The FairWild Standard has been listed in a tool kit developed to help countries implement the GSPC (Targets 11 and 12).

== FairWild Week ==
FairWild Week, founded in 2017, is the organization's annual event used to raise awareness of the importance of wild plants and their sustainable harvest.
