= Wurfbainia uliginosa =

Scientific classification
- Kingdom: Plantae
- Clade: Tracheophytes
- Clade: Angiosperms
- Clade: Monocots
- Clade: Commelinids
- Order: Zingiberales
- Family: Zingiberaceae
- Subfamily: Alpinioideae
- Tribe: Alpinieae
- Genus: Wurfbainia
- Species: W. uliginosa

Binomial name
- Wurfbainia uliginosa (J.Koenig) Giseke

Synonyms
- Amomum ovoideum Pierre ex Gagnep.; Amomum robustum K.Schum.; Amomum uliginosum J.Koenig; Cardamomum uliginosum (J.Koenig) Kuntze

Species of flowering plant

Wurfbainia uliginosa is the type species of the recently reconstituted plant genus Wurfbainia in the ginger family. Its native range is from Indo-China to Sumatra.
