= Amomum smithiae =

Scientific classification
- Kingdom: Plantae
- Clade: Tracheophytes
- Clade: Angiosperms
- Clade: Monocots
- Clade: Commelinids
- Order: Zingiberales
- Family: Zingiberaceae
- Genus: Amomum
- Species: A. smithiae

Binomial name
- Amomum smithiae (Y.K.Kam) Skornick. & Hlavatá

Species of flowering plant

Amomum smithiae is a monocotyledonous plant species originally described by Yee Kiew Kam as Elettariopsis smithiae in the family Zingiberaceae. No subspecies are listed in the Catalogue of Life.

Amomum smithiae is native to Malaysia and Thailand.

It is named in honour of Scottish botanist Rosemary Margaret Smith.
