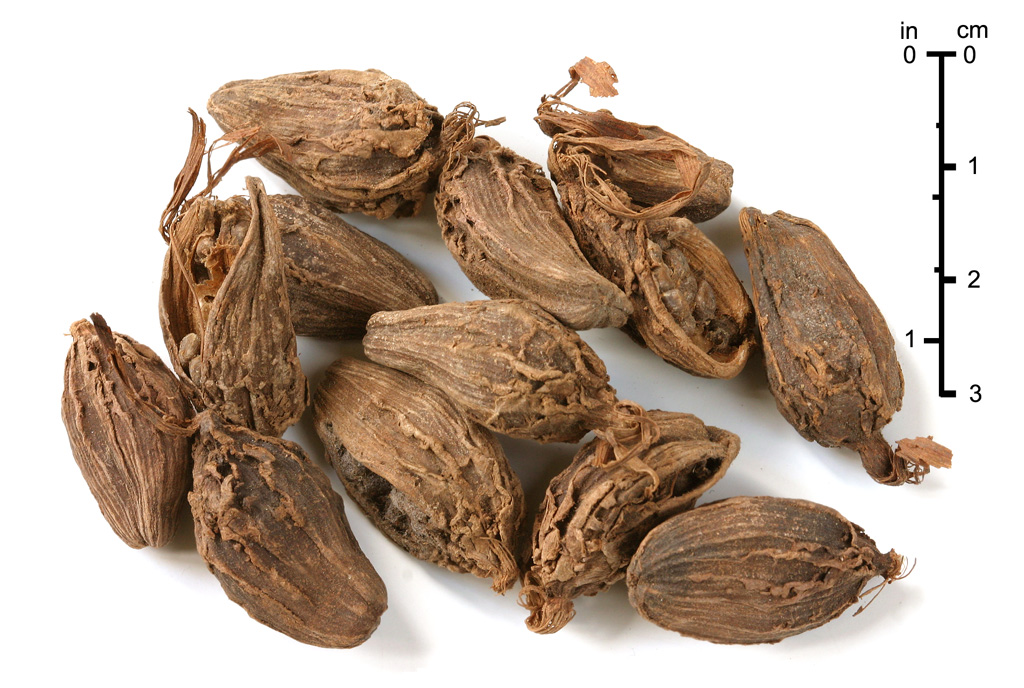
- Black cardamom fruit as used as spice

Conservation status
- Data Deficient (IUCN 3.1)

Scientific classification
- Kingdom: Plantae
- Clade: Embryophytes
- Clade: Tracheophytes
- Clade: Angiosperms
- Clade: Monocots
- Clade: Commelinids
- Order: Zingiberales
- Family: Zingiberaceae
- Genus: Amomum
- Species: A. subulatum

Binomial name
- Amomum subulatum Roxb.

Synonyms
- Cardamomum subulatum (Roxb.) Kuntze

= Black cardamom =

Species of herbaceous plant

Amomum subulatum, also known as black cardamom, hill cardamom, Bengal cardamom, greater cardamom, Indian cardamom, Nepal cardamom, winged cardamom, big cardamon, or brown cardamom, is a perennial herbaceous plant in the family Zingiberaceae. Its seed pods have a strong, camphor-like flavour, with a smoky character derived from the method of drying.

== Characteristics ==
The pods are used as spice, in a similar manner to green cardamom pods but with a different flavour. Unlike green cardamom, this spice is rarely used in sweet dishes. Its smoky flavour and aroma derive from traditional methods of drying over open flames.

== Species ==
At least two distinct species are called black cardamom: Amomum subulatum (also known as Nepal cardamom) and Lanxangia tsaoko (formerly Amomum tsao-ko). The pods of A. subulatum, used primarily in the cuisines of India and certain regional cuisines of Pakistan, are the smaller of the two, while the larger pods of L. tsaoko (Chinese: wiktionary:草果; pinyin: cǎoguǒ; Vietnamese: thảo quả) are used in Vietnamese cuisine and Chinese cuisine, particularly that of Sichuan province.

== Agricultural production ==
The largest producer of black cardamom is Nepal, followed by India and Bhutan.

== Medical use ==
In traditional Chinese medicine, black cardamom is used for stomach disorders and malaria. In the traditional medicine of Nepal & India, the decoction of Amomum subulatum rhizomes is used in the therapy of jaundice.

== See also ==
- Cardamom
- Lanxangia tsaoko
- Aframomum corrorima
