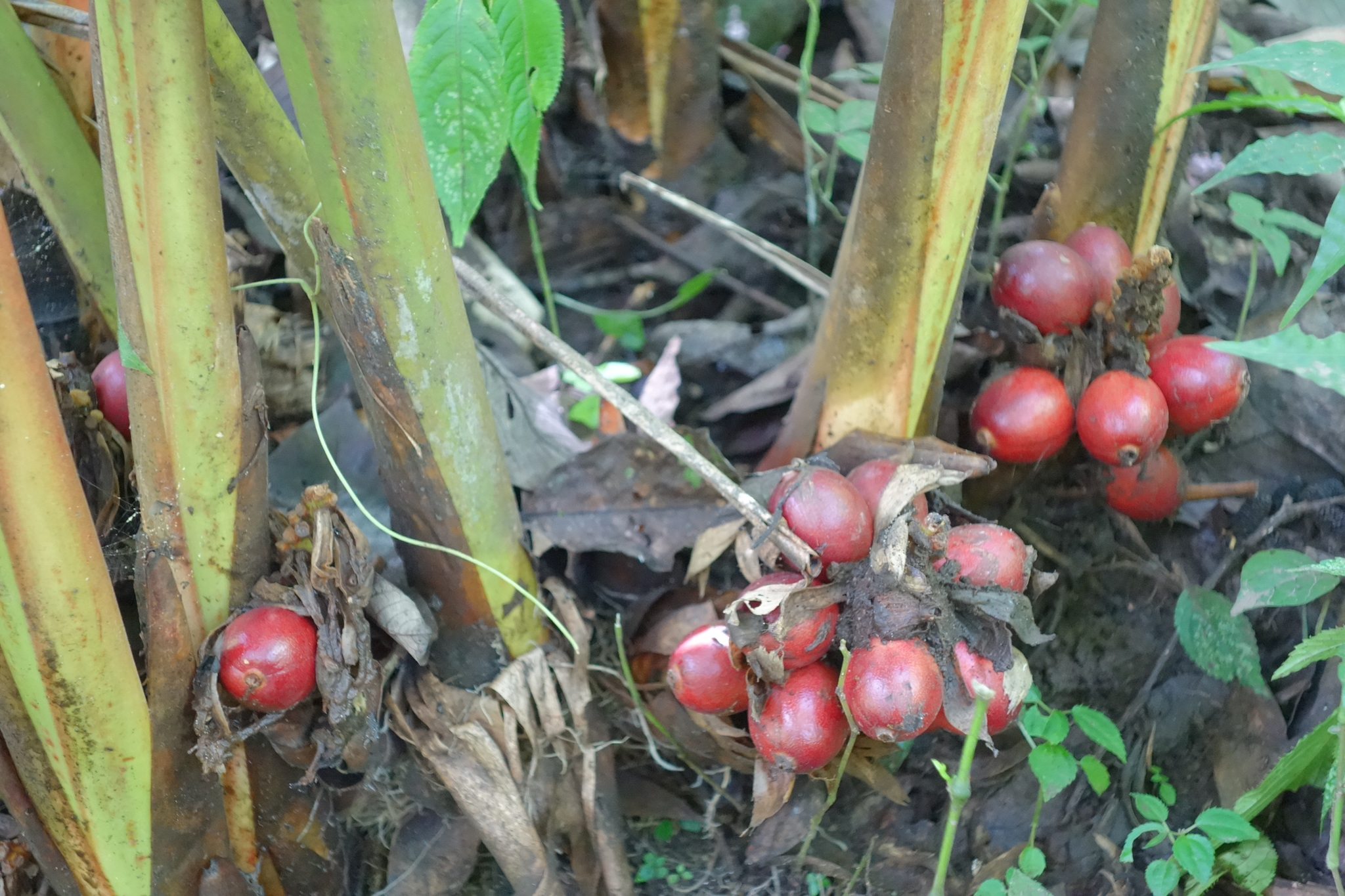

Conservation status
- Near Threatened (IUCN 3.1)

Scientific classification
- Kingdom: Plantae
- Clade: Tracheophytes
- Clade: Angiosperms
- Clade: Monocots
- Clade: Commelinids
- Order: Zingiberales
- Family: Zingiberaceae
- Genus: Lanxangia
- Species: L. tsao-ko

Binomial name
- Lanxangia tsao-ko (Crevost & Lemarié) M.F.Newman & Škorničk.

Synonyms
- Amomum tsao-ko Crevost & Lemarié; Amomum hongtsaoko C.F.Liang & D.Fang.

= Lanxangia tsaoko =

Species of plant

Lanxangia tsao-ko, formerly Amomum tsao-ko, and also known as red cardamom or Chinese black cardamom, is a ginger-like plant known in English by the transliterated Chinese name (Chinese: 草果; pinyin: cǎoguǒ; Jyutping: cou^{2} gwo^{2}; Pe̍h-ōe-jī: chháu-kó). It grows at high altitudes in Yunnan, as well as the northern highlands of Vietnam. Both wild and cultivated plants are used medicinally and also in cooking. The dried fruit of the plant has a pungent, gingery taste.

== See also ==
- Black cardamom
