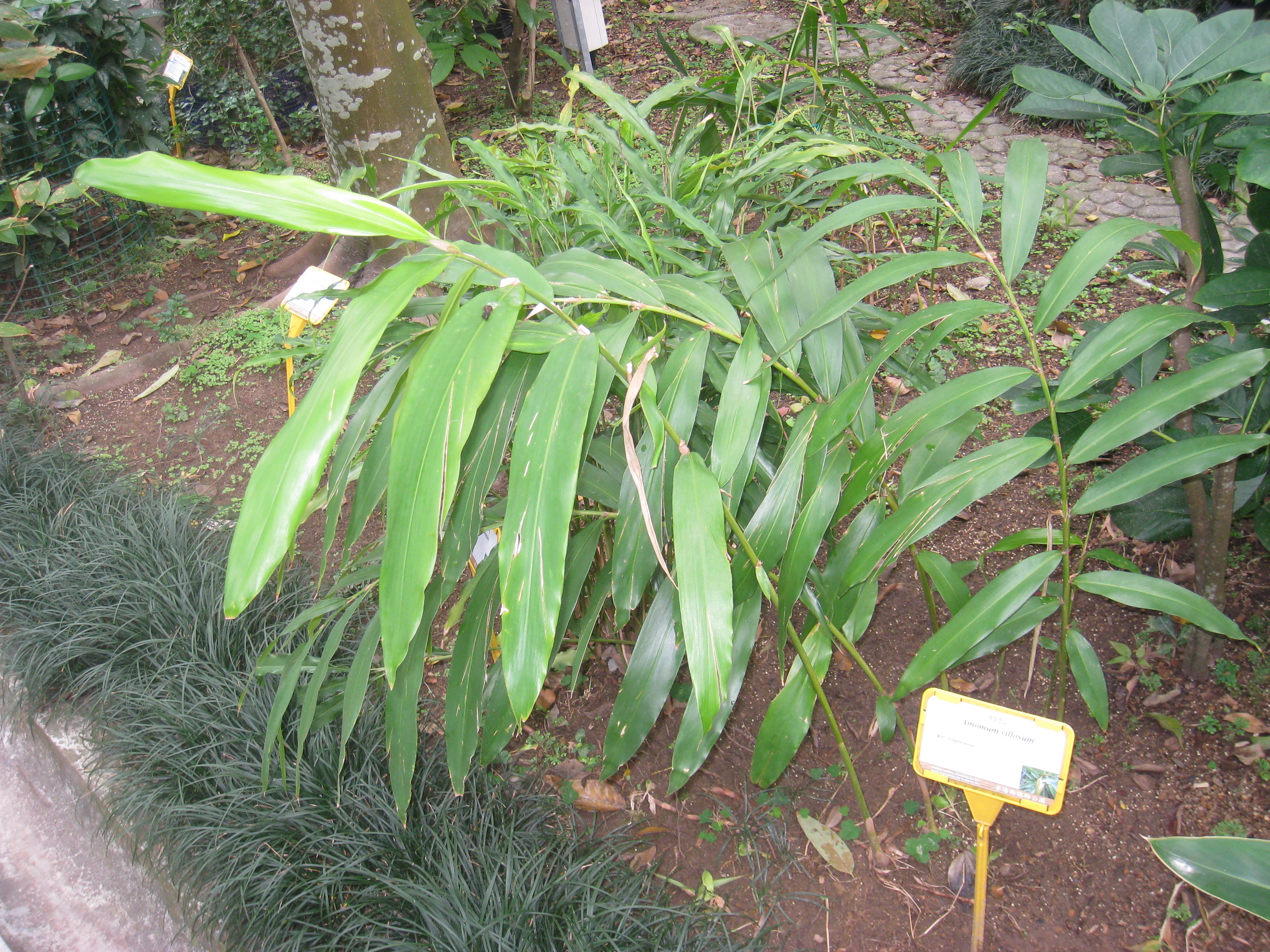
- W villosa at the Hong Kong Botanical Garden

Conservation status
- Least Concern (IUCN 3.1)

Scientific classification
- Kingdom: Plantae
- Clade: Tracheophytes
- Clade: Angiosperms
- Clade: Monocots
- Clade: Commelinids
- Order: Zingiberales
- Family: Zingiberaceae
- Genus: Wurfbainia
- Species: W. villosa

Binomial name
- Wurfbainia villosa (Lour.) Skornick. & A.D.Poulsen

Synonyms
- Amomum villosum Lour.; Cardamomum villosum (Lour.) Kuntze; Elettaria villosa (Lour.) Miq.; Zingiber villosum (Lour.) Stokes

= Wurfbainia villosa =

Species of flowering plant

Wurfbainia villosa, also known by its basionym Amomum villosum, (Chinese: 砂仁; pinyin: shārén) is a plant in the ginger family which is grown as a cardamom-like spice throughout Southeast Asia and South China. Like cardamom, the plant is cultivated for its fruits, dry capsules containing strongly aromatic seeds. W. villosa is an evergreen monocotyledonous plant 1.5 to 3.0 m in height, the branches and leaves of which are similar to those of ginger. It grows in the shade of trees and has a reproductive peculiarity whereby those flowers borne on creeping growth at ground level will set fruit, while those borne on aerial branches will not. It blooms in March and April, the colour, translucency and waxy lustre of the flowers being likened traditionally to those of white jade.

== Use in cuisine ==
The seed of Wurfbainia villosa is used as a spice in Chinese cuisine, in which it can also form an ingredient in certain recipes for the traditional spice mixture known as five-spice powder. From as early as the time of the Tang dynasty, many ancient books, including, notably, the Compendium of Materia Medica, have been unanimous in describing the taste of W. villosa as "acrid, fresh, and slightly bitter".

== Conservation ==
Due to the demand for seeds and ripe fruits, and to curb slash-and-burn activities in forests by local populations, cultivation of W. villosa and coplantings with rubber trees has been encouraged by the governments of Yunnan and Guangdong, China. However, the extensive cultivation of W. villosa in forests has resulted in the reduction of species diversity in the rainforests of Southwest China.
