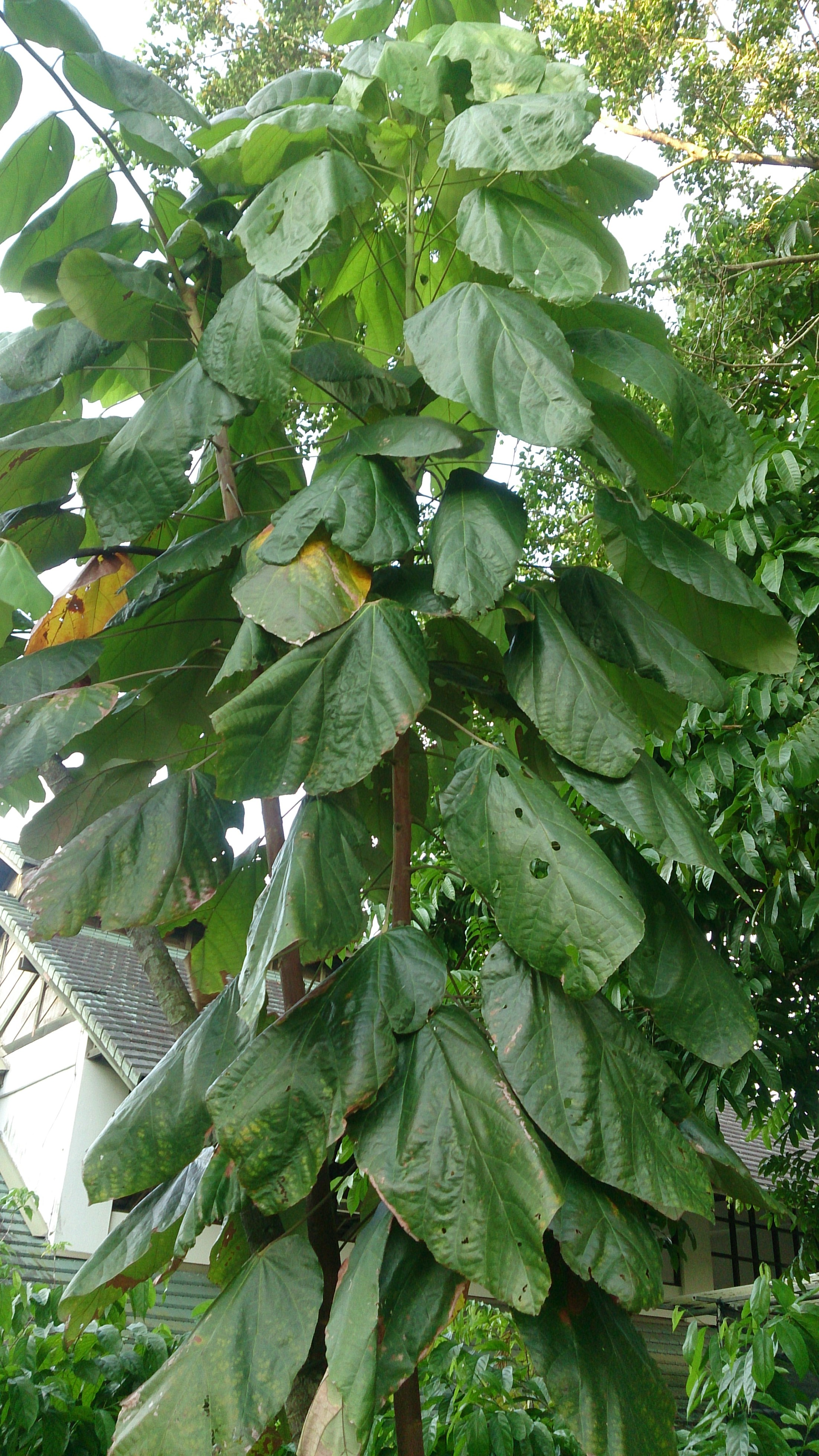

Conservation status
- Least Concern (IUCN 3.1)

Scientific classification
- Kingdom: Plantae
- Clade: Tracheophytes
- Clade: Angiosperms
- Clade: Eudicots
- Clade: Rosids
- Order: Malvales
- Family: Malvaceae
- Genus: Theobroma
- Species: T. bicolor

Binomial name
- Theobroma bicolor Humb. & Bonpl.

Synonyms
- Theobroma ovatifolia Moc & Sessé ex DC. Cacao bicolor (Humb. & Bonpl.) Poir; Tribroma bicolor (Humb. & Bonpl.) Cook; Theobroma cordata Rufz & Pavón

= Theobroma bicolor =

Species of tree

Theobroma bicolor, known commonly as the mocambo tree, jaguar tree, balamte, or pataxte, among various other common names, is a tree in the genus Theobroma (family Malvaceae), which also contains the better-known Theobroma cacao (cocoa tree). It is found in Central and South America, including stretches of the Amazon rainforest in Brazil, Colombia, Ecuador, and Peru.

== Taxonomy ==
Theobroma bicolor is the only species in the Rhytidocarpus section of Theobroma. It was described by Alexander von Humboldt and Aimé Bonpland in 1808.

== Description ==
Theobroma bicolor can reach a height of 3–8 metres in open fields, although in the understories of forests it can grow to 25–30 metres. It is a slow-growing tree and grows best in loose, unconsolidated soils. It is adapted to survive flooding at a minimal level, but can sometimes last in deeper floods. In the central Amazon region, the tree produces fruit from March to November, and flowers from July to September.

Similar to its close relative, the cacao tree, the mocambo tree's seeds are edible, high in calories, and rich in protein and fiber. The seeds are also high in omega 9 and contain caffeine.

== Cultivation and use ==
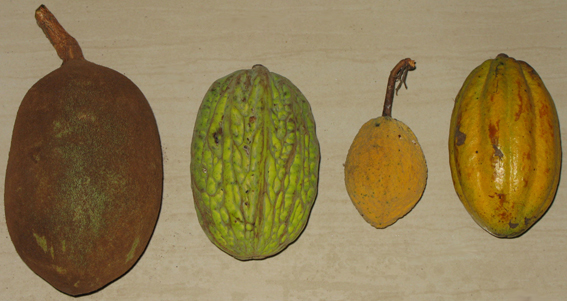
From left to right: The fruits of T. grandiflorum, T. bicolor, T. speciosum, and T. cacao

Theobroma bicolor was historically cultivated by the Aztecs alongside T. cacao for production of chocolate, although when chocolate was introduced to the Spaniards, they considered the product of T. bicolor to be of a lower quality. Its seeds can also be eaten fried or in soups, and the seed pods when emptied are used as planters and containers. The pulp which surrounds the seeds can be eaten fresh, and has a sweet, mild taste.

When the fruit is ripe, it naturally detaches from the tree branches and falls to the ground; the general method of harvesting is collecting the fallen fruit.

The Maya placed a high value on the buttery foam crowning beverages of cacao and maize, according to descriptions from the time of the Conquista, and it appears that a thick, stable foam can be produced using fruits of T. bicolor as source of cacao, but not with T. cacao fruits.

== Pests ==
Moniliophthora perniciosa, a fungus which causes "witch's broom disease" on T. cacao, was reported on a Brazilian specimen of T. bicolor in 1999.
