= Jorquette =

The jorquette (horqueta; molinillo) is the point at which the vertical stem changes to fan growth on the cocoa tree (Theobroma cacao).

The whorl of lateral branches which grow out at an angle of approximately 45 degrees is called the jorquette.

For mostly of Theobroma sp, one of the two kinds of branch grows vertically upwards, (these are the trunk which grows until it is 1.5 metres (4.9 ft) tall, and the chupons), and the other kind grows obliquely outwards, growing 3-5 lateral branches emerge apparently of the same level though each comes from a separate node.

Criollo cacao frequently produces 3 to 5 laterals in a jorquette which, however, show a distinct space between their points of origin on the main stem, whereas, in Forastero cacao, the laterals all come off at the same level. When the tree matures, the bases of the laterals form a single ring.

Subsequently, the tree development produces chupons from below the first jorquette to form another storey of fan branches from a second jorquette, a process which may be repeated. Selective pruning seeks for the jorquettes to achieve maximum light absorption efficiency.
