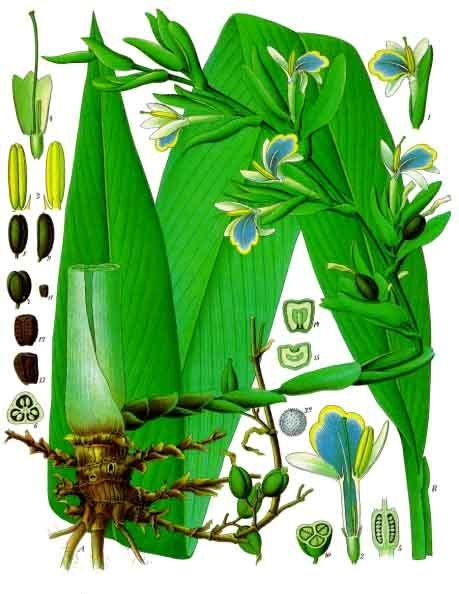
- True cardamom (Elettaria cardamomum); 1896 illustration
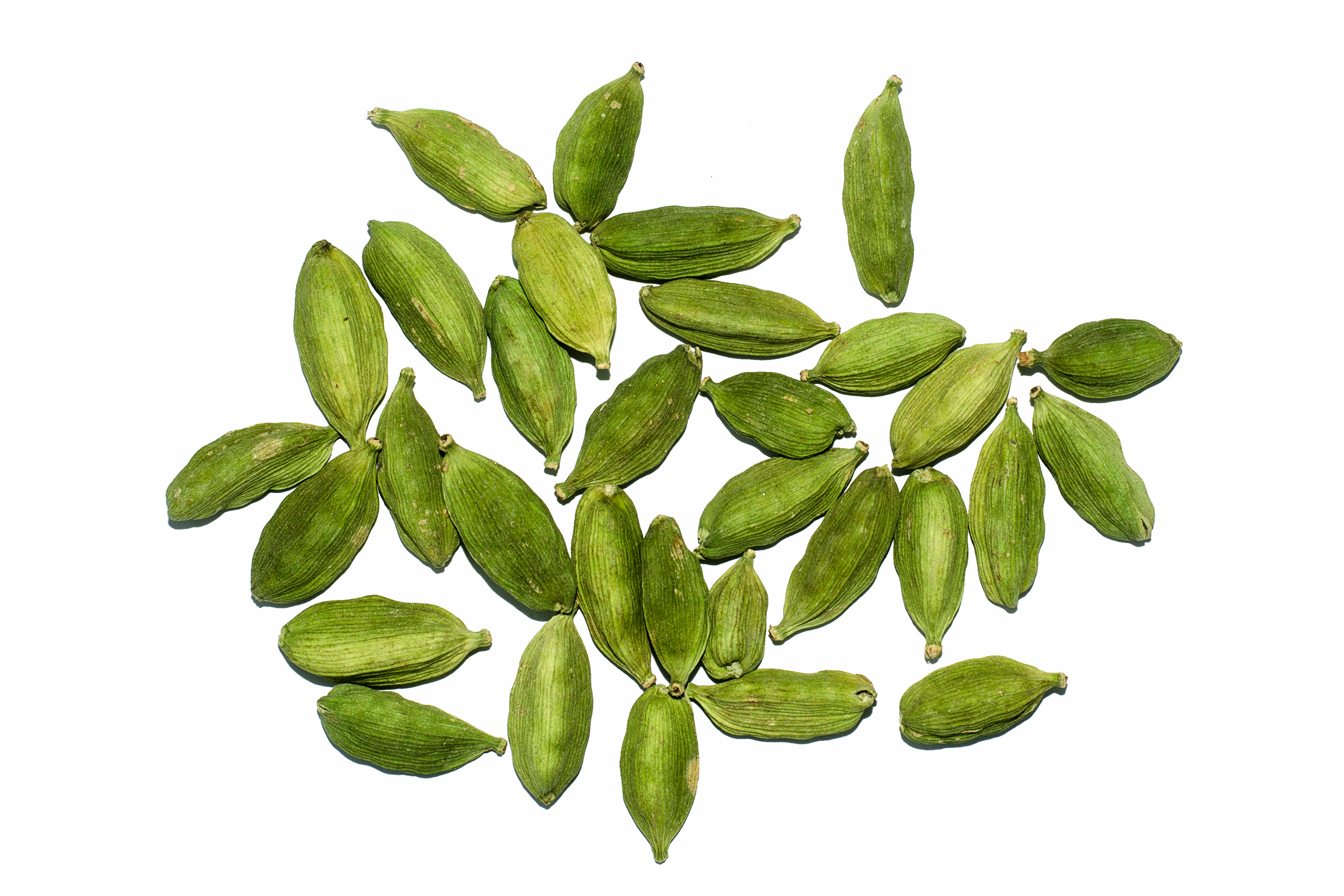
- Pods

Scientific classification
- Kingdom: Plantae
- Clade: Tracheophytes
- Clade: Angiosperms
- Clade: Monocots
- Clade: Commelinids
- Order: Zingiberales
- Family: Zingiberaceae
- Genus: Elettaria
- Species: E. cardamomum

Binomial name
- Elettaria cardamomum (L.) Maton

Synonyms
- Amomum cardamomum L.; Amomum repens Sonn., illegitimate superfluous name; Amomum racemosum Lam., illegitimate superfluous name; Alpinia cardamomum (L.) Roxb.; Cardamomum officinale Salisb.; Zingiber cardamomum (L.) Stokes; Matonia cardamomum (L.) Stephenson & J.M.Churchill; Cardamomum verum Oken, illegitimate superfluous name; Elettaria repens Baill., illegitimate superfluous name; Elettaria cardamomum var. minor Watt, not validly published; Cardamomum elletari Garsault, rejected name; Zingiber minus Gaertn.; Amomum ensal Raeusch.; Amomum uncinatum Stokes; Cardamomum malabaricum Pritz.; Cardamomum minus (Gaertn.) Kuntze; Elettaria cardamomum var. minuscula Burkill, without description

= Elettaria cardamomum =

Species of flowering plant

Elettaria cardamomum, commonly known as green cardamom or true cardamom, is a herbaceous, perennial plant in the ginger family, native to southern India. It is the most common of the species whose seeds are used as a spice called cardamom that has a strong aroma used in both savory and sweet cooking. It is cultivated widely in tropical regions and reportedly naturalized in Réunion, Indochina, and Costa Rica.

== Growth ==
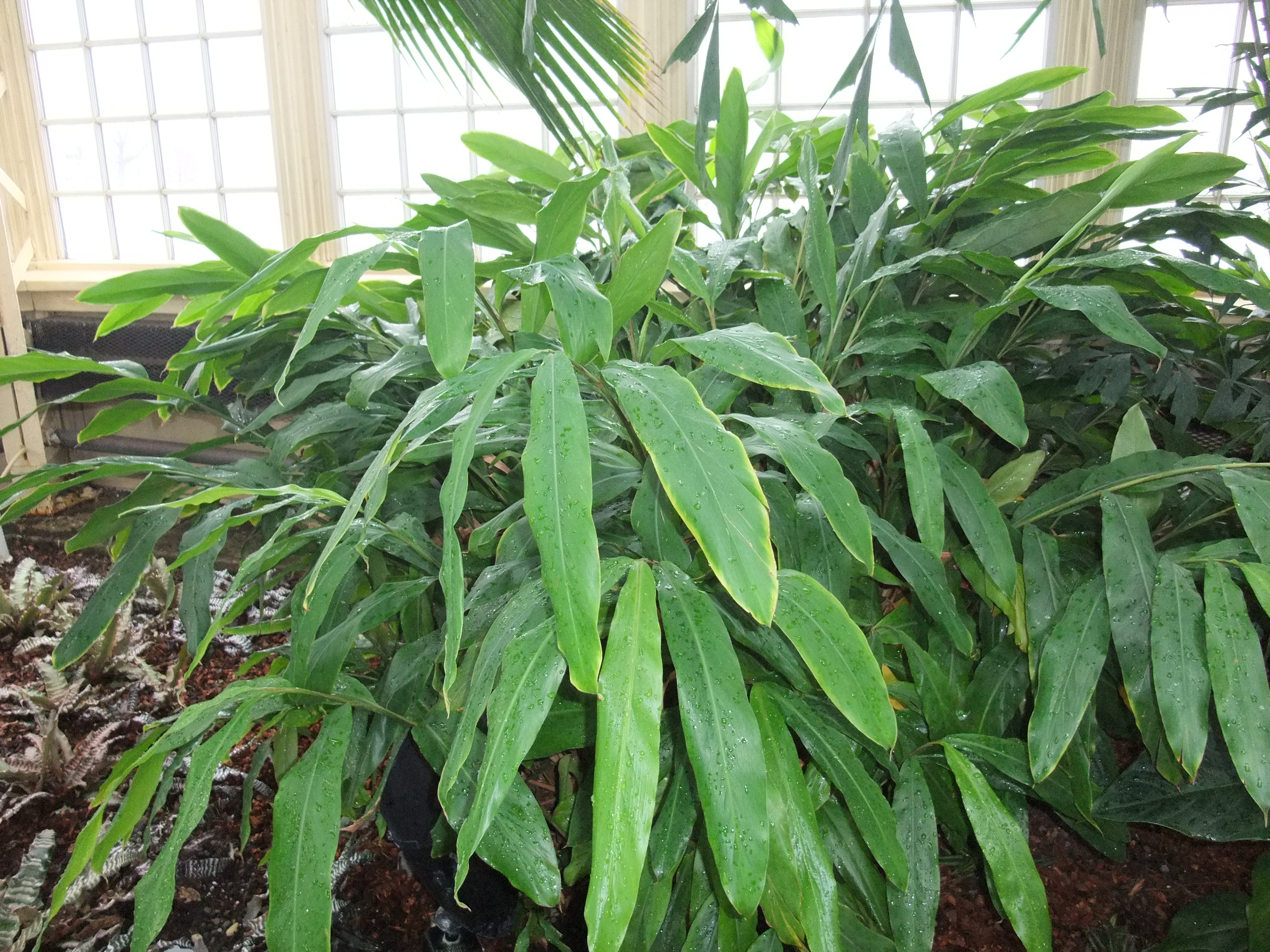

Elettaria cardamomum is a pungent, aromatic, herbaceous, perennial plant, growing to about 2–4 m (6 ft 7 in – 13 ft 1 in) in height. The leaves are alternate in two ranks, linear-lanceolate, 40–60 cm (16–24 in) long, with a long pointed tip. The flowers are white to lilac or pale violet, produced in a loose spike 30–60 cm (12–24 in) long. The fruit is a three-sided yellow-green pod 1–2 cm (0.39–0.79 in) long, containing several (15-20) black and brown seeds.

== Use ==
The green seed pods of the plant are dried and the seeds inside the pod are used in Indian and other Asian cuisines, either whole or ground. It is the most widely cultivated species of cardamom; for other types and uses, see cardamom.

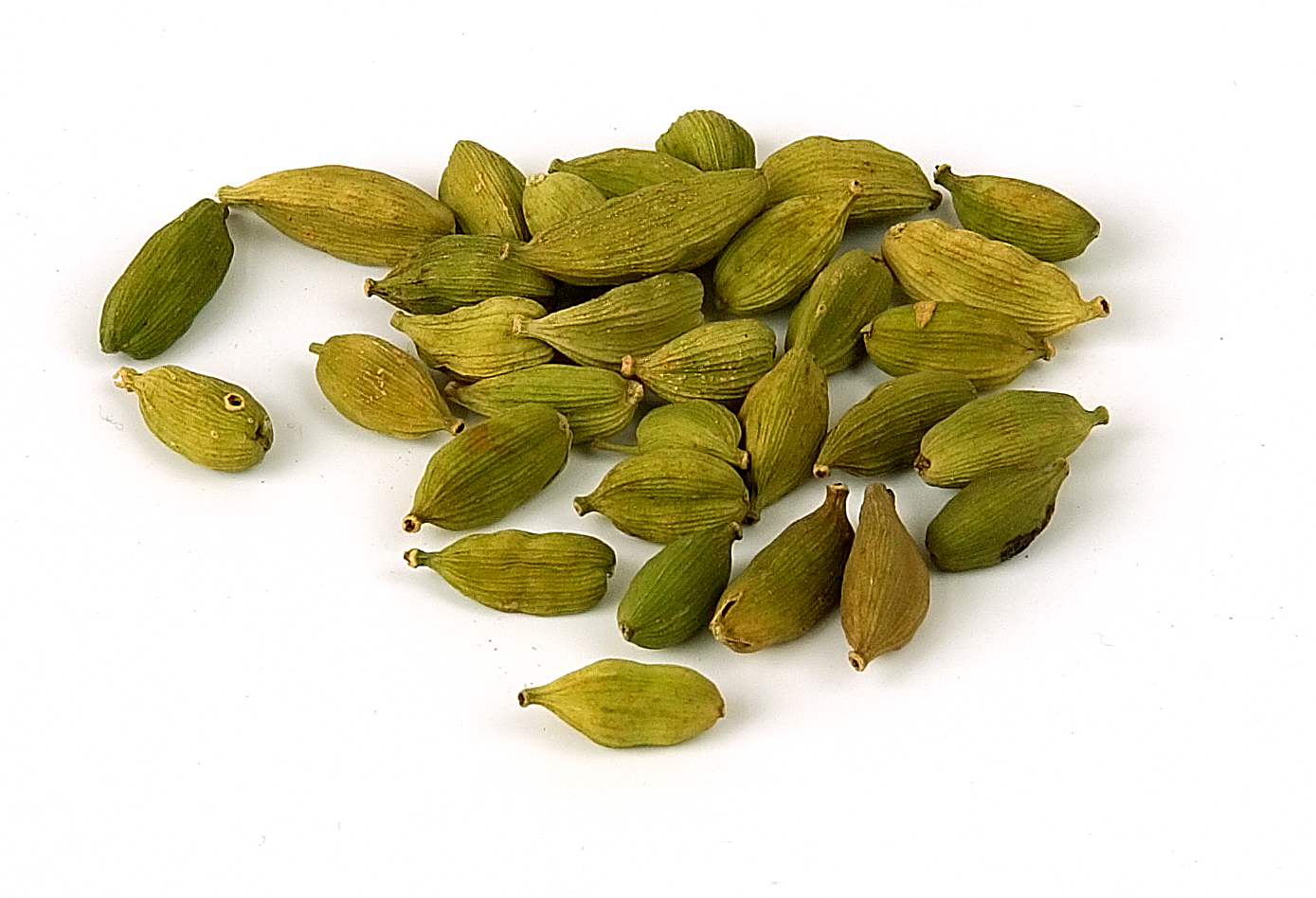
Cardamom pods as used as spice

True cardamom may have been used in Ayurveda medicine as early as the 4th century BC. Ground cardamom is an ingredient in many Indian curries and is a primary contributor to the flavour of masala chai. In Iran and India, cardamom is used to flavour coffee and tea. Cardamom has been used medicinally in traditional practices for nausea, kidney disorders, gum infections, and cataracts.

In addition to its native range, it is grown in Nepal, Vietnam, Cambodia, Thailand, Sri Lanka, and Central America. In India, the states of Sikkim and Kerala are the main producers of cardamom; they rank highest both in cultivated area and in production.

== Biology ==
The primary volatile components are terpinyl acetate and eucalyptol.

== Ecology ==
E. cardamomum is used as a food plant by the larvae of the moth Endoclita hosei.

== Varieties ==
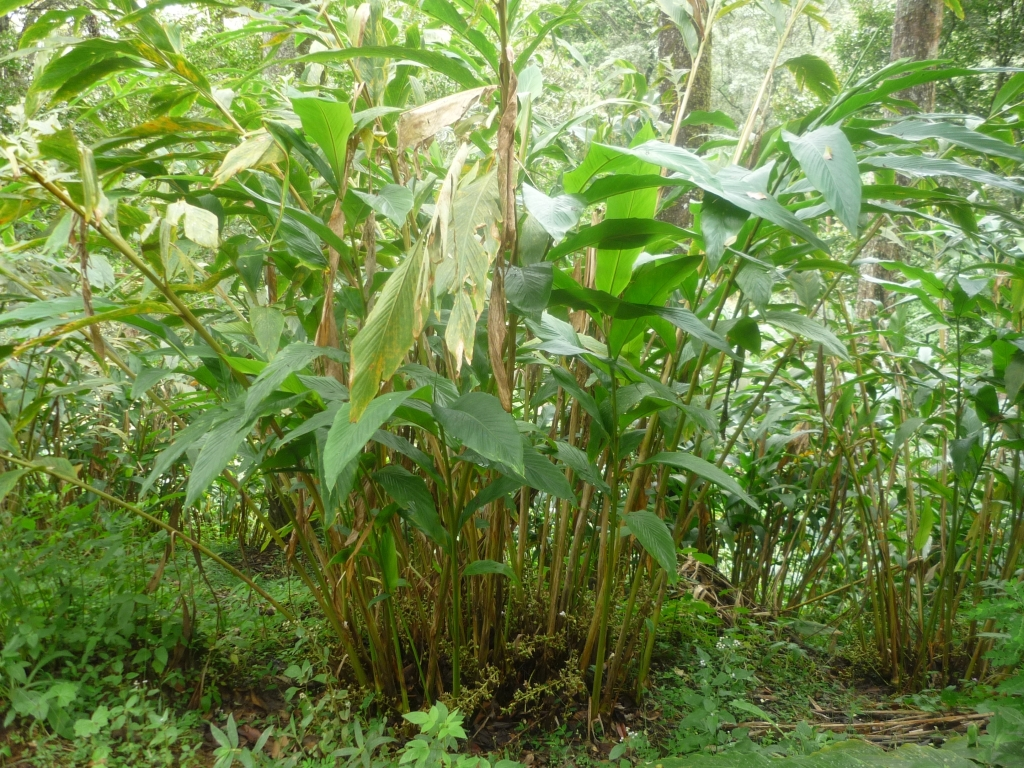
Cardamom plant

The three natural varieties of green cardamom plants are:

- Malabar (Nadan/native), as the name suggests, is the native variety of Kerala. These plants have floral racemes (which bear the pods) that grow horizontally along the ground.
- Mysore, as the name suggests, is a native variety of Karnataka. These plants have floral racemes which grow vertically upwards. The Mysore variety has declined, however, in the past few decades owing to the emergence of the more resistant and better-yielding 'Green Gold' variety, and which is the most common form of cardamom harvested in Kerala.
- Vazhuka is a naturally occurring hybrid between Malabar and Mysore varieties, and the panicles grow neither vertically nor horizontally, but in between.

Recently, a few planters isolated high-yielding plants and started multiplying them on a large scale. The most popular high-yielding variety is 'Njallani', which is a unique high-yielding cardamom variety developed by an Indian farmer, Sebastian Joseph, at Kattappana in the South Indian state of Kerala. K. J. Baby of Idukki District, Kerala, has developed a purely white-flowered variety of Vazhuka type green cardamom having higher yield than 'Njallani'. The variety has high adaptability to different shade conditions and can be grown in waterlogged areas.
