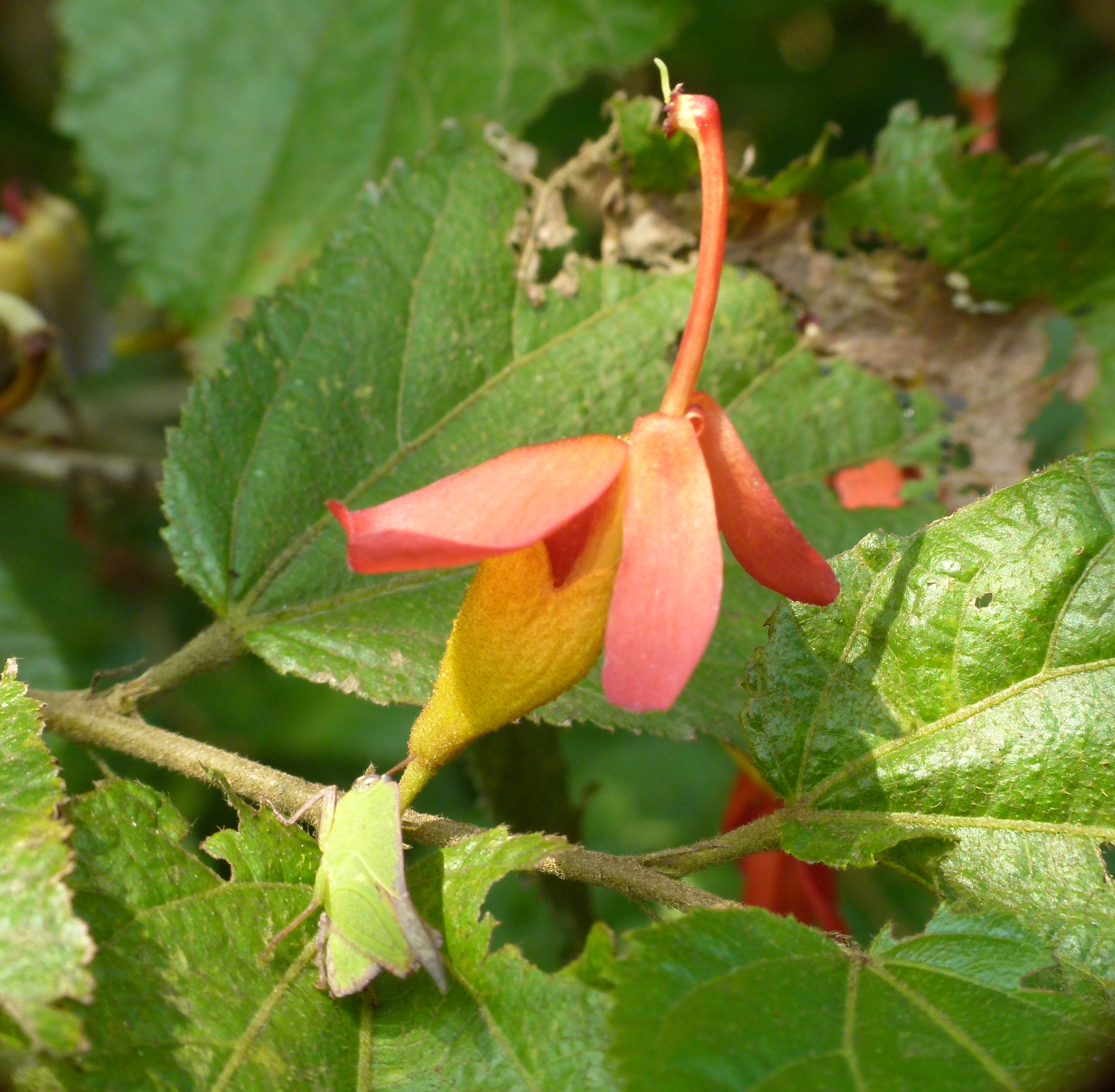
- Flower

Scientific classification
- Kingdom: Plantae
- Clade: Tracheophytes
- Clade: Angiosperms
- Clade: Eudicots
- Clade: Rosids
- Order: Malvales
- Family: Malvaceae
- Genus: Helicteres
- Species: H. isora

Binomial name
- Helicteres isora L.

Synonyms
- Helicteres baruensis var. ovata DC.; Helicteres chrysocalyx Miq. ex Mast.; Helicteres corylifolia Buch.-Ham. ex Dillwyn; Helicteres grewiaefolia DC.; Helicteres isora var. glabrescens Mast.; Helicteres isora var. microphylla Hassk.; Helicteres isora var. tomentosa Mast.; Helicteres macrophylla Wight ex Wight & Arnold; Helicteres ovata var. fructus-regis Lam.; Helicteres ovata var. isora-murri Lam.; Helicteres roxburghii G. Don; Helicteres versicolor Hassk.; Isora corylifolia Schott & Endl.; Isora grewiaefolia (DC.) Schott & Endl.; Isora versicolor Hassk.; Ixora versicolor Hassk.

= Helicteres isora =

Species of flowering plant

Helicteres isora, sometimes called the Indian screw tree, is a small tree or large shrub found in southern Asia and northern Oceania. It is usually assigned to the family Malvaceae, but it is sometimes assigned to the family Sterculiaceae. The red flowers are pollinated mainly by sunbirds, butterflies, and Hymenoptera. In the 19th century fibers from the bark were used to make rope and sacks, although nowadays the tree is harvested for the fruits and roots which are used in folk medicine.

== Common names ==
- Sanskrit - Avartani, avartphala
- Hindi - Marorphali (मरोड़ फली ), bhendu, jonkphal
- English - Indian screw tree, East Indian screw tree, deer's horn
- Marathi - Kewad, muradsheng (मुरुड शेंग)
- Bengali - Antamora (আঁতমোড়া)
- Gujarati - Maradashingh
- Kannada - Yedmuri
- Tamil - valampuri (வலம்புரி)
- Telugu - valambiri (వలంబిరి); vadambiri (వడంబిరి)
- Malayalam - Idampiri valampiri (ഇടംപിരി വലംപിരി|ഇടംപിരി വലംപിരി)
- Thai - S̄amunpra pai ka bid (สมุนไพรปอกะบิด)
- Sinhala - Liniya (ලීනිය)

Other vernacular names include mochra, mudmudika, kurkurbicha, sinkri, valumbari, yedamuri, pita baranda, balampari, guvadarra, pedamuri, ishwarmuri, murmuriya, and vurkatee. In Indonesia it is called buah kayu ules or ulet-ulet on Java. Odia: Modi modika( ମୋଡି ମୋଡ଼ିକା)

== Description ==
H. isora is a small tree or large shrub, five to eight metres in height. It has grey bark and alternately arranged, hairy, ovate leaves with serrate margins. Its flowers are brick red or orange-red, and its fruits are green when raw, brown or grey when dried, and twisted, with a screw at its pointed end. Seeds of the plant are black or brown and are highly polished, roughly rhomboid, and rectangular or triangular. Pollinators of the flower include the jungle babbler, the golden-fronted leafbird, the ashy drongo, and the white-bellied drongo.

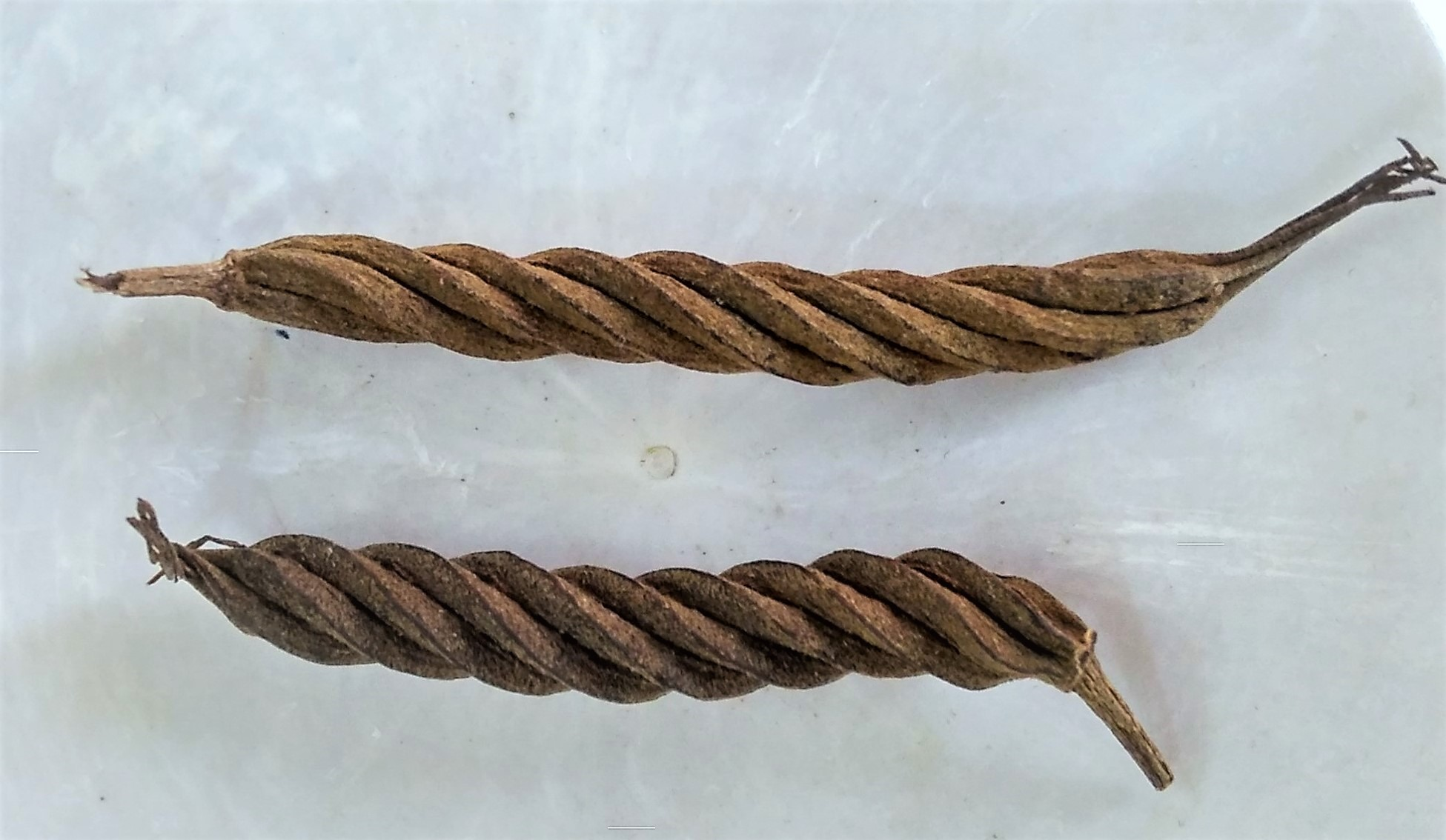
Dried fruits of H. isora

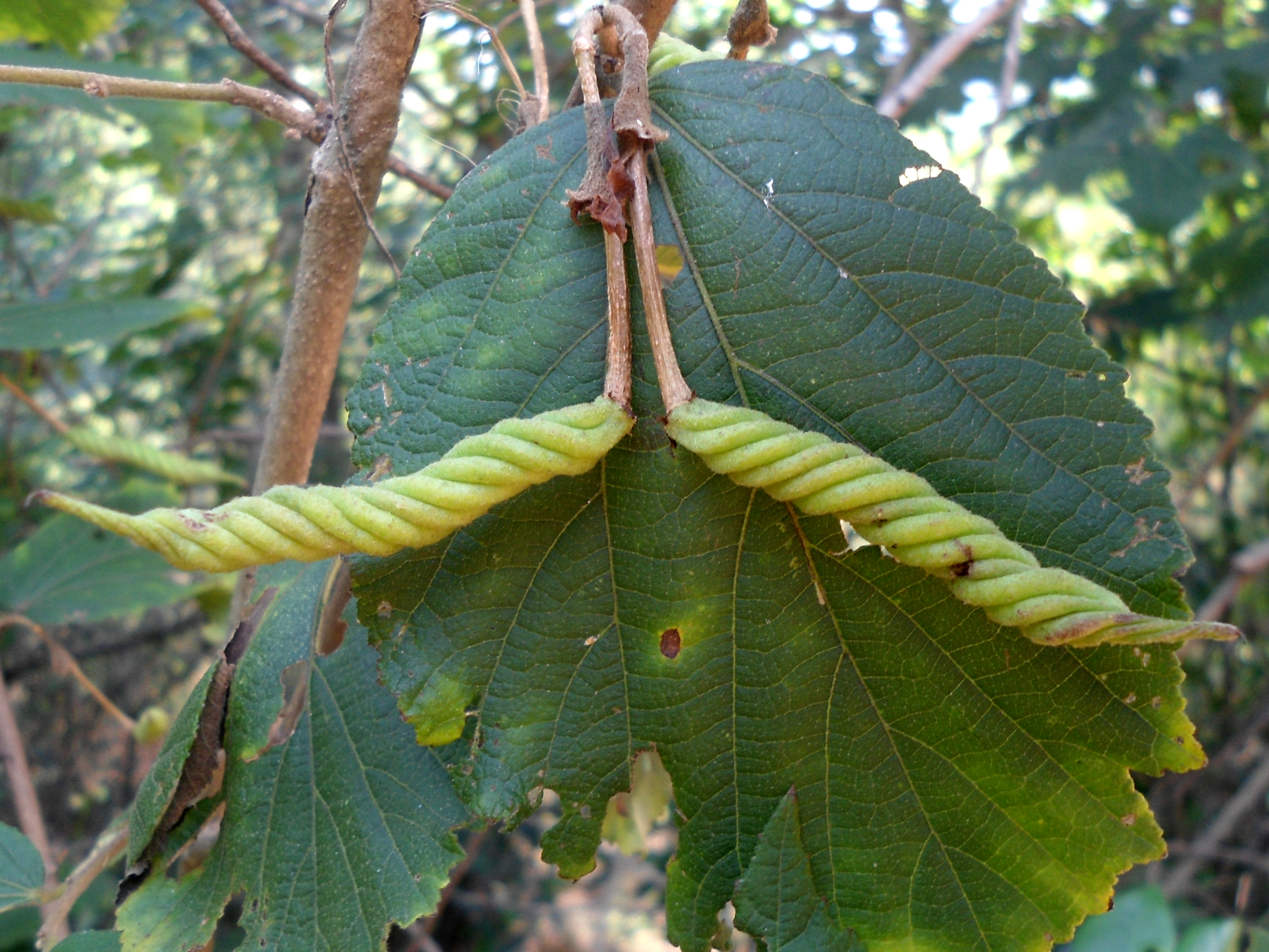
Fruits of H. isora at Kambalakonda Wildlife Sanctuary, Visakhapatnam

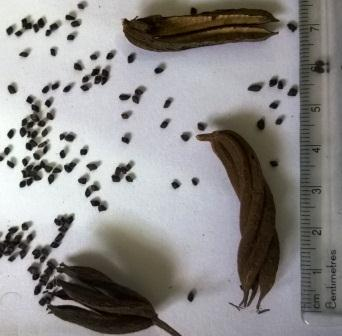
Dried, ruptured fruits of H. isora (with centimetre scale)

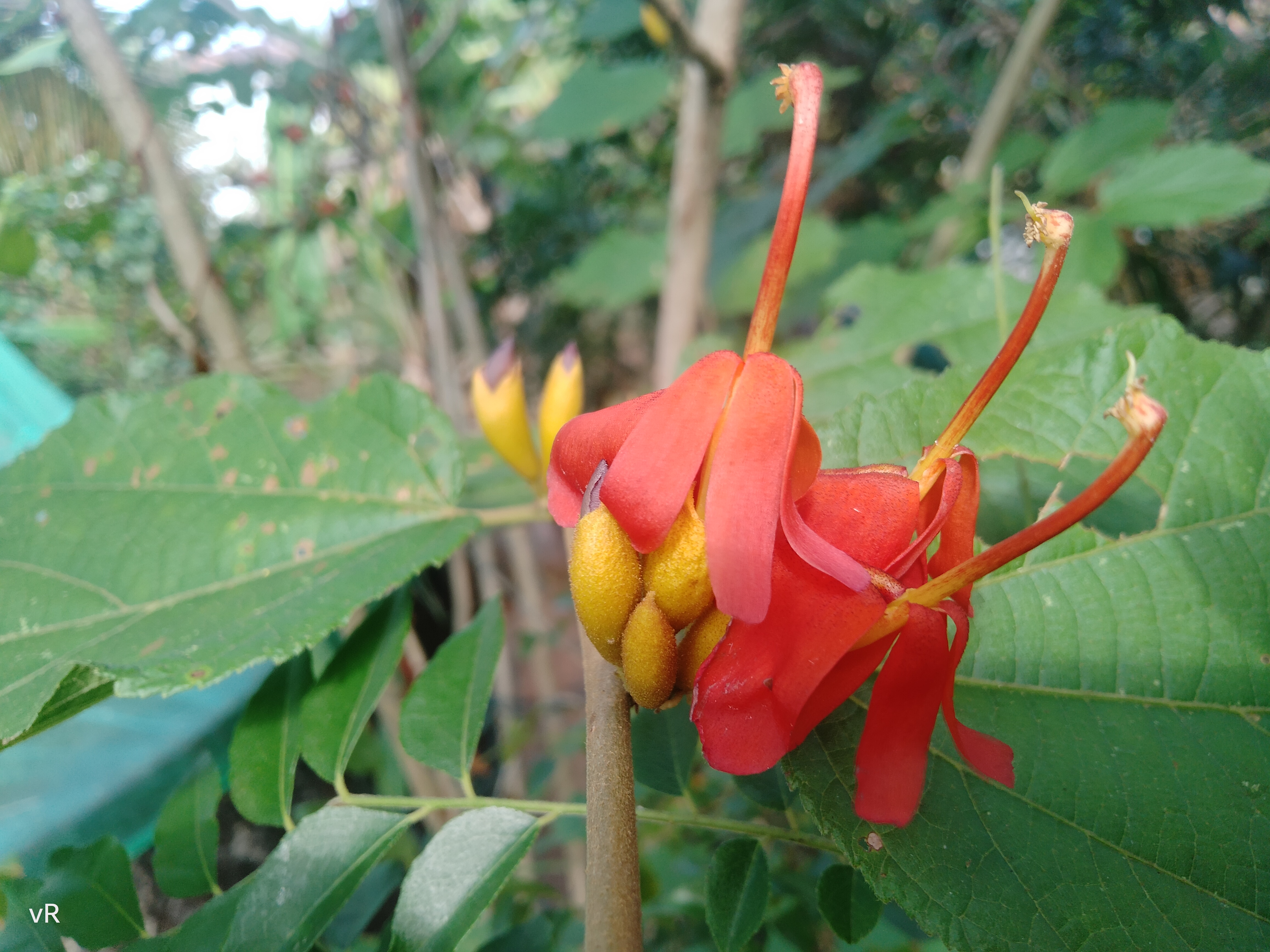
flower

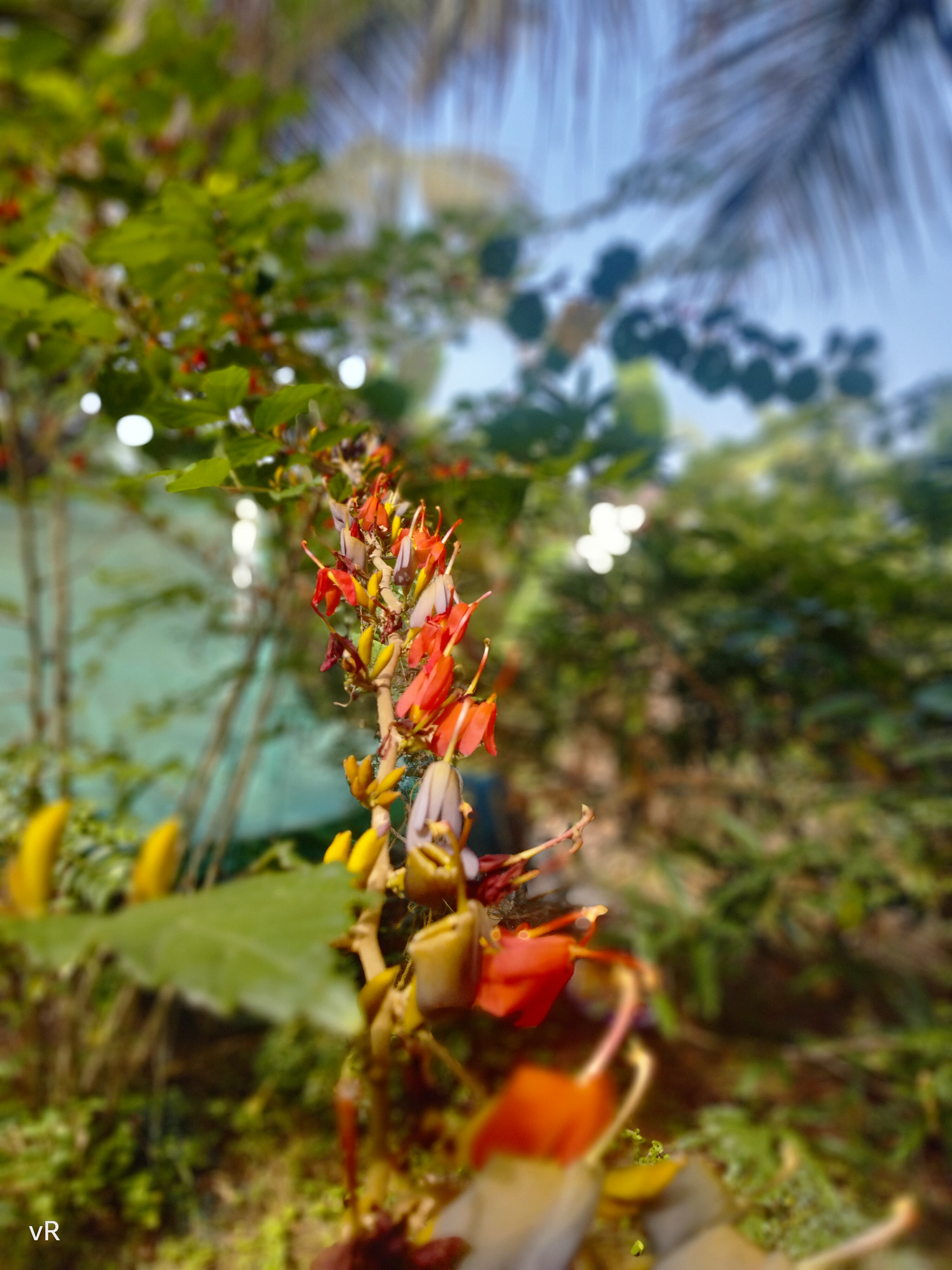
flowers

== Distribution ==
H. isora is a tropical Asian plant. It is found throughout India and Pakistan, Nepal, Myanmar, Thailand, and Sri Lanka. However, it gregariously grows in dry deciduous forests of central and western India on hill slopes. It is also found on the Malay Peninsula, Java, and Australia.

== Economic importance ==
Fruits of H. isora are exported from India to 19 countries, with a 36-month value of US$274,055. At the farm gate local harvesters receive 0.3 US$ per kg, while it can be sold overseas for 2 US$.

== Phytochemistry ==
H. isora is a rich source of antioxidants, carbohydrates, proteins, fibre, calcium, phosphorus, and iron. Active phytoconstituents include gallic acid, caffeic acid, vanillin, and p-coumaric acid. Cucurbitacin b and isocucurbitacin b have been isolated from the roots. Additionally, Satake et al. (1999) isolated rosmarinic acid and their derivatives; isoscutellarein and their derivatives; D-glucopyranosyl isorinic acid with rosmarinic acid; helisterculins A and B; and helisorin.

== Medicinal value ==
The fruits and roots of H. isora are used in traditional medicine systems of Asia, Iraq and South Africa, where they are credited with having value in treatment of a wide variety of conditions, including gastrointestinal disorders, diabetes, cancer, and infections. There appear to have been no scientific investigations of these beliefs. However, laboratory studies have confirmed that both bacteria and cancer cells may survive less well in the presence of extracts of the fruits. Animal studies have shown that extracts of the roots can improve glucose tolerance in diabetic rats.
