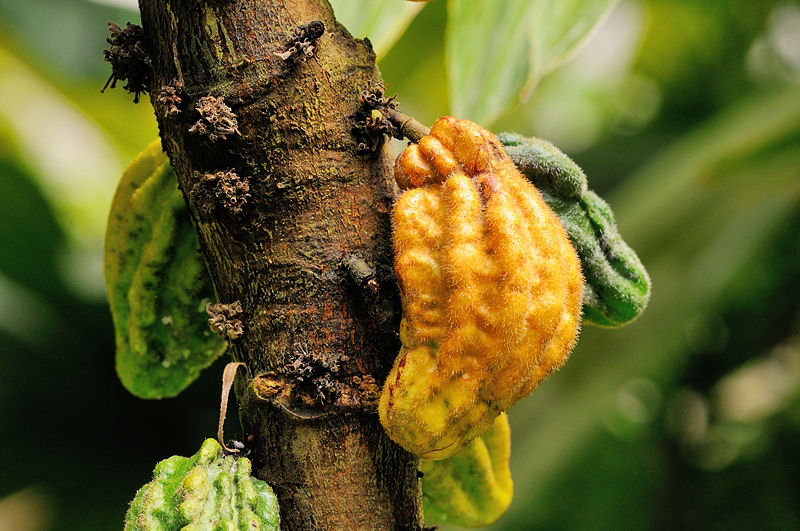

Conservation status
- Critically Endangered (IUCN 3.1)

Scientific classification
- Kingdom: Plantae
- Clade: Tracheophytes
- Clade: Angiosperms
- Clade: Eudicots
- Clade: Rosids
- Order: Malvales
- Family: Malvaceae
- Genus: Theobroma
- Species: T. umbraticum

Binomial name
- Theobroma umbraticum (R.E.Schult.) Colli-Silva

Synonyms
- Herrania umbratica R.E.Schult.

= Theobroma umbraticum =

Species of flowering plant

Theobroma umbraticum is a species of flowering plant in the family Malvaceae. It is a tree endemic to Santander Department of Colombia.
