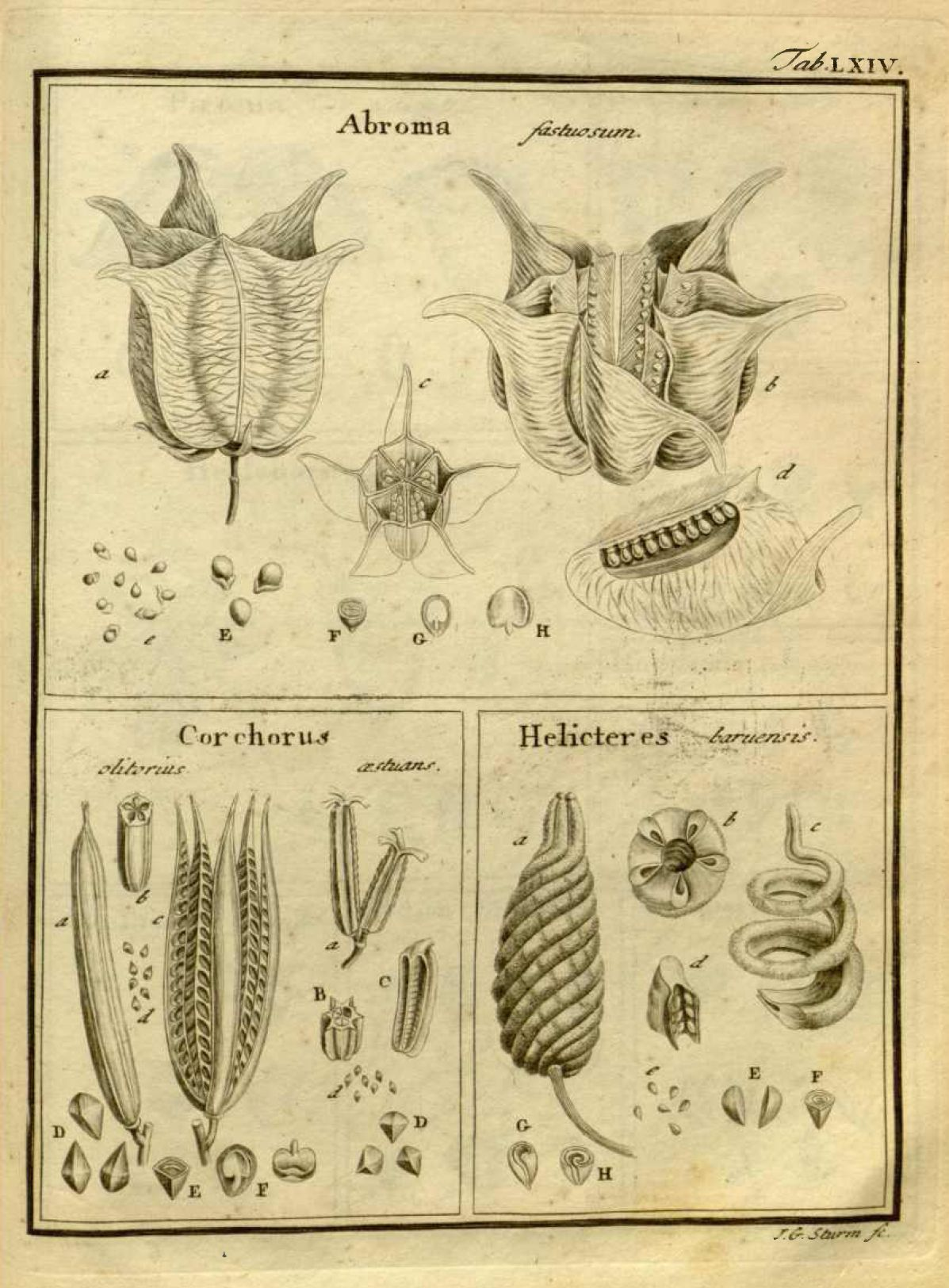

Scientific classification
- Kingdom: Plantae
- Clade: Tracheophytes
- Clade: Angiosperms
- Clade: Eudicots
- Clade: Rosids
- Order: Malvales
- Family: Malvaceae
- Genus: Helicteres
- Species: H. baruensis

Binomial name
- Helicteres baruensis Jacq.

= Helicteres baruensis =

Species of plant

Helicteres baruensis, or the tornillo de Venezuela ("Venezuelan screw") is a species of plant belonging to the family Malvaceae.

== Description ==
It is a shrub that reaches a size of 2 metres (7 ft) in height. Leaves ovate, sometimes asymmetric, 9–16 centimetres (4–6 in) long and 6–10 centimetres (2–4 in) wide, apex acute, base cordate; petiole 1–3 centimetres (0.4–1 in) long. Flowers zygomorphic, oblique, with shiny nectaries on the peduncle; calyx tubular-bell-shaped, 2.5–3 centimetres (0.98–1.2 in) long and 1 centimetre (0.4 in) wide, bilabiate; petals ribbon-like, greenish; androgynophore curved, 8–11 centimetres (3–4 in) long, tomentose. Capsule spiraled, sometimes straight towards the apex, 2.3–4 centimetres (0.9–2 in) long and 1–1.3 centimetres (0.4–0.5 in) wide, grayish.

== Distribution and habitat ==
It is native to the West Indies, where it grows in warm climates, from sea level to 30 metres (100 ft) in altitude, associated with tropical deciduous and subdeciduous forests.

== Properties ==
In Quintana Roo of Mexico, it is used for respiratory ailments, such as cough and asthma.

== Taxonomy ==
'Helicteres baruensis' was described by Nikolaus Joseph von Jacquin and published in Enumeratio Systematica Plantarum, quas in insulis Caribaeis 30. 1760.

Synonymy

- Helicteres altheifolia Benth.
- Helicteres mollis C.Presl
