= Theograndin I =

Names
- IUPAC name 4′,5,7-Trihydroxyflavon-8-yl 3-O-sulfo-β-D-glucopyranosiduronic acid
- Systematic IUPAC name (2S,3R,4S,5R,6S)-6-{[5,7-Dihydroxy-2-(4-hydroxyphenyl)-4-oxo-4H-1-benzopyran-8-yl]oxy}-3,5-dihydroxy-4-(sulfooxy)oxane-2-carboxylic acid

Identifiers
CAS Number	637004-62-7
3D model (JSmol)	Interactive image
ChEMBL	ChEMBL460972
ChemSpider	9332093
PubChem CID	11156985
UNII	H7Z3V79EXC
CompTox Dashboard (EPA)	DTXSID801045348
- InChI: InChI=1S/C21H18O15S/c22-8-3-1-7(2-4-8)12-6-10(24)13-9(23)5-11(25)16(17(13)33-12)34-21-15(27)18(36-37(30,31)32)14(26)19(35-21)20(28)29/h1-6,14-15,18-19,21-23,25-27H,(H,28,29)(H,30,31,32)/t14-,15+,18-,19-,21+/m0/s1 Key: RUJCBFMBNQPWBK-DLSLMLROSA-N; InChI=1/C21H18O15S/c22-8-3-1-7(2-4-8)12-6-10(24)13-9(23)5-11(25)16(17(13)33-12)34-21-15(27)18(36-37(30,31)32)14(26)19(35-21)20(28)29/h1-6,14-15,18-19,21-23,25-27H,(H,28,29)(H,30,31,32)/t14-,15+,18-,19-,21+/m0/s1 Key: RUJCBFMBNQPWBK-DLSLMLROBZ
- SMILES: C1=CC(=CC=C1C2=CC(=O)C3=C(O2)C(=C(C=C3O)O)OC4C(C(C(C(O4)C(=O)O)O)OS(=O)(=O)O)O)O

Properties
Chemical formula	C_{21}H_{18}O_{15}S
Molar mass	542.42 g/mol
- Except where otherwise noted, data are given for materials in their standard state (at 25 °C [77 °F], 100 kPa). Infobox references

Theograndin I is a sulfated flavone glucuronide found in Cupuaçu (Theobroma grandiflorum). It is a glucuronide of isoscutellarein (8-Hydroxyapigenin).
