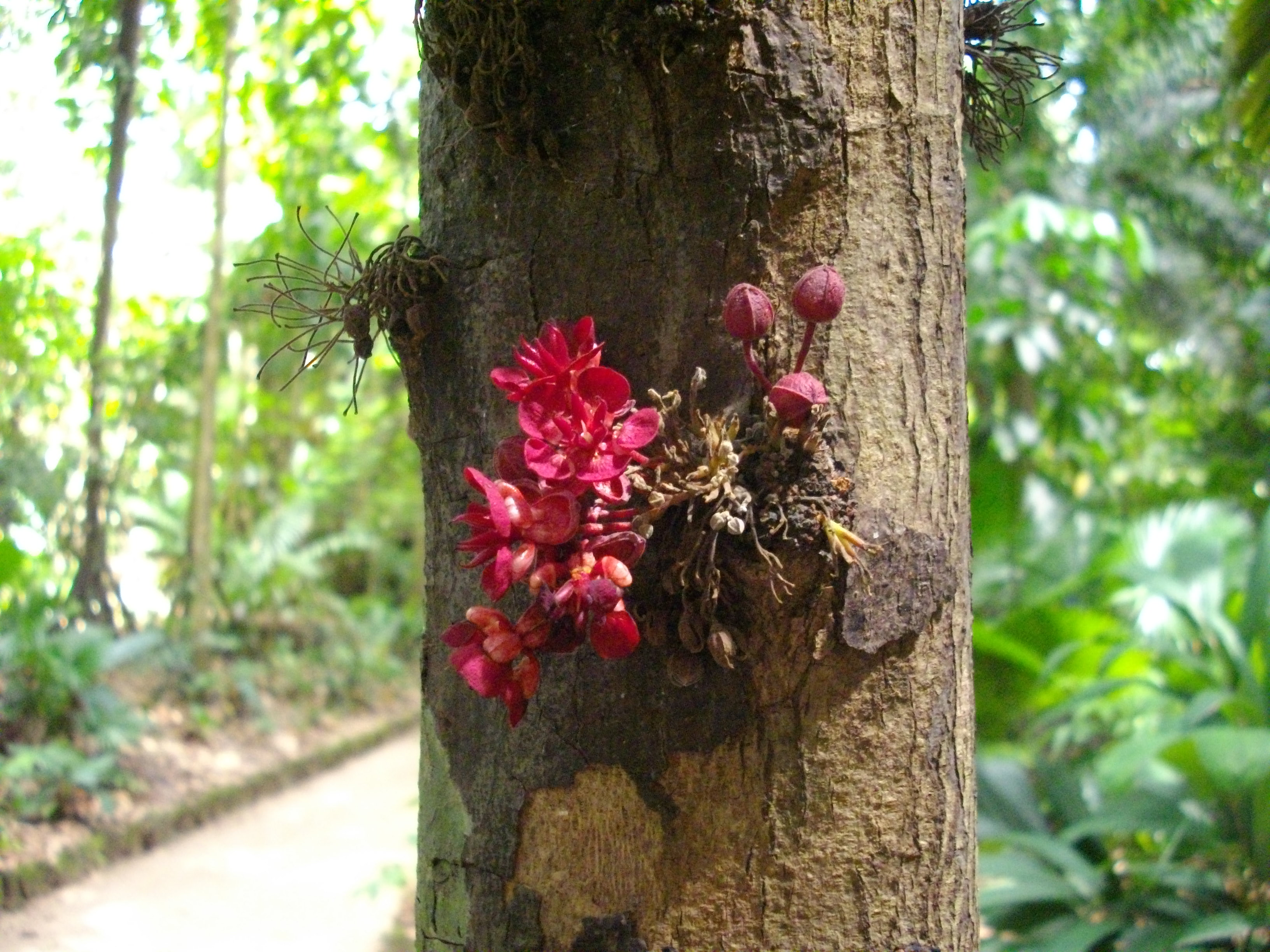
- Flowers of T. speciosum in bud and in bloom

Scientific classification
- Kingdom: Plantae
- Clade: Embryophytes
- Clade: Tracheophytes
- Clade: Angiosperms
- Clade: Eudicots
- Clade: Rosids
- Order: Malvales
- Family: Malvaceae
- Genus: Theobroma
- Species: T. speciosum

Binomial name
- Theobroma speciosum Willd. ex Spreng. (Note: Theobroma speciosum Willd. ex Spreng. is not to be confused with Theobroma speciosum Willd. ex Mart., a synonym of Theobroma grandiflorum (Willd. ex Spreng.) K.Schum., which is a different species of Theobroma.)

Synonyms
- Theobroma quinquenervium Bernoulli; Theobroma speciosum var. coriaceum Huber; Theobroma speciosum var. quinquenervium (Bernoulli) K.Schum.; Theobroma subincanum Spruce ex Sagot

= Theobroma speciosum =

Species of flowering plant

Theobroma speciosum is an evergreen tree species of flowering plant in the mallow family native to northern South America. It is the 35th most abundant species of tree in the Amazon rainforest.

== Name ==
=== Specific epithet ===
The specific epithet 'speciosum' is used to indicate that a plant is aesthetically pleasing; it is a neuter form of 'speciosus', which is Latin for 'beautiful'.

=== Common names ===
Theobroma speciosum has a number of common names:

- In Bolivia it is called chocolatillo
- In Brazil it is called cacauí or cacau-de-macaco
- In Peru it is called cacaoy, cacaoíllo, cacau-rana, cacao biaro, cupuyh or cacao sacha

== Description ==
Theobroma speciosum is an evergreen tree that grows up to 15 m (49 ft) tall. The trunk is straight, with plagiotropic (horizontally growing) side branches. The canopy is small. Its leaves are simple, and have a coriaceous (leather-like) surface with trichomes (hairs). Leaf arrangement is distichous (leaves alternate between one side of the stem and the other). Flowers are red, and grow on the trunk in dense clusters. Fruits are 10 cm (3.9 in) in length, and comprise approximately 20 seeds surrounded by a white flesh, which in turn is surrounded by a capsule.

== Distribution ==
Theobroma speciosum is native to:

- Bolivia
- Brazil, where it has been recorded as present in the following states:
  - Acre
  - Amapá
  - Amazonas
  - Maranhão
  - Mato Grosso
  - Pará
  - Rondônia
- Peru
- Venezuela

== Ecology ==
The fruit of T. speciosum is a food source for primates and rodents. Its flowers are pollinated by flying insects.

== Uses ==
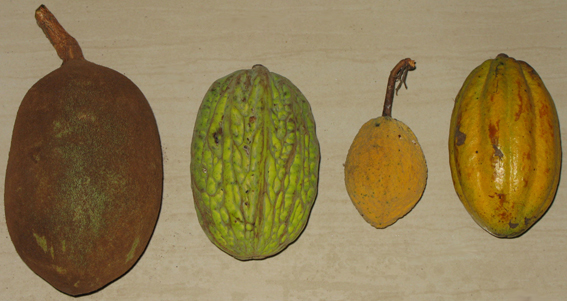
The fruit of T. speciosum is the third from the left.

=== Food ===
The flesh of the fruit is eaten by the Ka'apor and Tacana peoples. The seeds are used to make chocolate, and could also be used to make cocoa butter substitutes.

The flowers are edible, and contain high concentrations of antioxidants.

=== Hygiene ===
The fruit capsules can be used to make soap and deodorant.

=== Genetic resource ===
As a crop wild relative, T. speciosum could be used as a source of genetic variability for T. cacao, which is widely cultivated for its cocoa beans.

=== Ornamental ===
T. speciosum is occasionally grown in gardens as an ornamental plant.

== Diseases ==
Colletotrichum luxificum, a species of pathogenic fungus, can cause witch's broom disease in Theobroma speciosum.
