= Theobroma laciniifolium =

Conservation status
- Least Concern (IUCN 3.1)

Scientific classification
- Kingdom: Plantae
- Clade: Tracheophytes
- Clade: Angiosperms
- Clade: Eudicots
- Clade: Rosids
- Order: Malvales
- Family: Malvaceae
- Genus: Theobroma
- Species: T. laciniifolium

Binomial name
- Theobroma laciniifolium (Goudot ex Triana & Planch.) De Wild.

Synonyms
- Herrania laciniifolia Goudot ex Triana & Planch.

Species of flowering plant

Theobroma laciniifolium is a species of flowering plant in the family Malvaceae. It is a shrub or tree endemic to Colombia.
