= Theobroma balaense =

Conservation status
- Endangered (IUCN 3.1)

Scientific classification
- Kingdom: Plantae
- Clade: Tracheophytes
- Clade: Angiosperms
- Clade: Eudicots
- Clade: Rosids
- Order: Malvales
- Family: Malvaceae
- Genus: Theobroma
- Species: T. balaense

Binomial name
- Theobroma balaense (H.Preuss) De Wild.

Synonyms
- Herrania balaensis H.Preuss; Herrania pulcherrima var. pacifica R.E.Schult.

Species of flowering plant

Theobroma balaense is a species of flowering plant in the family Malvaceae. It native to Colombia and Ecuador. Its natural habitat is subtropical or tropical moist lowland forests; it is fragmented due to colonization, mining, and deforestation.
