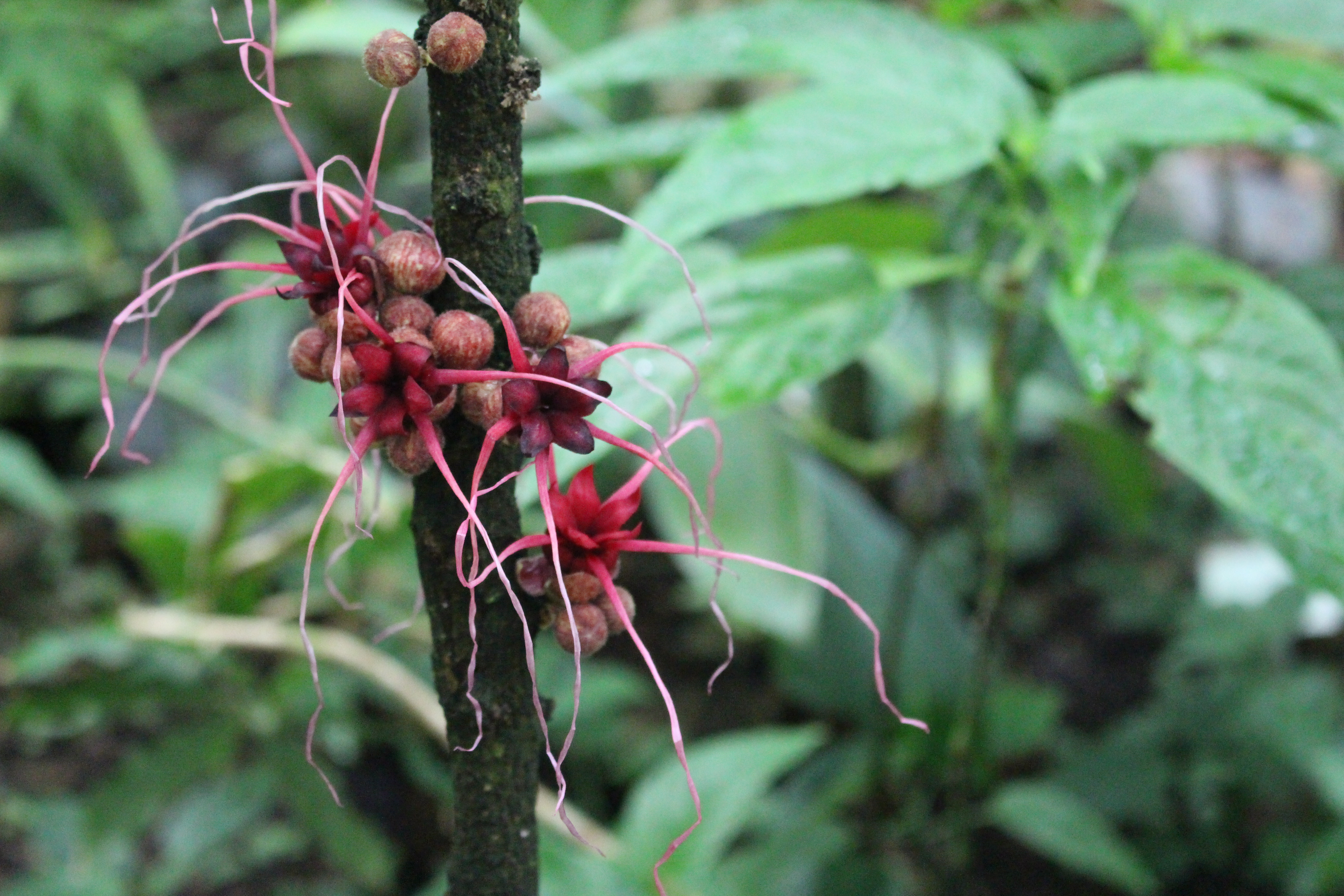
- Flowers

Scientific classification
- Kingdom: Plantae
- Clade: Tracheophytes
- Clade: Angiosperms
- Clade: Eudicots
- Clade: Rosids
- Order: Malvales
- Family: Malvaceae
- Genus: Theobroma
- Species: T. mariae

Binomial name
- Theobroma mariae (Mart.) K.Schum.

Synonyms
- Abroma mariae Mart. (1841) (basionym); Herrania mariae (Mart.) Goudot; Herrania mariae var. mariae; Herrania mariae var. putumayonis R.E.Schult.

= Theobroma mariae =

Species of flowering plant

Theobroma mariae is a species of flowering plant in the family Malvaceae. It is native to Colombia, Ecuador, Peru and northern Brazil in tropical South America. The fruits are locally used as food.
