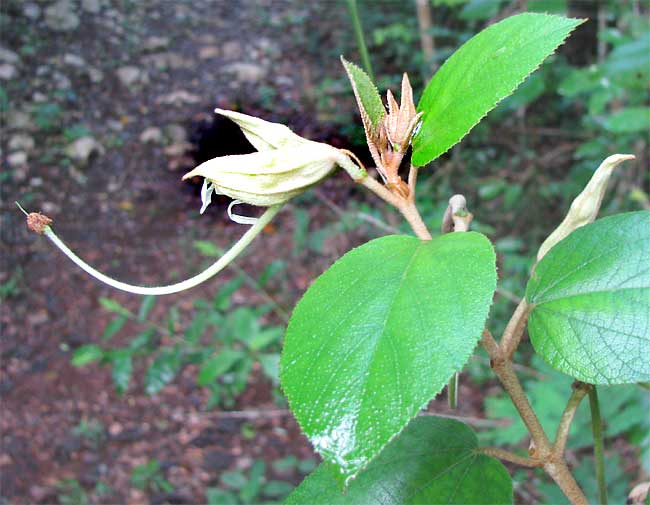
- The flowers of a plant from the genus Helicteres

Scientific classification
- Kingdom: Plantae
- Clade: Tracheophytes
- Clade: Angiosperms
- Clade: Eudicots
- Clade: Rosids
- Order: Malvales
- Family: Malvaceae
- Subfamily: Helicteroideae
- Tribe: Helictereae
- Genus: Helicteres; L.

Species
- See text

Synonyms
- Alicteres Neck.; Anisora Raf.; Camaion Raf.; Hypophyllanthus Regel; Isora Mill.; Methorium Schott & Endl.; Nisoralis Raf.; Opsopaea Neck.; Orthothecium Schott & Endl.; Oudemansia Miq.; Ozoxeta Raf.

= Helicteres =

Genus of flowering plants

Helicteres is a genus of flowering plants in the family Malvaceae. Its range is from tropical and sub-tropical Asia through to northern Australia, and also Mexico through to the northern half of South America.

== Species ==
As of July 2020 Plants of the World Online recognises the following 69 species in this genus:

- Helicteres andersonii Cristóbal
- Helicteres angustifolia L.
- Helicteres aspera A.St.-Hil. & Naudin
- Helicteres baruensis Jacq.
- Helicteres biflexa Cristóbal
- Helicteres binhthuanensis V.S.Dang
- Helicteres brevispira A.Juss.
- Helicteres calcicola Alain
- Helicteres cana (Schott & Endl.) Benth.
- Helicteres carthagenensis Jacq.
- Helicteres cidii Cristóbal
- Helicteres corylifolia Nees & Mart.
- Helicteres cuneata K.Schum.
- Helicteres daknongensis V.S.Dang & D.T.Bui
- Helicteres darwinensis Cowie
- Helicteres denticulenta Cristóbal
- Helicteres eichleri K.Schum.
- Helicteres eitenii Leane
- Helicteres elliptica Tardieu
- Helicteres elongata Wall. ex Mast.
- Helicteres flagellaris (Benth.) Cowie
- Helicteres gardneriana A.St.-Hil. & Naudin
- Helicteres geoffrayi Gagnep.
- Helicteres glabriuscula Wall. ex Mast.
- Helicteres guazumifolia Kunth
- Helicteres heptandra L.B.Sm.
- Helicteres hirsuta Lour.
- Helicteres integerrima Korth.
- Helicteres integrifolia (F.Muell.) Cowie
- Helicteres isora L.
- Helicteres jamaicensis Jacq.
- Helicteres javensis Blume
- Helicteres kombolgiana Cowie
- Helicteres krapovickasii Cristóbal
- Helicteres laciniosa Cristóbal
- Helicteres lanata (Teijsm. & Binn.) Kurz
- Helicteres lanceolata A.DC.
- Helicteres lenta Mart.
- Helicteres lhotzkyana (Schott & Endl.) K.Schum.
- Helicteres longepedunculata K.Schum.
- Helicteres macropetala A.Juss.
- Helicteres macrothrix Cowie
- Helicteres microcarpa Span.
- Helicteres muscosa Mart.
- Helicteres obtusa Wall. ex Kurz
- Helicteres ovata Lam.
- Helicteres pegueroi Mart.Gord. & Clase
- Helicteres pentandra L.
- Helicteres pilgeri R.E.Fr.
- Helicteres pintonis Cristóbal
- Helicteres plebeia Kurz
- Helicteres poilanei Tardieu
- Helicteres procumbens (Benth.) Cowie
- Helicteres prostrata S.Y.Liu
- Helicteres rekoi Standl.
- Helicteres rhynchocarpa W.Fitzg.
- Helicteres sacarolha A.Juss.
- Helicteres semiglabra (F.Muell.) F.Muell. ex F.M.Bailey
- Helicteres semitriloba Bertero ex DC.
- Helicteres serpens Cowie
- Helicteres sphaerotheca Cowie
- Helicteres tenuipila Cowie
- Helicteres trapezifolia A.Rich.
- Helicteres urupaensis Leane
- Helicteres vallsii Cristóbal
- Helicteres vegae Cristóbal
- Helicteres velutina K.Schum.
- Helicteres viscida Blume
- Helicteres vuarame Mart.

Note: Helicteres apetala Jacq. is a synonym of Sterculia apetala (Jacq.) H.Karst.

== Gallery ==
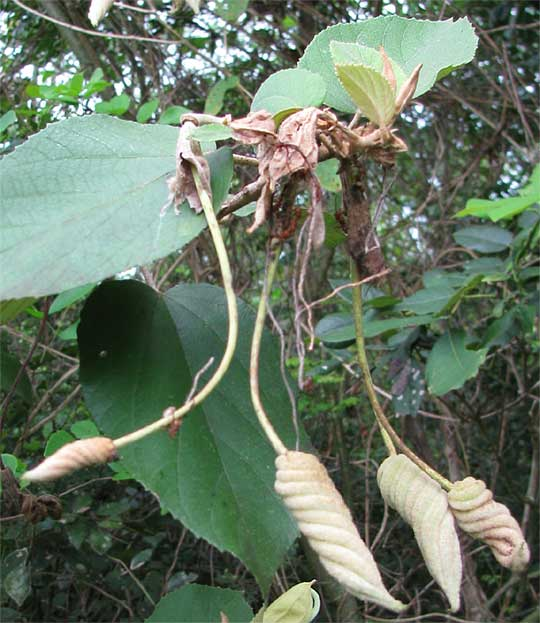

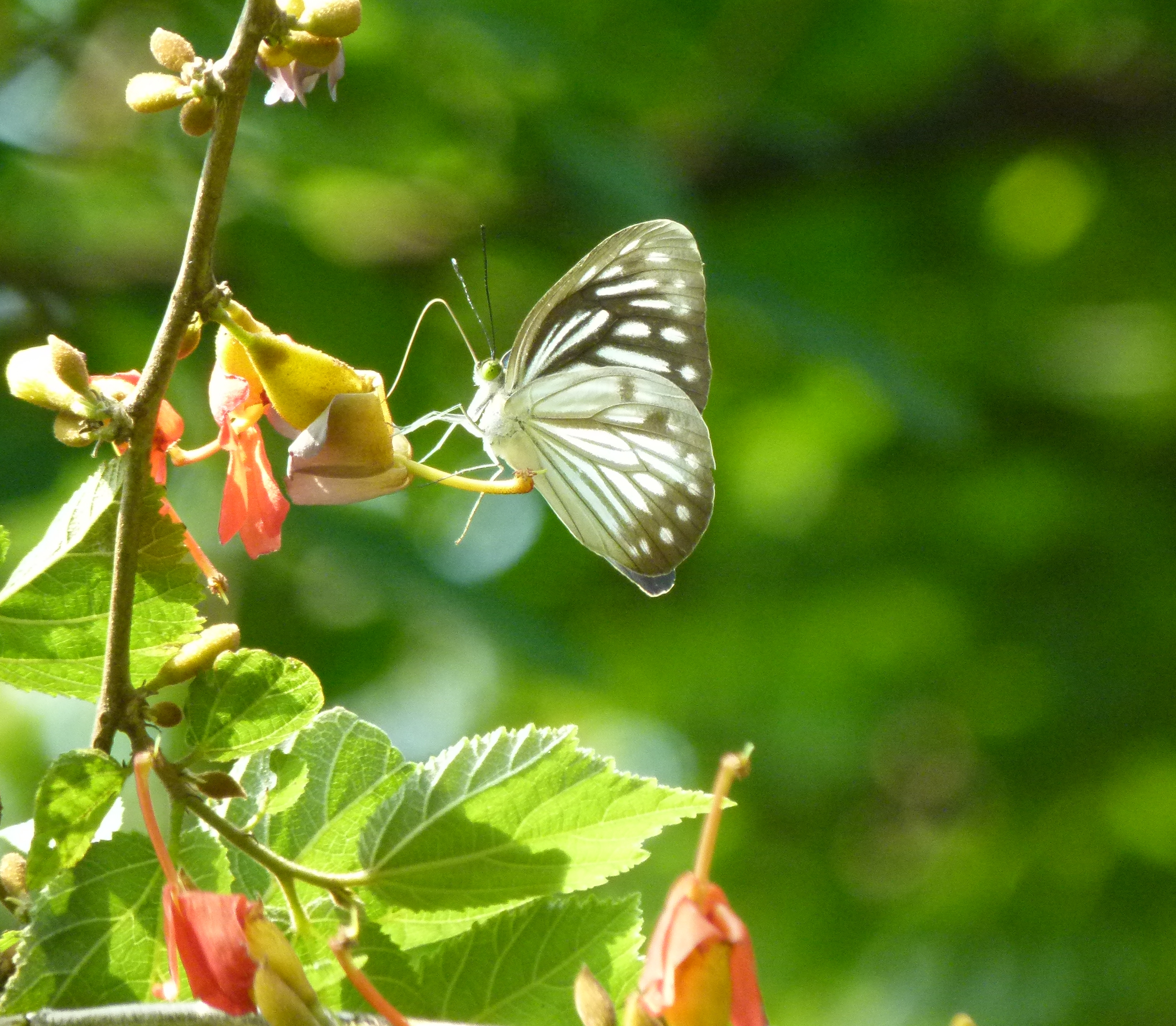

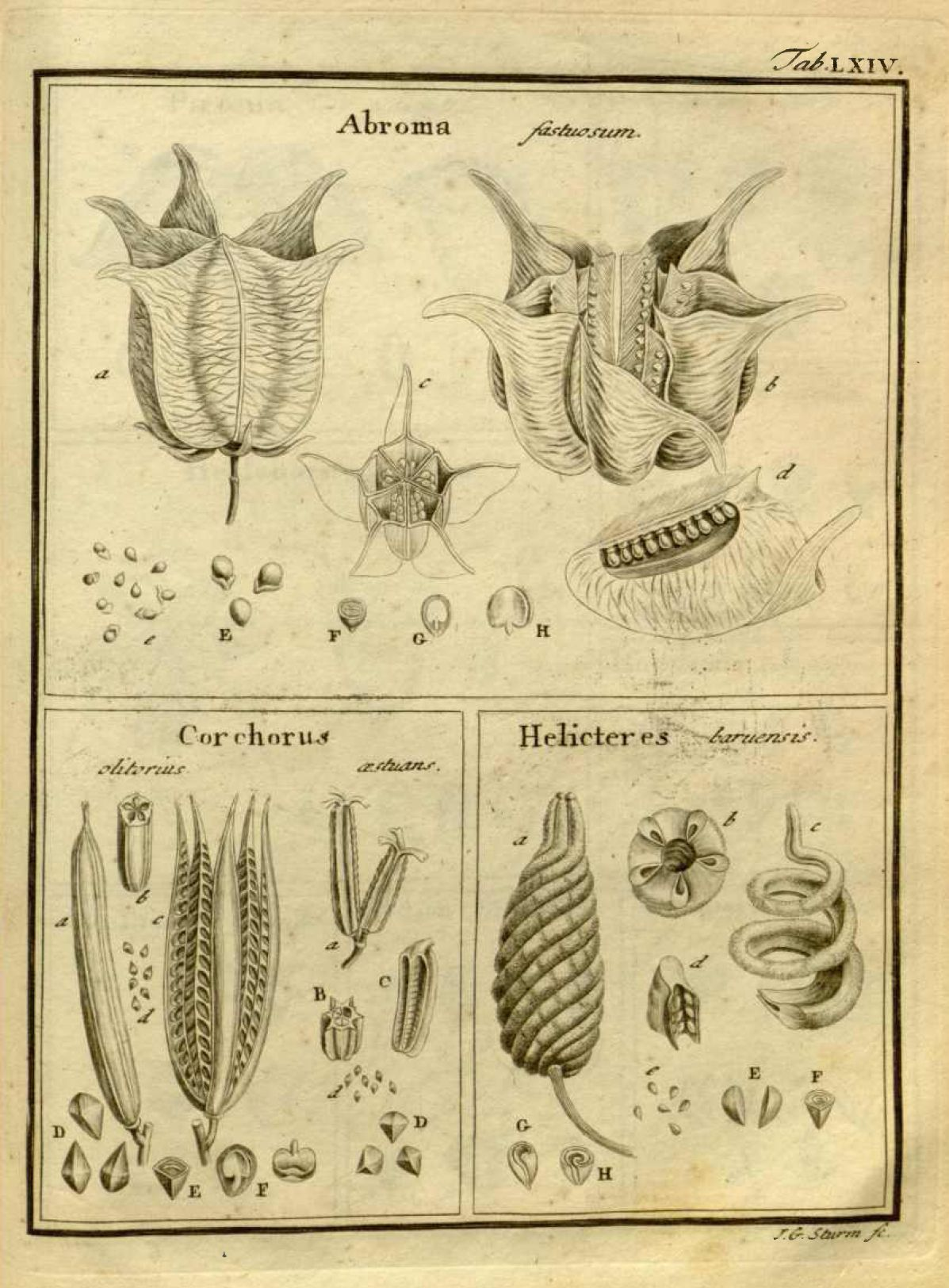

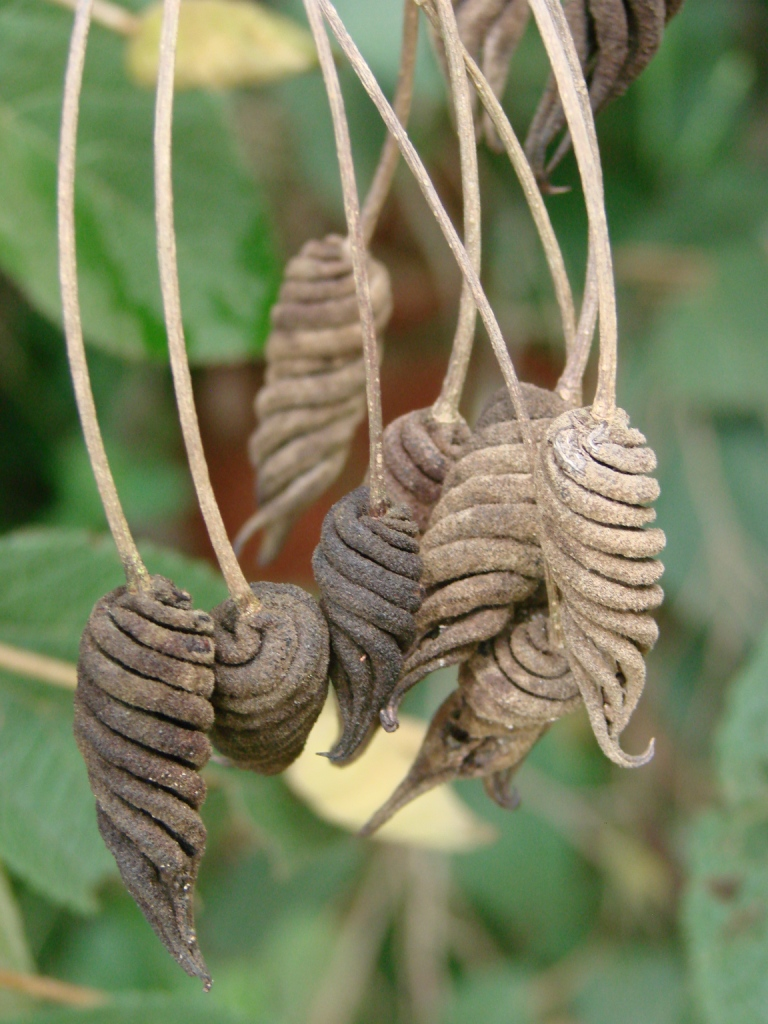

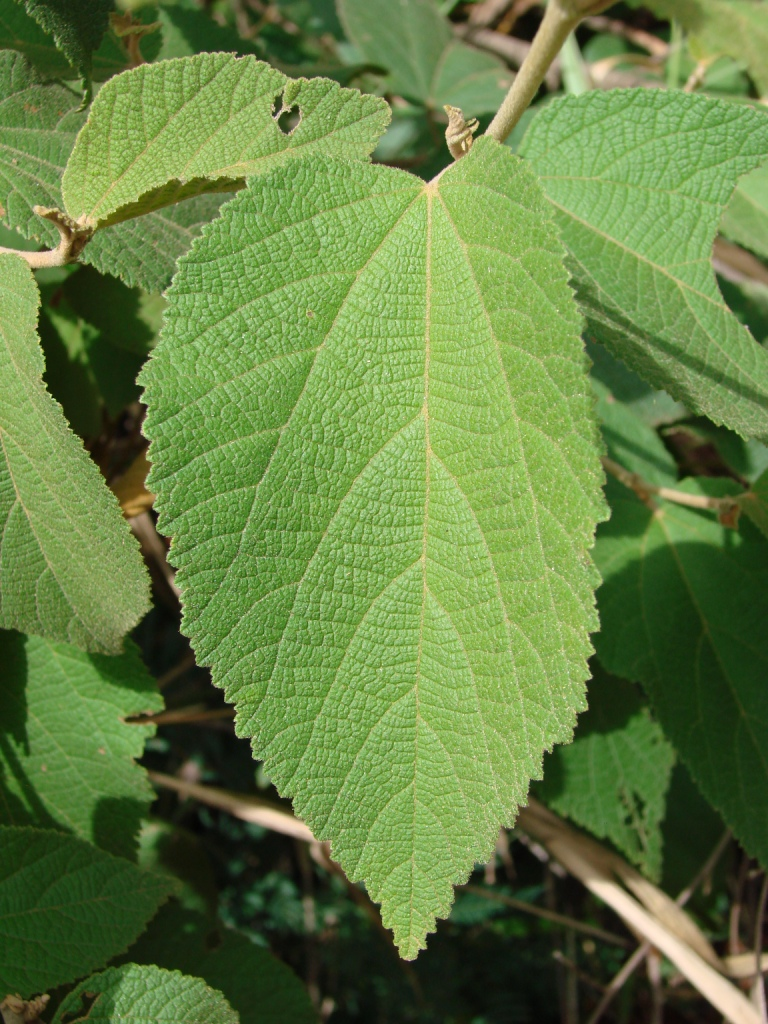

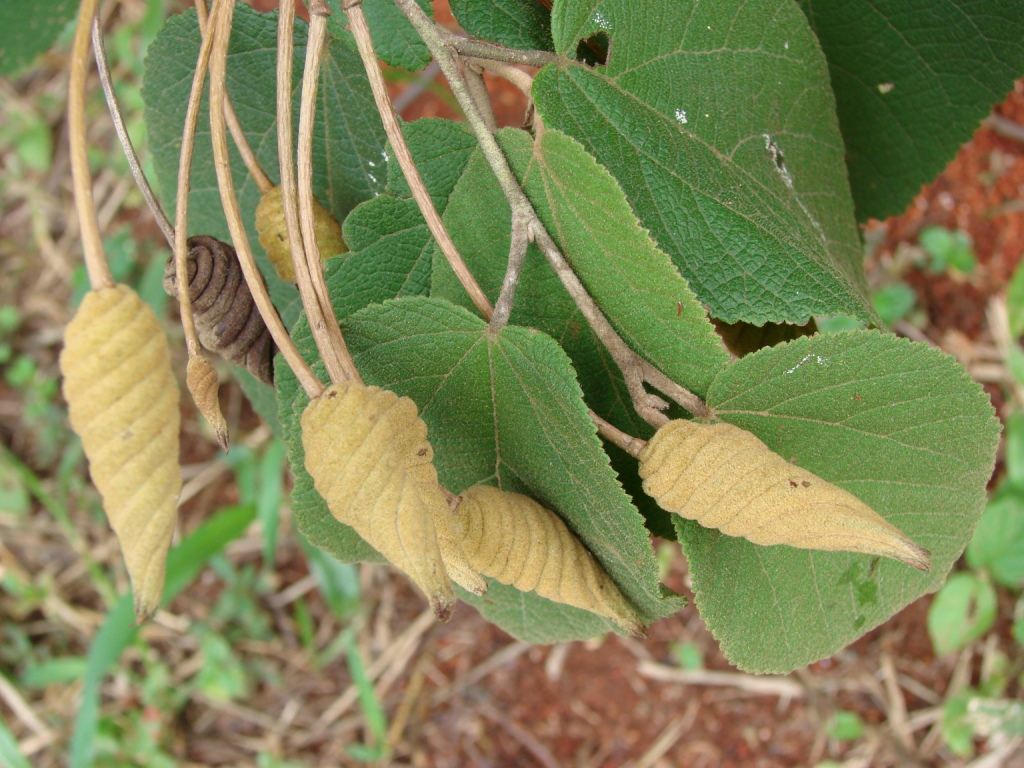

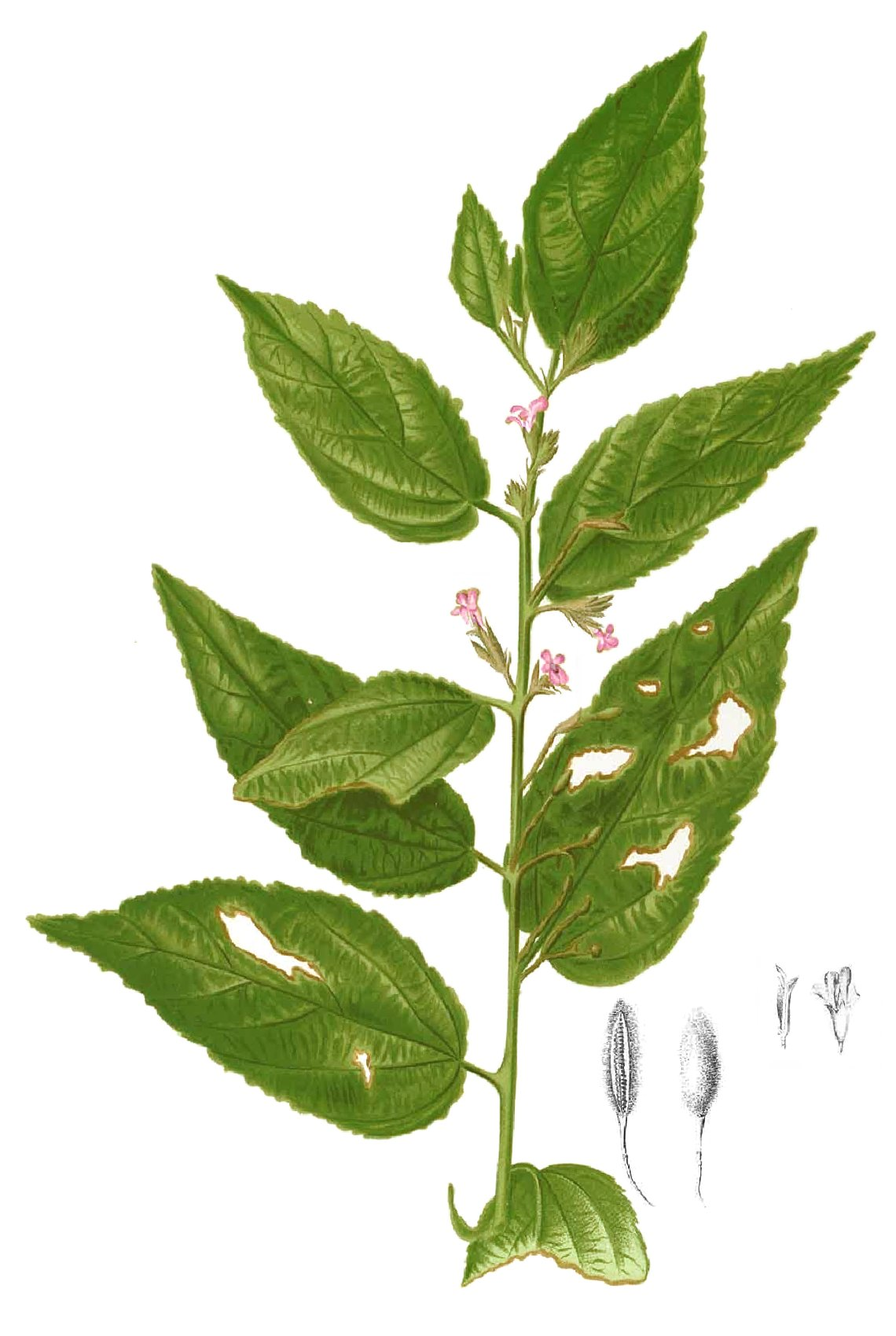
H. hirsuta
