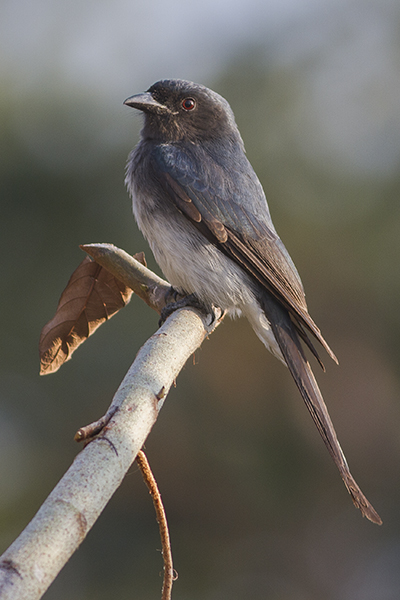
- Dicrurus caerulescens caerulescens from Ghatgarh, Uttarakhand, India

Conservation status
- Least Concern (IUCN 3.1)

Scientific classification
- Kingdom: Animalia
- Phylum: Chordata
- Class: Aves
- Order: Passeriformes
- Family: Dicruridae
- Genus: Dicrurus
- Species: D. caerulescens

Binomial name
- Dicrurus caerulescens (Linnaeus, 1758)

Subspecies
- D. c. caerulescens D. c. leucopygialis Blyth, 1846; D. c. insularis Sharpe, 1877

Synonyms
- Lanius caerulescens Linnaeus, 1758; Balicassius caerulescens (Linnaeus, 1758); Buchanga caerulescens (Linnaeus, 1758)

= White-bellied drongo =

Species of bird

The white-bellied drongo (Dicrurus caerulescens) is a species of drongo found across the Indian Subcontinent. Like other members of the family Dicruridae, they are insectivorous and mainly black in colour, but with a white belly and vent. Young birds are, however, all black and may be confused with the black drongo, which is smaller and more compact in appearance. The subspecies found in Sri Lanka has white restricted to the vent.

== Taxonomy ==
In 1747 the English naturalist George Edwards included an illustration and a description of the white-bellied drongo in the second volume of his A Natural History of Uncommon Birds. He used the English name "The Fork- tail'd Indian Butcher-Bird". Edwards based his hand-coloured etching on a specimen that had been sent from Bengal to the silk-pattern designer Joseph Dandridge in London. When in 1758 the Swedish naturalist Carl Linnaeus updated his Systema Naturae for the tenth edition, he placed the white-bellied drongo with the shrikes in the genus Lanius. Linnaeus included a brief description, coined the binomial name Lanius caerulescens and cited Edwards' work. The specific epithet caerulescens is Latin meaning "bluish". The white-bellied drongo is now placed with the other drongos in the genus Dicrurus that was introduced in 1816 by the French ornithologist Louis Pierre Vieillot.

Three subspecies are recognised:

- D. c. caerulescens (Linnaeus, 1758) – south Nepal to west, south India
- D. c. insularis (Sharpe, 1877) – north Sri Lanka
- D. c. leucopygialis Blyth, 1846 – south Sri Lanka

== Description ==
This drongo is black without any glossy feathers on the upperside and greyish on the throat and breast, while the belly and vent are entirely white in the Indian form which is the nominate subspecies. The fork of the tail is less deep than in the black drongo which is often seen in the same habitats. Young black drongos can have a lot of white on the underside but it is usually scaly in appearance. The Sri Lankan forms insularis of the northern dry zone and leucopygialis of the southern wet zone have the white restricted to the vent. Birds that are less than a year old lack the white on the underside but are browner above and greyish below. Males have a very slightly shorter tail on average than females.

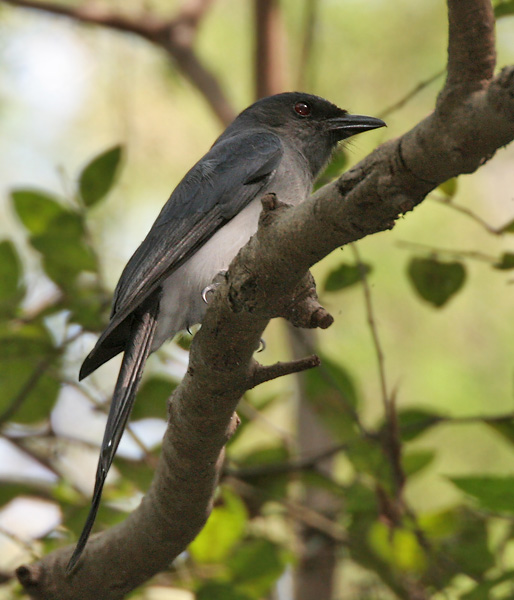
Nominate subspecies (Sindhrot, Gujarat)

The size of the birds varies clinally with northern birds larger. The extent of white on the underside also declines with size although there is a lot of local variation. The Sri Lankan forms leucopygialis and insularis are darker than the Indian form and there is some intergradation within the Sri Lankan forms. The species is believed to be closely related to Dicrurus leucophaeus but has not been confirmed with molecular sequence studies.

Both the white-bellied drongo and the black drongo share a diploid chromosome number of 68.

== Distribution and habitat ==
The white-bellied drongo is a resident breeder in India and Sri Lanka. This species is usually found in dry scrub or open forests. The distribution is restricted to peninsular India south of the Himalayas and to the west of the Gangetic delta bounded on the west by the Aravallis.

== Behaviour and ecology ==
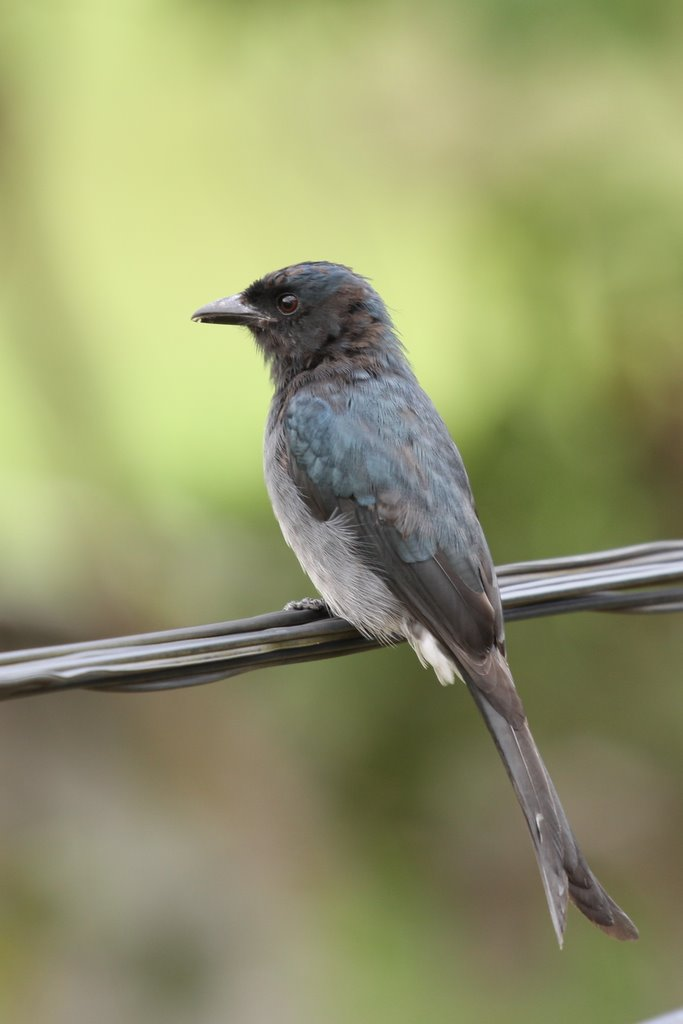
D. c. leucopygialis (Colombo, Sri Lanka)

Birds are often seen singly or in groups of up to three individuals, sometimes joining mixed-species foraging flocks. They perch upright close to the tops of trees and capture insects in the air with short aerobatic sallies. Larger insects may be captured using their claws. The song of this drongo is a series of staccato notes interspersed with clear notes and may include mimicry of other bird calls.

The breeding season is from February to July. The cup nest is similar to that of the black drongo but is usually made up of more twigs and is well lined with grass. Two to four eggs, pale salmon coloured with reddish blotches on the broad end, are laid in the nest which may be 20 to 30 feet high in the fork of a tree. These are aggressive at the nest and will attack potential threats much larger than themselves. When mobbing they have been observed to imitate the alarm calls of squirrels or the mewing of a cat and is known to join to mixed-species foraging flocks.

Although primarily insectivorous they are opportunistic and are known to prey on small birds. Like other drongos, they use their feet while handling their prey. They have been known to take insects attracted to artificial lights late at dusk. They also visit large flowers for nectar, particularly Bombax, Erythrina and may pollinate species such as Helicteres isora. The bird louse Philopterus kalkalichi whose type host is the black drongo has also been found on white-bellied drongos.

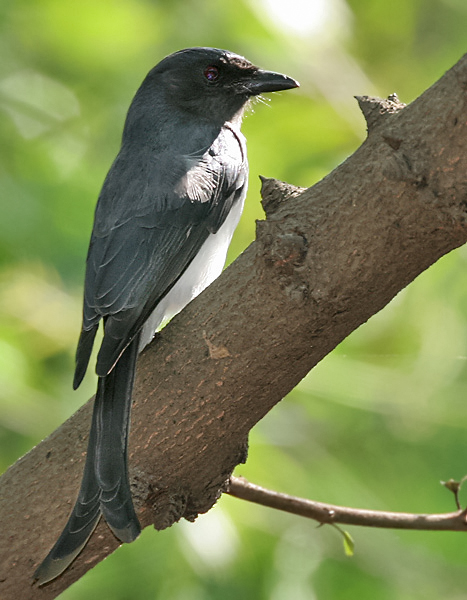
Nominate form (Sindhrot, Gujarat)

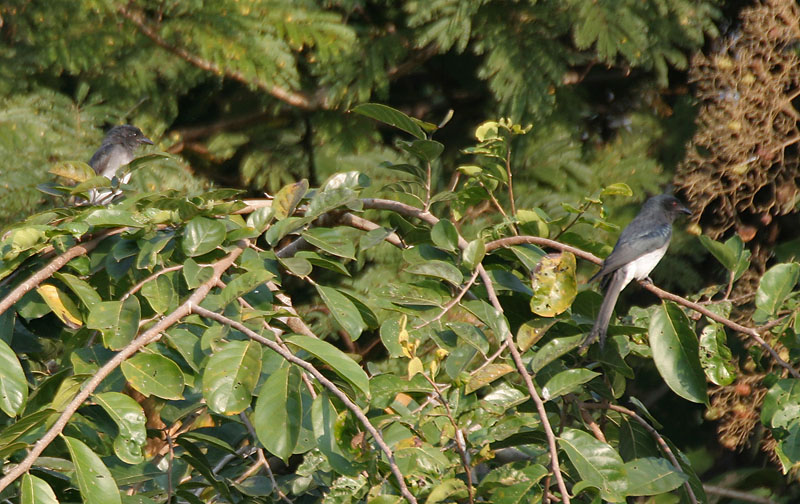
Pair of D. c. caerulescens (Kawal Wildlife Sanctuary)

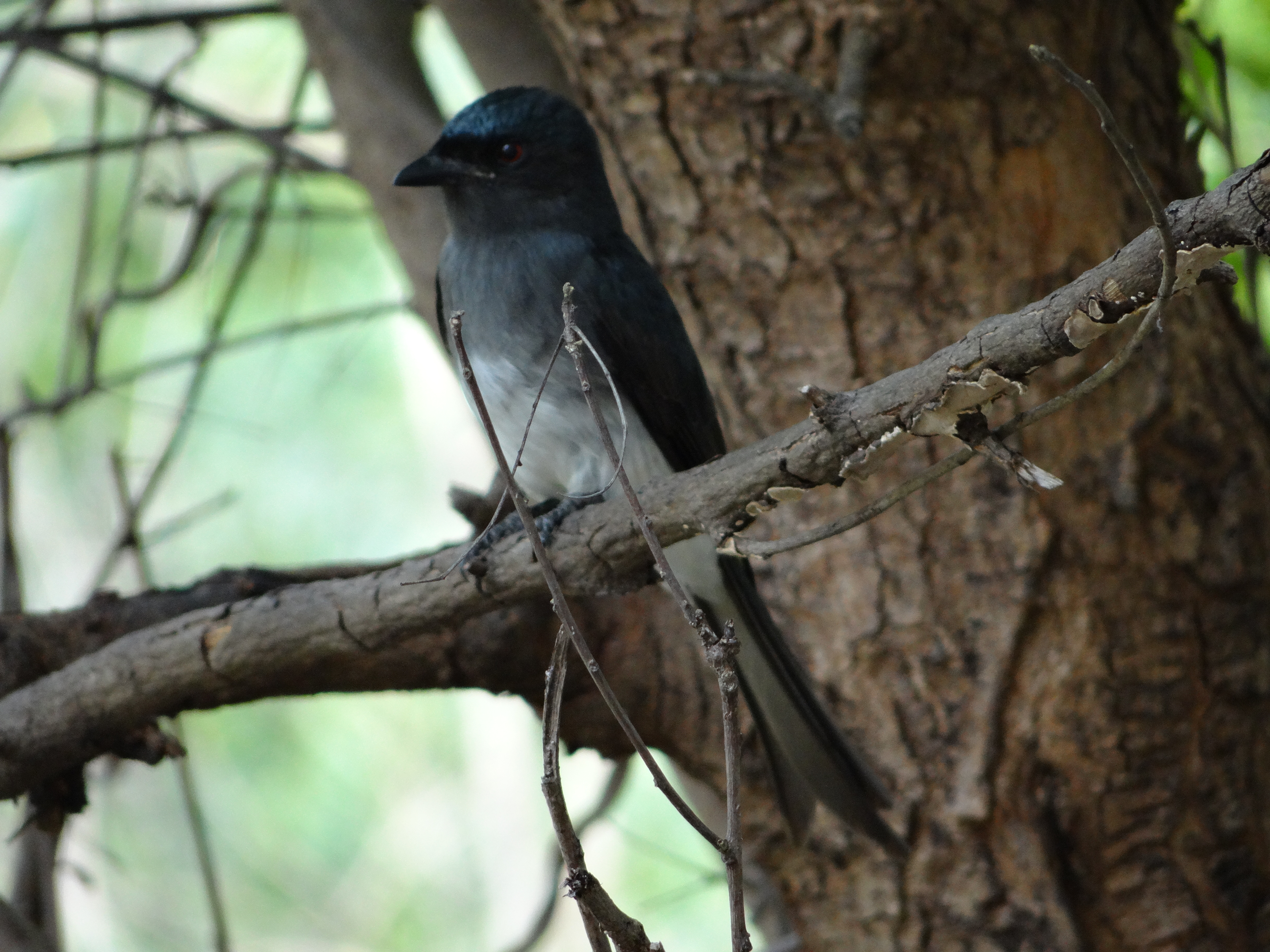
White-Bellied Drongo, (Perundurai)
