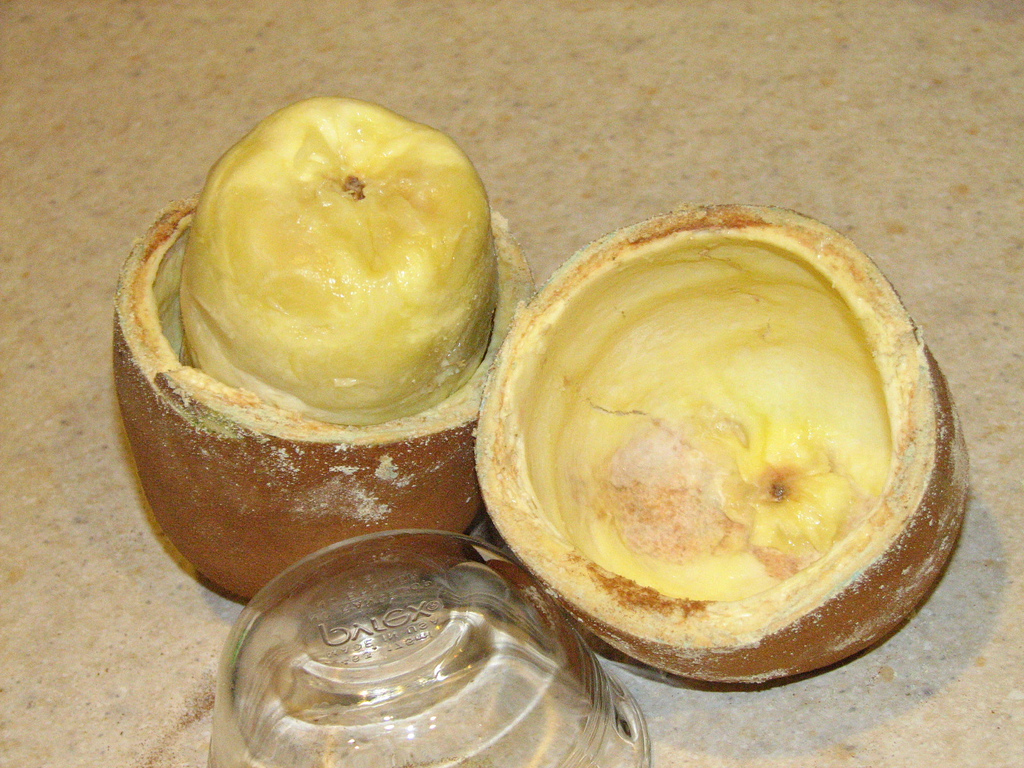

Conservation status
- Least Concern (IUCN 3.1)

Scientific classification
- Kingdom: Plantae
- Clade: Tracheophytes
- Clade: Angiosperms
- Clade: Eudicots
- Clade: Rosids
- Order: Malvales
- Family: Malvaceae
- Genus: Theobroma
- Species: T. grandiflorum

Binomial name
- Theobroma grandiflorum (Willd. ex Spreng.) K.Schum.

= Theobroma grandiflorum =

Cupuaçu

Species of tree

Theobroma grandiflorum, commonly known as cupuaçu, also spelled cupuassu, cupuazú, cupu assu, or copoazu, is a tropical rainforest tree related to cacao. Native and common throughout the Amazon basin, it is naturally cultivated in the jungles of northern Brazil, with the largest production in Pará, Amazonas and Amapá, Colombia, Bolivia and Peru. The pulp of the cupuaçu fruit is consumed throughout Central and South America, especially in the northern states of Brazil, and is used to make ice creams, snack bars, and other products.

== Description ==
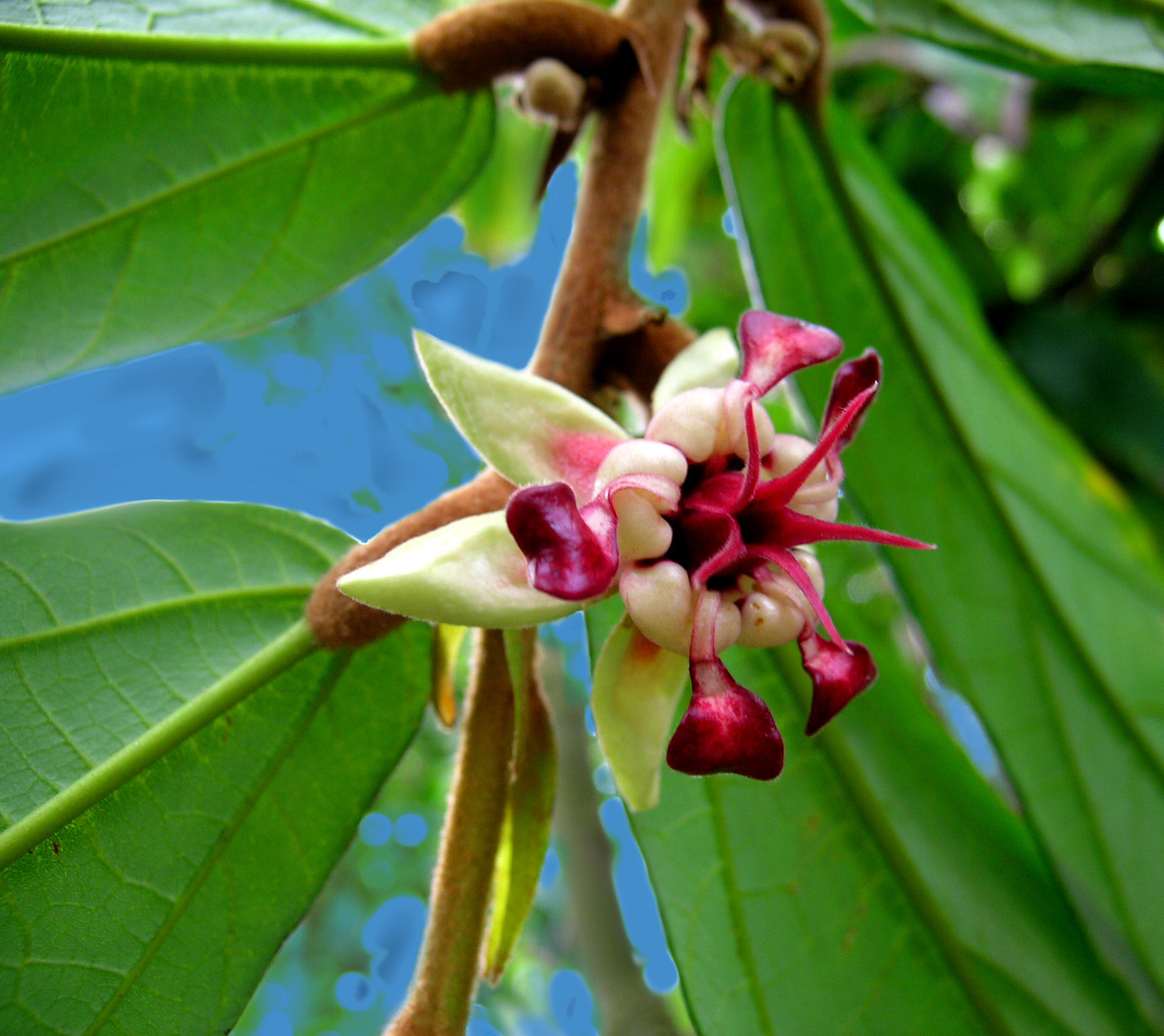
Cupuacu flower

Cupuaçu trees usually range from 5–15 m (16–49 ft) in height, though some can reach 20 m (66 ft). They have brown bark, and the leaves range from 25–35 cm (9.8–13.8 in) long and 6–10 cm (2.4–3.9 in) across, with 9 or 10 pairs of veins. As the trees mature, the leaves change from pink-tinted to green, and eventually they begin bearing fruit.

Flowers of cupuaçu are structurally complex, and require pollination from biotic vectors. The majority of cupuaçu trees are self-incompatible, which can result in decreased pollination levels, and consequently, a decrease in fruit yields. Pollination can also be negatively affected by environmental conditions. Pollinators, which include chrysomelid weevils and stingless bees, are unable to fly between flowers in heavy rains.

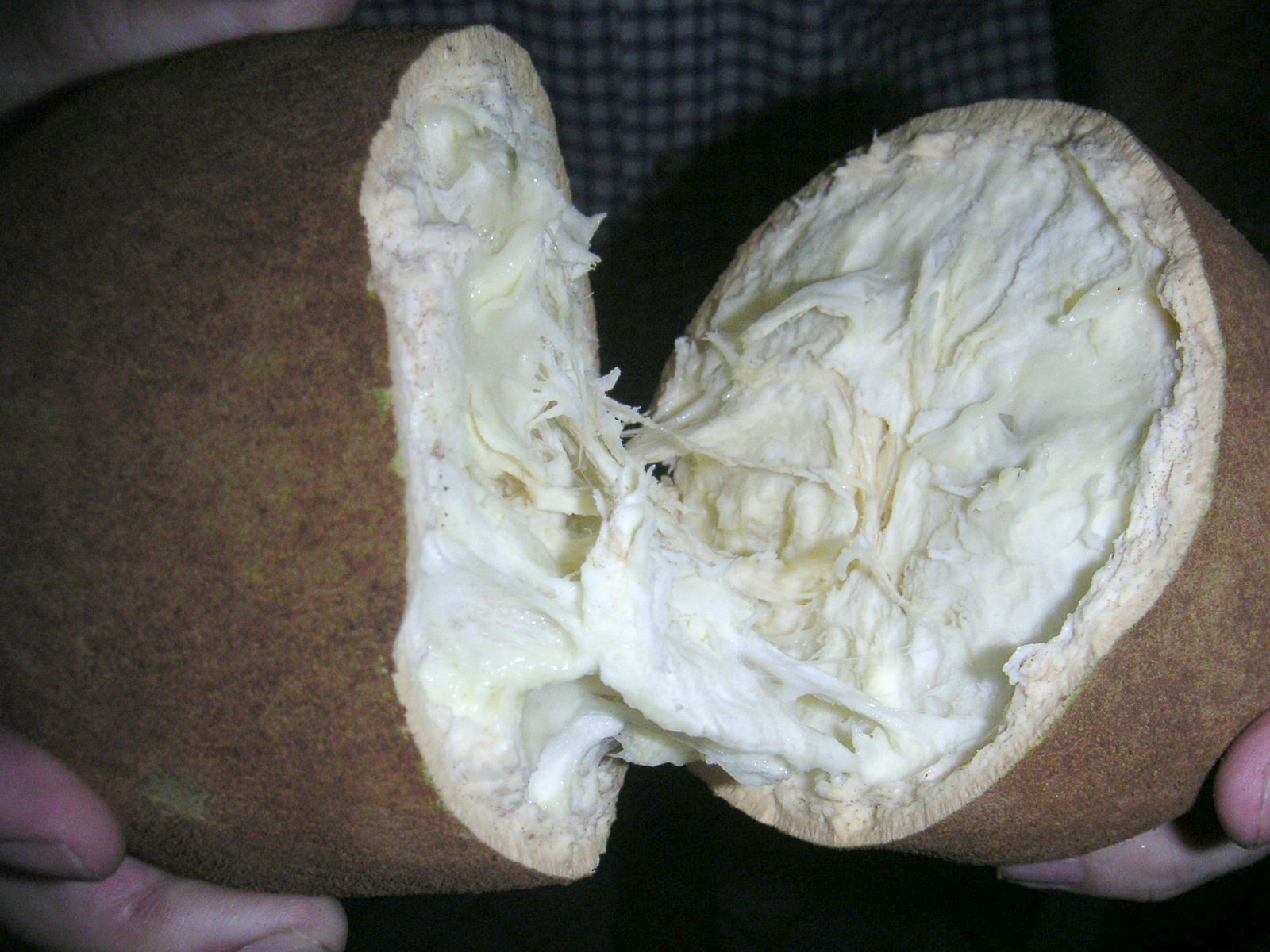
Cupuaçu fruit opened

The white pulp of the cupuaçu has an odour described as a mix of chocolate and pineapple and is frequently used in desserts, juices and sweets. The juice tastes primarily like pear, banana, passion fruit, and melon. Chocolate made from cupuaçu, very similar to that made from cocoa, is called cupulate.

== Cultivation ==
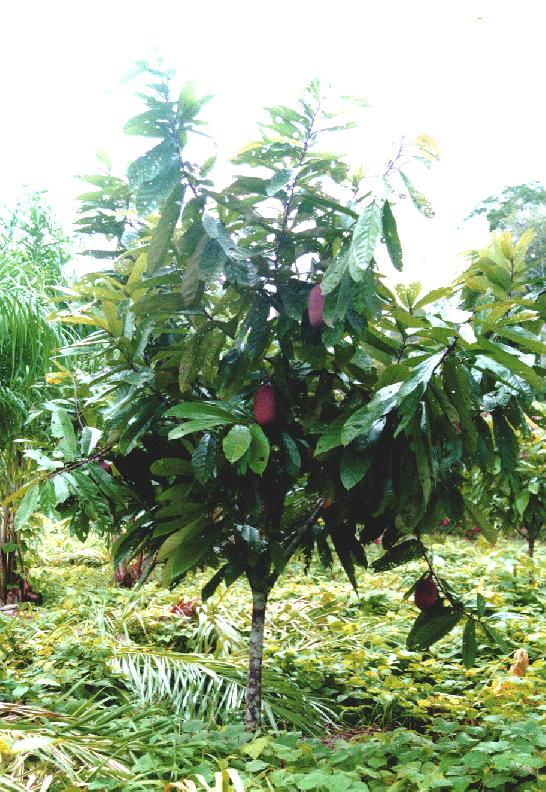
Cupuaçu, EMBRAPA plantation near Manaus, Brazil. Four years old.

Cupuaçu is most commonly propagated from seed, but grafting and rooted cuttings are also used.

Cupuaçu trees are often incorporated in agroforestry systems throughout the Amazon due to their high tolerance of infertile soils, which are predominant in the Amazon region.

Cupuaçu is generally harvested from the ground once they have naturally fallen from the tree. It can be difficult to determine peak ripeness because there is no noticeable external color change in the fruit. However studies have shown that in Western Colombian Amazon conditions, fruits generally reach full maturity within 117 days after fruit set. Brazilians either eat it raw or use it in making sweets.

Commercial food products include pulp and powder.

== Pests and diseases ==
Witches' broom (Moniliophthora perniciosa) is the most prominent disease that affects cupuaçu trees. It affects the entire tree and can result in significant loss of yields and even tree death if left untreated. Regular pruning is recommended to reduce the severity of this disease in cupuaçu plantings.

Cupuaçu supports the butterfly herbivore, "lagarta verde", Macrosoma tipulata (Hedylidae), which can be a defoliator.

== Phytochemicals ==
Cupuaçu flavors derive from its phytochemicals, such as tannins, glycosides, theograndins, catechins, quercetin, kaempferol and isoscutellarein. It also contains theacrine, caffeine, theobromine, and theophylline as found in cacao, although with a much lower amount of caffeine.

== Cupuaçu butter ==
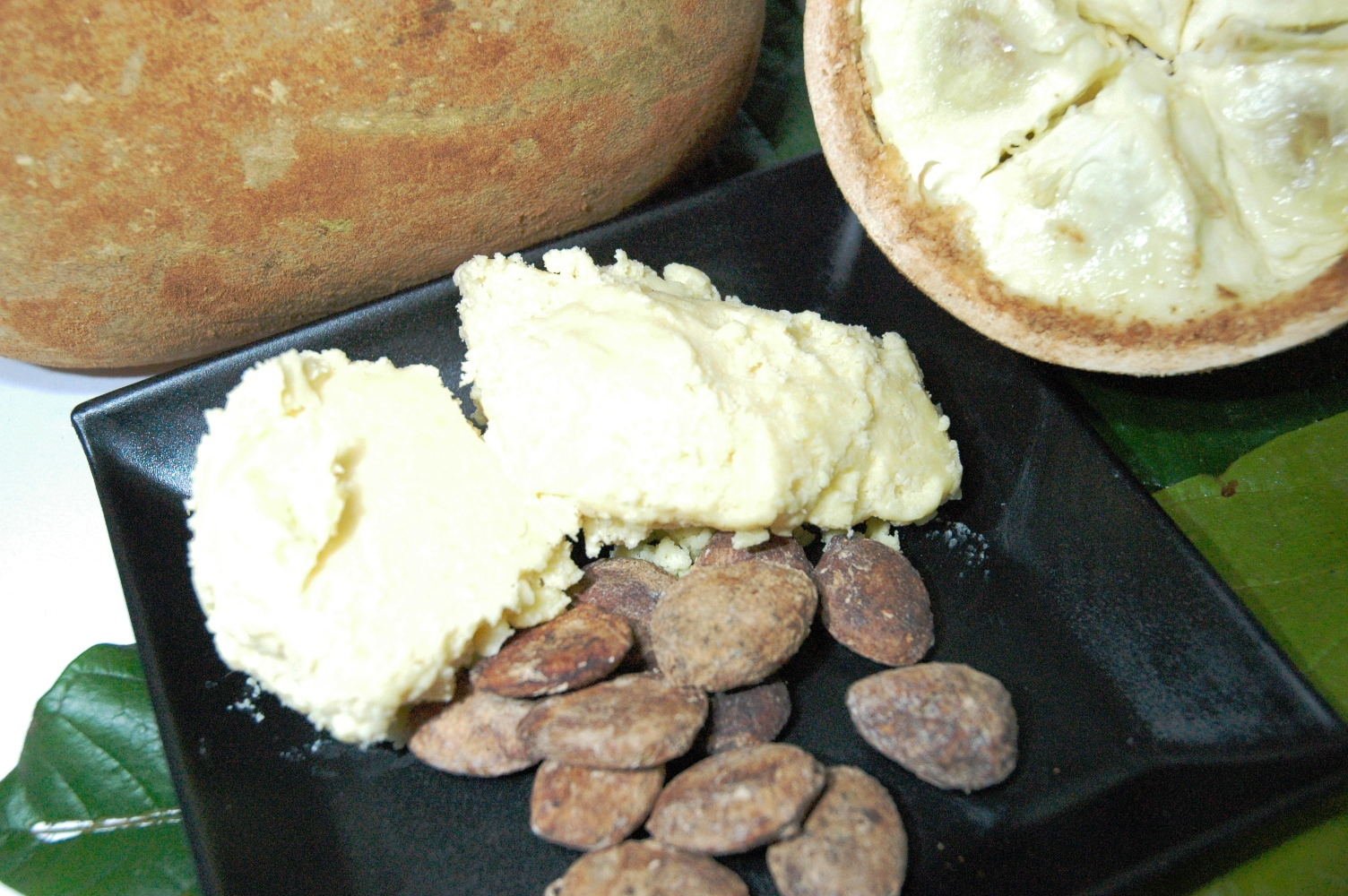
Cupuaçu butter (Portuguese: manteiga de cupuaçu)

Cupuaçu butter is a triglyceride composed of saturated and unsaturated fatty acids, giving the butter a low melting point (approximately 30 °C) and texture of a soft solid, lending its use as a confectionery resembling white chocolate. The main fatty acid components of cupuaçu butter are stearic acid (38%), oleic acid (38%), palmitic acid (11%), and arachidic acid (7%).

== See also ==
- Amazonian cuisine
- Theobroma bicolor
