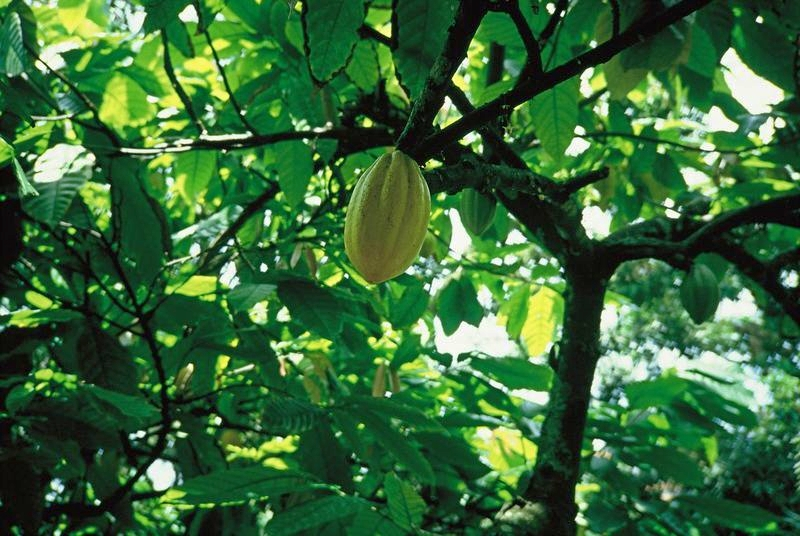
- Theobroma cacao pod, from which cocoa beans are harvested

Scientific classification
- Kingdom: Plantae
- Clade: Tracheophytes
- Clade: Angiosperms
- Clade: Eudicots
- Clade: Rosids
- Order: Malvales
- Family: Malvaceae
- Subfamily: Byttnerioideae
- Tribe: Theobromateae
- Genus: Theobroma; L.

Type species
- Theobroma cacao L.

Species
- See text

Synonyms
- Brotobroma H.Karst. & Triana; Cacao Tourn. ex Mill.; Deltonea Peckolt; Herrania Goudot; Lightia M.R.Schomb.; Tribroma O.F.Cook

= Theobroma =

Genus of flowering plants in the mallow family

Theobroma is a genus of flowering plants in the mallow family, Malvaceae. It was previously classified as a member of Sterculiaceae, which has been incorporated into Malvaceae to make it monophyletic. It contains 41 species of small understory trees native to the tropical forests of Central and South America.

The seeds of the cacao tree (Theobroma cacao), the best known species of the genus, are used for making chocolate. Cupuaçu (Theobroma grandiflorum), mocambo (Theobroma bicolor) and capacui (Theobroma speciosum) are also of economic importance.

== Taxonomy ==
It was published by Carl Linnaeus in 1753. The lectotype Theobroma cacao L. was designated in 1929.

=== Etymology ===
The generic name is derived from the Greek words θεός theos meaning "god" and βρῶμα broma meaning "food" translating to "food of the gods".

=== Phylogeny ===
A phylogeny of nearly all species in the genus along with the genera Guazuma and Glossostemon, which are other representatives of the tribe Theobromateae, is available.

=== Species ===
As of November 2025 Plants of the World Online accepts 41 species:

Image	Scientific name	Distribution
	Theobroma albiflorum (Goudot) De Wild.	Colombia and Venezuela
	Theobroma angustifolium DC.	Costa Rica, Mexico, Nicaragua, and Panamá
	Theobroma asperum (H.Karst. & Triana) K.Schum. ex C.J.J.Hall	northern Brazil, Colombia, Ecuador, Peru, and Venezuela
	Theobroma balaense (H.Preuss) De Wild.	Colombia and Ecuador
	Theobroma bernoullii Pittier	Panama
	Theobroma bicolor Bonpl. – mocambo	Brazil North, Colombia, Peru, and Venezuela
	Theobroma breviligulatum (R.E.Schult.) Colli-Silva	Colombia and Ecuador
	Theobroma cacao L. – cacao	Brazil, Colombia, Costa Rica, Ecuador, French Guiana,GL Guatemala ,Guyana, Mexico, Peru, Suriname, and Venezuela
	Theobroma camargoanum (R.E.Schult.) Ducke	southeastern Colombia, southern Venezuela, and northwestern Brazil
	Theobroma canumanense Pires & Fróes ex Cuatrec.	Brazil
	Theobroma cirmolinae Cuatrec.	Colombia
	Theobroma cuatrecasasianum (García-Barr.) Colli-Silva	Colombia and Ecuador
	Theobroma dugandii (García-Barr.) Colli-Silva	Colombia and Ecuador
	Theobroma flaviflorum Aguilar & D.Santam.	Costa Rica
	Theobroma gileri Cuatrec.	Colombia and Ecuador
	Theobroma glaucum H.Karst.	Brazil, Colombia, Ecuador, and Peru
	Theobroma globosum Colli-Silva	northern Brazil (Acre and Amazonas) and Peru
	Theobroma grandiflorum (Willd. ex Spreng.) K.Schum. – cupuaçu	Bolivia, Brazil, Guyana, and Venezuela
	Theobroma guianense (Aubl.) J.F.Gmel.	Bolivia, northern and central Brazil, Colombia, Ecuador, French Guiana, Guyana, Suriname, and Venezuela
	Theobroma hylaeum Cuatrec.	Colombia and Panamá
	Theobroma kanukuense (R.E.Schult.) Colli-Silva	Guianas and northern Brazil
	Theobroma kofanorum (R.E.Schult.) Colli-Silva	Colombia and Ecuador
	Theobroma laciniifolium (Goudot ex Triana & Planch.) De Wild.	Colombia
	Theobroma lemniscatum (R.H.Schomb.) Colli-Silva	northern Brazil, northeastern Colombia, Guyana, Suriname, and Venezuela
	Theobroma mammosum Cuatrec. & J.León	Costa Rica and Nicaragua
	Theobroma mariae (Mart.) K.Schum.	northern Brazil, Colombia, Ecuador, and Peru
	Theobroma microcarpum Mart.	Bolivia, Brazil, Colombia, and Venezuela
	Theobroma nemorale Cuatrec.	Colombia
	Theobroma nervosum Colli-Silva	Colombia and Ecuador
	Theobroma nycterodendron (R.E.Schult.) Colli-Silva	Bolivia, northern Brazil, Colombia, Ecuador, and Peru
	Theobroma obovatum Klotzsch ex Bernoulli	Bolivia, northern Brazil, Colombia, Guyana, Peru, and Venezuela
	Theobroma pulcherrimum (Goudot) De Wild.	Colombia, Ecuador, and Panama
	Theobroma purpureum Pittier	Colombia, Costa Rica, Ecuador, Nicaragua, Panamá, and Venezuela
	Theobroma schultesii Colli-Silva	Colombia, Ecuador, and Peru
	Theobroma simiarum Donn.Sm.	Colombia, Costa Rica, Ecuador, Nicaragua, and Panamá
	Theobroma sinuosum Pav. ex Huber	Brazil and Peru
	Theobroma speciosum Willd. ex Spreng. – cacaui	Bolivia, Brazil, Peru, Venezuela
	Theobroma sylvestre Aubl. ex Mart.	Brazil
	Theobroma tomentellum (R.E.Schult.) Colli-Silva	Colombia
	Theobroma umbraticum (R.E.Schult.) Colli-Silva	Colombia
	Theobroma velutinum Benoist	Brazil, French Guiana, and Suriname

=== Formerly placed here ===
- Abroma augustum (L.) L.f. (as T. augustum L.)
- Guazuma ulmifolia Lam. (as T. guazuma L.)

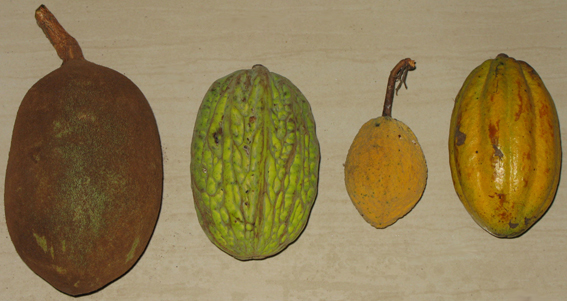
From left to right: T. grandiflorum, T. bicolor, T. speciosum, T. cacao

== Uses ==
Several species of Theobroma produce edible seeds, notably cacao, cupuaçu, and mocambo. Cacao is commercially valued as the source of cocoa and chocolate.

Theobroma species are used as food plants by the larvae of some moths of the genus Endoclita, including E. chalybeatus, E. damor, E. hosei and E. sericeus. The larvae of another moth, Hypercompe muzina, feed exclusively on Theobroma cacao.

An active ingredient of cacao, theobromine, is named for the genus.
