= Endoclita hosei =

Scientific classification
- Kingdom: Animalia
- Phylum: Arthropoda
- Class: Insecta
- Order: Lepidoptera
- Family: Hepialidae
- Genus: Endoclita
- Species: E. hoesi

Binomial name
- Endoclita hoesi Tindale, 1958

Species of moth

Endoclita hoesi is a species of moth of the family Hepialidae. It is known from Borneo. Food plants for this species include Elettaria, Eucalyptus, and Theobroma.
