= Isoscutellarein =

Names
- IUPAC name 4′,5,7,8-Tetrahydroxyflavone
- Systematic IUPAC name 5,7,8-Trihydroxy-2-(4-hydroxyphenyl)-4H-1-benzopyran-4-one
- Other names 8-Hydroxyapigenin

Identifiers
CAS Number	41440-05-5
3D model (JSmol)	Interactive image
ChemSpider	4444984
PubChem CID	5281665
UNII	3WAC3UX5SC
CompTox Dashboard (EPA)	DTXSID20415172
- InChI: InChI=1S/C15H10O6/c16-8-3-1-7(2-4-8)12-6-10(18)13-9(17)5-11(19)14(20)15(13)21-12/h1-6,16-17,19-20H Key: NXHQVROAKYDSNW-UHFFFAOYSA-N; InChI=1/C15H10O6/c16-8-3-1-7(2-4-8)12-6-10(18)13-9(17)5-11(19)14(20)15(13)21-12/h1-6,16-17,19-20H Key: NXHQVROAKYDSNW-UHFFFAOYAQ
- SMILES: C1=CC(=CC=C1C2=CC(=O)C3=C(O2)C(=C(C=C3O)O)O)O

Properties
Chemical formula	C_{15}H_{10}O_{6}
Molar mass	286.239 g·mol^{−1}
- Except where otherwise noted, data are given for materials in their standard state (at 25 °C [77 °F], 100 kPa). Infobox references

Isoscutellarein is a flavone found in Cupuaçu (Theobroma grandiflorum) and in the liverwort Marchantia berteroana.

Theograndin I is a sulfated glucuronide of isoscutellarein.
