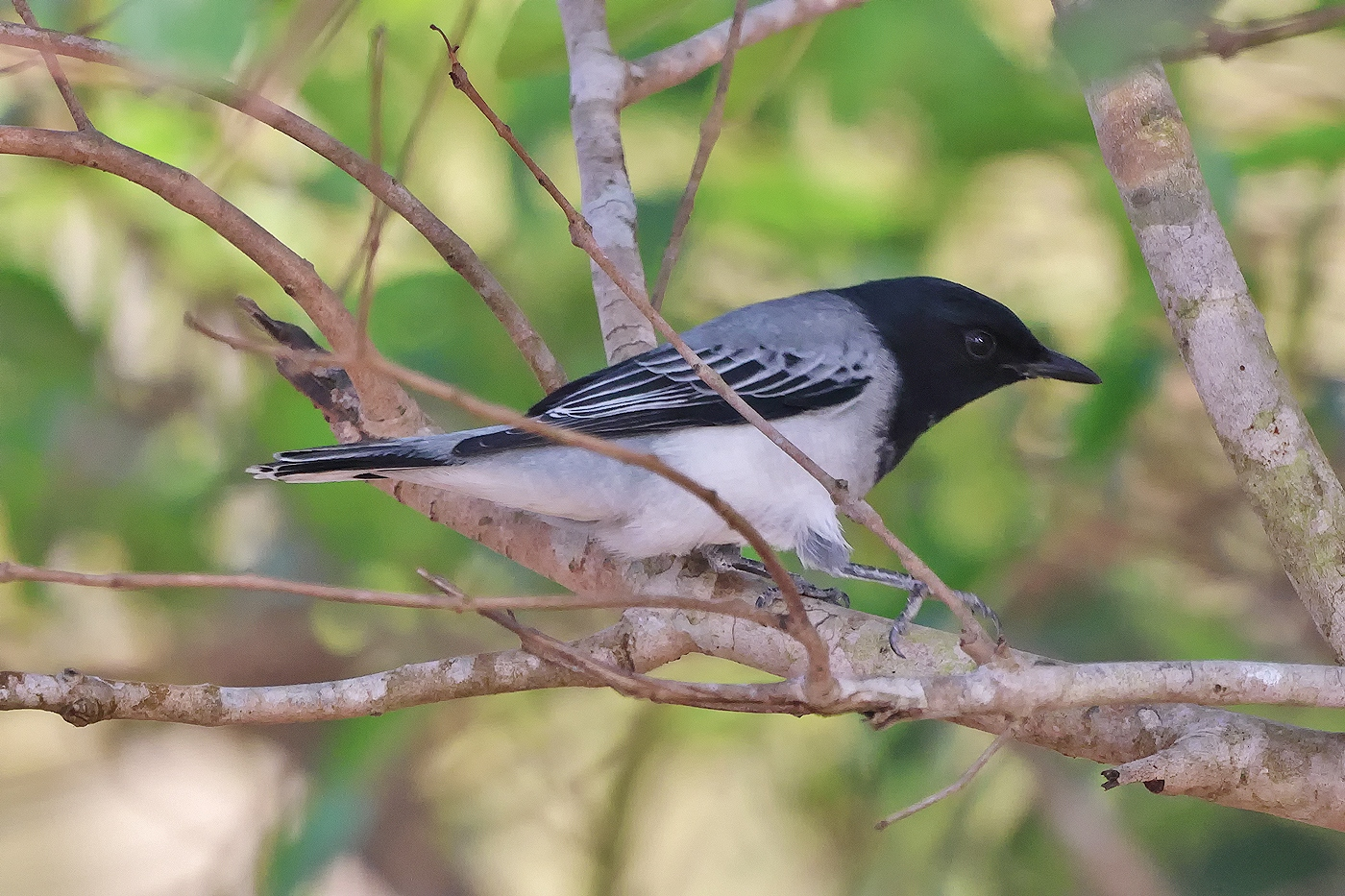
- Male
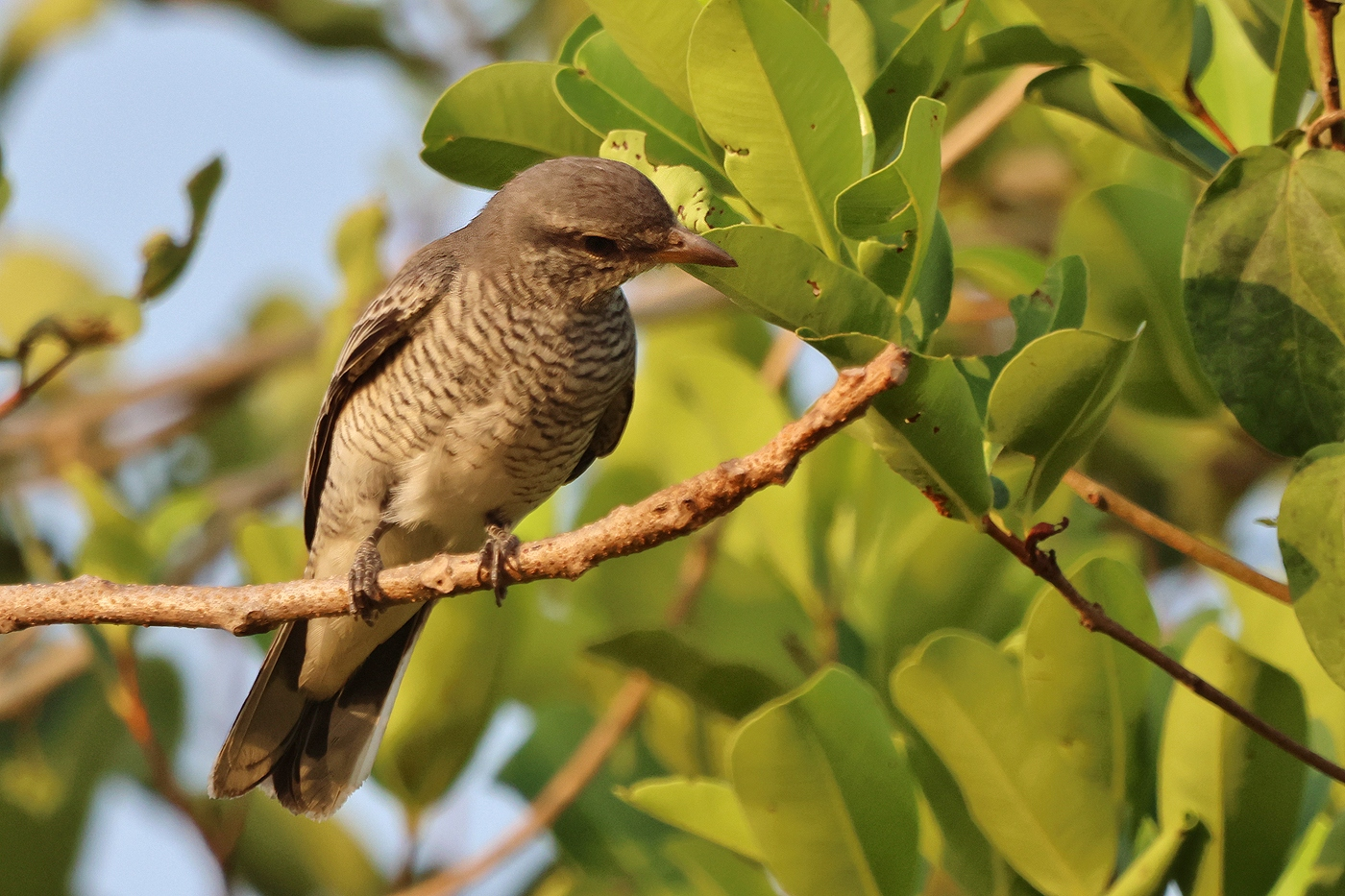
- Female

Conservation status
- Least Concern (IUCN 3.1)

Scientific classification
- Kingdom: Animalia
- Phylum: Chordata
- Class: Aves
- Order: Passeriformes
- Family: Campephagidae
- Genus: Lalage
- Species: L. melanoptera

Binomial name
- Lalage melanoptera (Rüppell, 1839)

Synonyms
- Coracina melanoptera

= Black-headed cuckooshrike =

Black-headed Cuckooshrike

Species of bird

The black-headed cuckooshrike (Lalage melanoptera) is a species of cuckooshrike found in the Indian subcontinent and Southeast Asia.

== Description ==
The Black-headed Cuckooshrike is a 18-20 cm slender bird found in the Indian subcontinent with distinct sexual dimorphism. Males feature a dark slaty-grey hood, neck, and upper breast, contrasting with a pale grey back and white belly. They have blackish wings with grey edges and white-tipped tail feathers. The females are duller, with brownish-grey upperparts, a whitish supercilium (eyebrow), and heavily barred underparts with a dark grey bill.

== Distribution and habitat ==
This is a resident and partially bird migratory that is found across the Indian subcontinent, including India, Bangladesh, Sri Lanka, Nepal, and Bhutan, extending to Myanmar. It inhabits open, dry-deciduous, or semi-evergreen forests, secondary growth, bamboo patches, and, frequently, urban gardens, orchards, and agricultural plantations up to 2,100 meters, typically preferring lower altitudes. Primarily distributed across India (from the Himalayan foothills in the north to the peninsula, including Rajasthan, Gujarat, Maharashtra, and Kerala), with breeding populations in Nepal and Sri Lanka. While mostly resident, it is a summer breeding visitor in the Himalayan foothills and North India, often moving to southern regions or lower altitudes during the winter. They prefer open wooded habitats over thick, dense forests. Common in scrub-jungle, wooded suburban areas, and mixed deciduous woodlands.

== Behaviour and diet ==
They are arboreal, foraging in the canopy of tall trees. They move methodically from tree to tree, searching foliage for prey, often joining mixed-species foraging flocks. They have an undulating, "dipping" flight pattern. and like other cuckooshrikes, they have a characteristic habit of rearranging or shuffling their wings upon landing. Often quiet, their song is a series of clear, mellow, whistled notes ("twit-wit-wit-wee-twéé-twéé-twy-twy-twy"). They also produce a rapid, high-pitched call. They are primarily insectivorous, favoring caterpillars (Lepidoptera), beetles, ants, and cicadas. They supplement their diet with fruits, including Lantana berries and figs.

== Breeding and reproduction ==
Their breeding season varies by region, generally occurring from April to May in South India and Sri Lanka, and June to September in North India and Nepal. The nest is a small, cup-shaped nest made of twigs, rootlets, and plant fibers, which is typically bound together with cobwebs. The placement is usually 2–8 meters high in the fork of a bare branch. Both sexes participate in building the nest and share responsibilities for incubation, which lasts for 2–3 eggs per clutch.

== Gallery ==
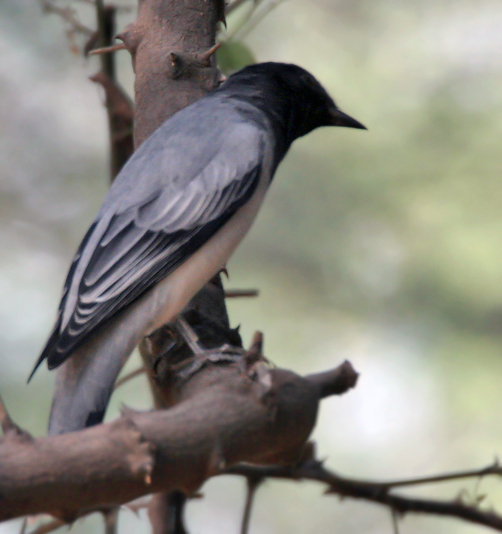
Male at Sindhrot in Vadodara district of Gujarat, India.

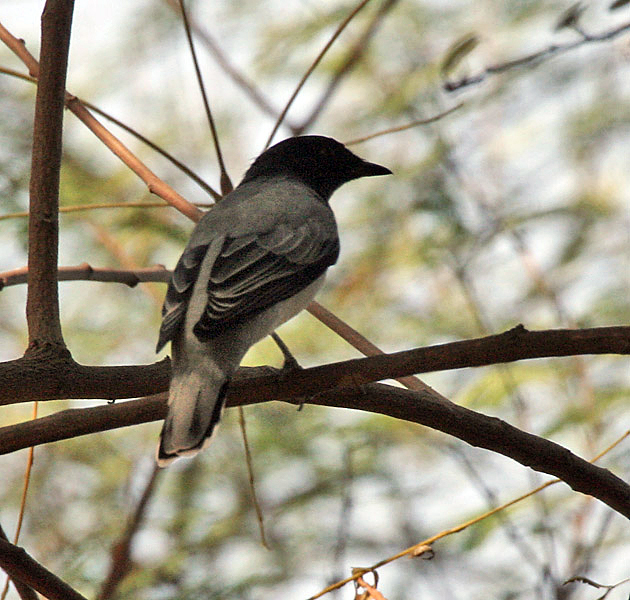
Male at Sindhrot in Vadodara district of Gujarat, India.

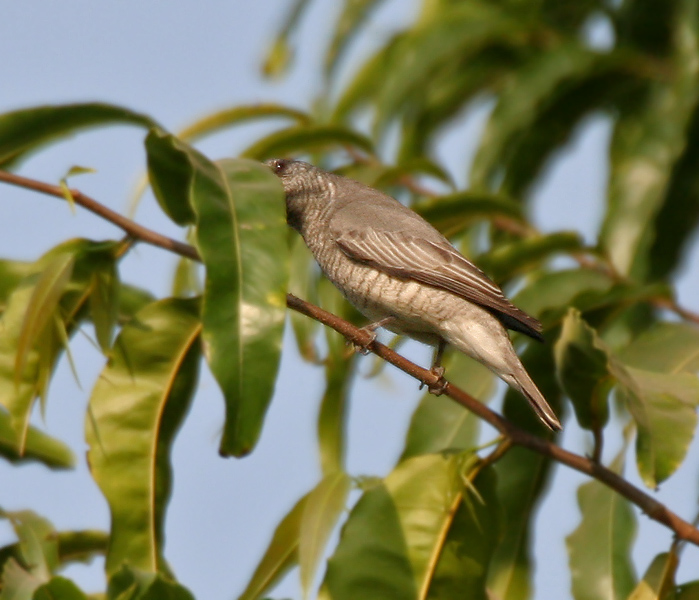
Female in Kinnerasani Wildlife Sanctuary, Andhra Pradesh, India.

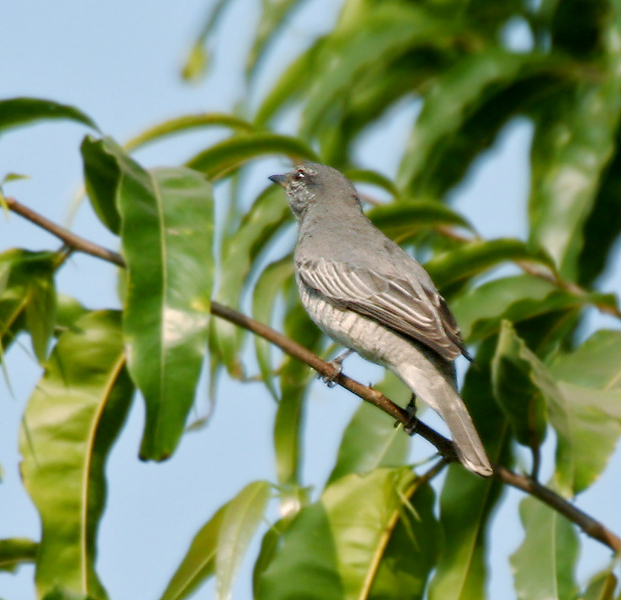
Female in Kinnerasani Wildlife Sanctuary, Andhra Pradesh, India.

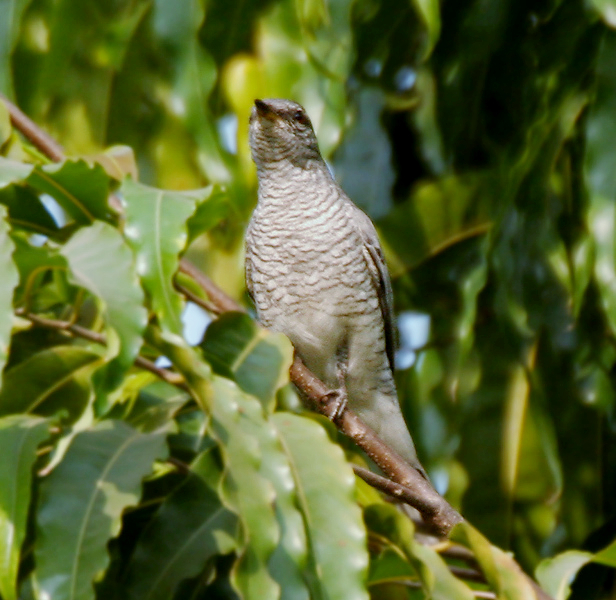
Female in Kinnerasani Wildlife Sanctuary, Andhra Pradesh, India.

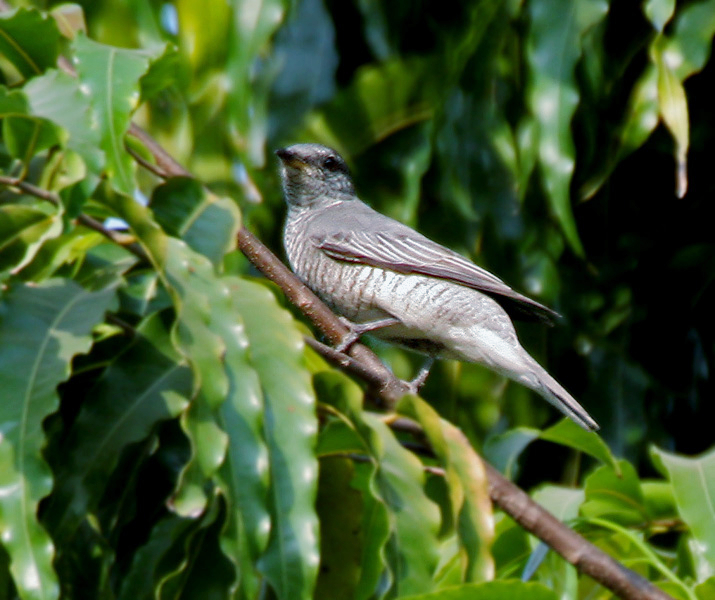
Female in Kinnerasani Wildlife Sanctuary, Andhra Pradesh, India.

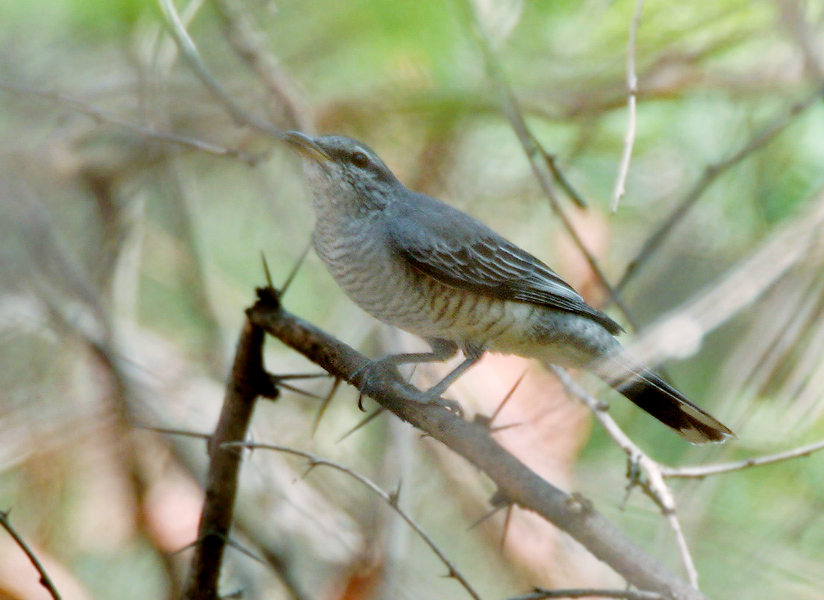
Female in Hyderabad, India.

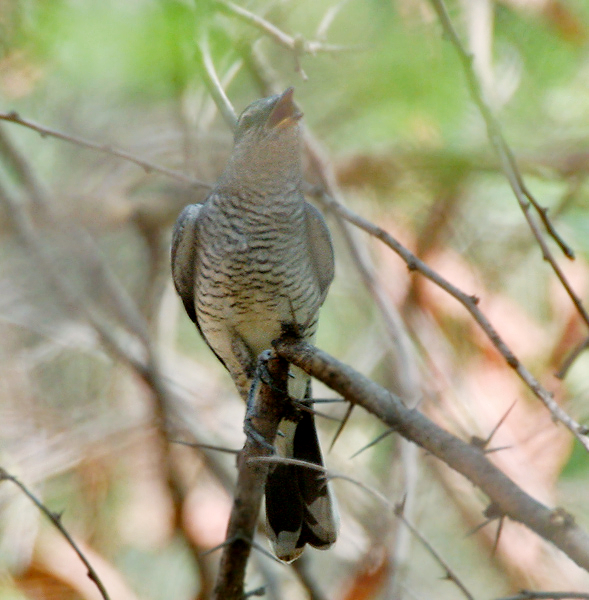
Female in Hyderabad, India.
