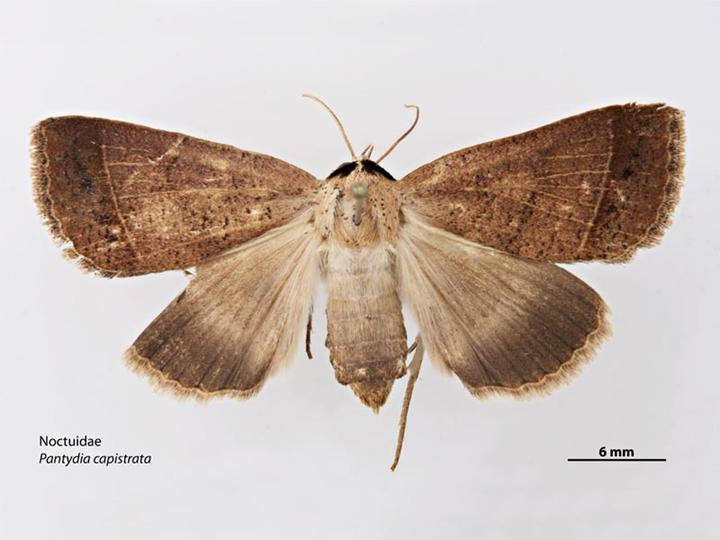
- Pantydia capistrata

Scientific classification
- Kingdom: Animalia
- Phylum: Arthropoda
- Class: Insecta
- Order: Lepidoptera
- Superfamily: Noctuoidea
- Family: Erebidae
- Tribe: Euclidiini
- Genus: Pantydia; Guenée in Boisduval & Guenée, 1852

Synonyms
- Rhiscipha Walker, 1865; Tantydia Tillyard, 1926

= Pantydia =

Genus of moths

Pantydia is a genus of moths in the family Erebidae.

== Species ==
- Pantydia andersoni (Felder & Rogenhofer, 1874)
- Pantydia bicolora (Bethune-Baker, 1906)
- Pantydia canescens Walker, 1869
- Pantydia capistrata Lucas, 1894
- Pantydia diemeni Guenée, 1852
- Pantydia dufayi Laporte, 1975
- Pantydia klossi (Rothschild, 1915)
- Pantydia metaphaea Hampson, 1912
- Pantydia metaspila Walker, [1858]
- Pantydia scissa (Walker, 1865)
- Pantydia sparsa Guenée, 1852

== Former species ==
- Pantydia discisigna (Hampson, 1894) (Anomis)
- Pantydia dochmosticha Turner, 1933
- Pantydia orthosiodes (Walker, 1865)
