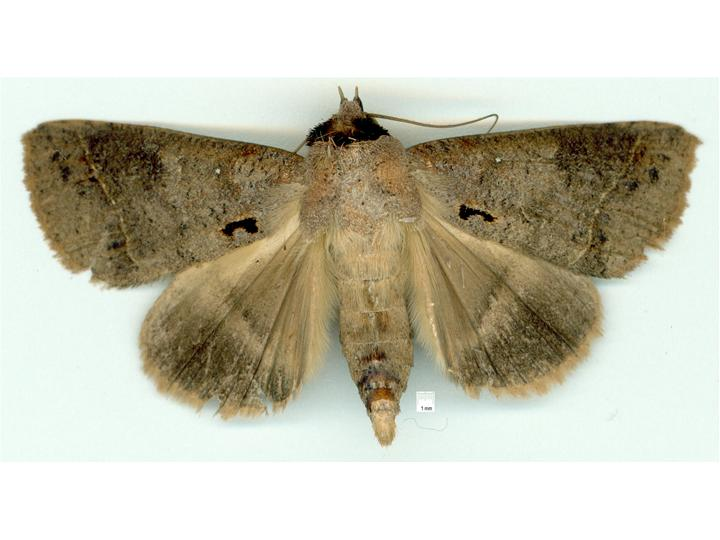

Scientific classification
- Kingdom: Animalia
- Phylum: Arthropoda
- Class: Insecta
- Order: Lepidoptera
- Superfamily: Noctuoidea
- Family: Erebidae
- Genus: Pantydia
- Species: P. metaspila

Binomial name
- Pantydia metaspila (Walker, [1858])

Synonyms
- Toxocampa metaspila Walker, [1858]; Ophiusa pallidilinea Walker, 1858; Polydesma metaspila Hampson, 1853; Toxocampa moolla Swinhoe, 1885; Toxocampa moolia Poole, 1989; Hypaetra sordida Butler, 1886

= Pantydia metaspila =

Species of moth

Pantydia metaspila is a species of moth of the family Erebidae first described by Francis Walker in 1858. It is found in China, Japan (Ryukyus), India (Maharashtra), Thailand, Taiwan, the Maledives, Sri Lanka, the Philippines (Luzon, Negros), Borneo, Sumatra, Sulawesi, the Tanimbar Islands, Seram, Papua New Guinea, the Caroline Islands, the Solomon Islands, Vanuatu, Fiji, as well as Australia, where it has been recorded from Queensland.

== Description ==
The wingspan is about 30–42 mm. Palpi with longer third joint. Hindlegs of male tufted with long hair to the extremity of the tarsi. Mid tibia of male with no masses of flocculent (woolly) hair contained in a fold. Body ochreous brown with black collar. Forewings irrorated (sprinkled) with dark brown. A comma-shaped black mark found above inner margin before middle. Faint traces of the orbicular and reniform can be seen. A post-medial ochreous-brown-edged line present, with a series of fuscous marks beyond it. Hindwings pale, with diffused medial line and outer fuscous area.

The larvae feed on Dillwynia, Vigna (including Vigna marina) and Gmelina species, as well as Glycine max.
