= McCowat's Farm =

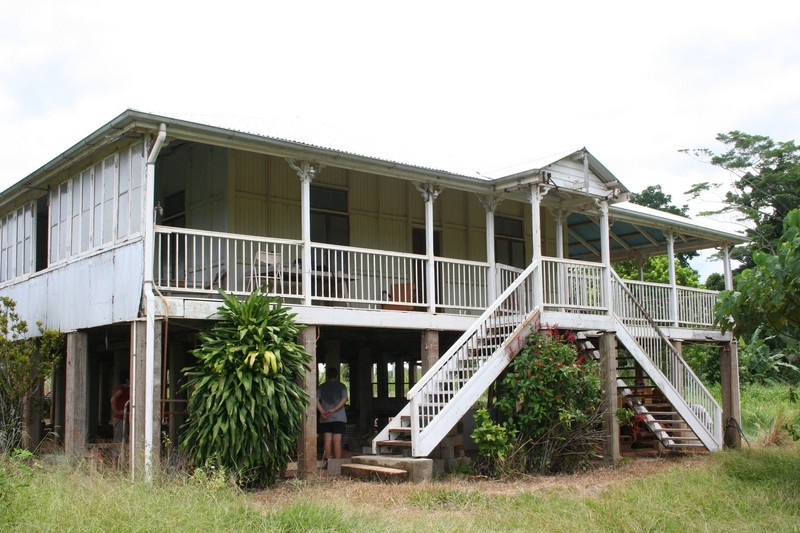
- McCowat's Farm, front view, 2008

- Location within Queensland Location within Australia
- 17.4609°S 145.9836°E
- Location: McCowat Road, Garradunga, Cassowary Coast Region, Queensland, Australia

History
- Design period: 1919 - 1930s (interwar period)
- Built: 1920 - 1936

Queensland Heritage Register
- Official name: McCowat's Farm, Koodla
- Type: state heritage (landscape, built)
- Designated: 21 October 1992
- Reference no.: 600632
- Significant period: 1920s (historical)
- Significant components: farmhouse, trees of social, historic or special significance, residential accommodation - workers' quarters, furniture/fittings, trees - remnant scrub, barracks - workers
- Builders: William Purdy

McCowat's Farm is a heritage-listed plantation at McCowat Road, Garradunga, Cassowary Coast Region, Queensland, Australia. It was built in 1920 by William Purdy. It is also known as Koodla. It was added to the Queensland Heritage Register on 21 October 1992.

== History ==
McCowat's Farm comprises a residence, cottage, barracks, implement shed and remnant rainforest, representing the surviving core of a 120 acres (49 ha) cane farm operated by Thomas McCowat from 1926/7. The farm was subsequently subdivided into its current size for Thomas McCowat's retirement.

In the early 20th century Garradunga, a small settlement in the northern part of the Johnstone district on the former main road linking Innisfail with Cairns, was a sugar production area. Innisfail (known as Geraldton until 1911), was founded as the port of Geraldton in 1880 by Thomas Henry Fitzgerald, who had arrived on the banks of the Johnstone River to grow sugar cane on a 10,000 hectares (25,000 acres) land grant funded by the Roman Catholic Bishop of Brisbane and All Hallows' Sisters of Mercy. Others arrived soon after and a community was soon established with an economy based firmly on sugar production. A number of sugar mills operated in the Johnstone district: the Innisfail Estate Sugar Mill began crushing in 1881 but was closed by 18851; the Queensland Sugar Company's Innishowen Mill commenced on the Queensland Estate in 1883 and closed in 1891; Goondi Mill first crushed in 1885 and closed in 1986; the Mourilyan Mill opened in 1884; and the South Johnstone Mill was established in 1916. Both the Mourilyan and South Johnstone mills are still operating.

During the early 1920s, Garradunga became a staging point for the transport of goods and passengers travelling north/south by rail until the section of the North Coast railway line between Garradunga and Innisfail was completed in 1924. The Goondi Mill 2 ft gauge tramway, which connected the cane fields of the Johnstone district with the Mill near Innisfail, provided a temporary transport link connecting a "missing section" of the north coast railway between Garradunga and Daradgee. The rail link transported a large number of passengers in the early 1920s (108,458 during 1921–22) but passenger use declined dramatically due to the advent of motorcars and during the Great Depression. By 1935 passenger use had dropped to 5–6,000 per year. The rail continued to provide an important transport link between the cane farms, the mills and the port at Mourilyan. In 1929, 92% of goods carried on the tramway were sugar or cane.

The opening of the Brisbane to Cairns railway line took place in 1924 with the completion of the north Johnstone Bridge. This gave further impetus to the development of the Johnstone Shire. In the 1920s the district was producing record yields of sugar, and the prosperity engendered by this is reflected in the many substantial buildings erected in the district in the 1920s and 30s. Between 1920 and 1930 the total population of the Shire ballooned from 5,549 to 18,088 people. The number of recorded dwellings also rose during this time, from 700 to 3,130. Sugar production was regarded as the mainstay of production and white settlement on the north Queensland coastline.

Thomas McCowat immigrated to Australia in 1904, aged 20, having been brought up at a Presbyterian orphanage in Scotland. He worked in the Presbyterian Ministry in Toowoomba before serving as the Presbyterian Minister in Herberton in 1909 and 1910. On 7 July 1909 he married Mary Barrie Outerson, a recent arrival from Musselburgh, Scotland. Mary reputedly suffered from tuberculosis and died on 13 March 1923 in the Herberton Hospital. Thomas and Mary had two children, aged 8 and 10 when Mary died. It was during Mary's illness that Thomas left the Ministry and worked as a fettler on the railway in Johnstone Shire, to fund Mary's hospice.

Thomas married Alice Robina Bonar, a descendant of a mining family living in Herberton, in 1924. They had one child, Alice, in 1925. According to family oral history, as a result of Mary's health issues, Thomas was determined to provide comfortable living arrangements for his second wife.

Thomas and Alice McCowat purchased 120 acres (49 ha) from Mr Ramlock, in 2 installments on 16 July 1926 and 28 January 1927, for a total of £247, although family oral history indicates that the McCowat's had been farming in the Johnstone district in the 1920s prior to the purchase of McCowat's Farm. They named the residence Koodla, an Aboriginal word meaning shady place and continued the farms operation in sugar production.

William Purdy, builder, from Innisfail, had erected the main section of the house in 1920 but what is now the kitchen/bathroom annexe appears to be an early style workers cottage, which was possibly erected at an earlier time. It appears that the annexe was joined to the main house when it was built in 1920. The residence was located on what was then the main road between Cairns and Innisfail. In 1936 the residence (main section and annexe) was dismantled and re-erected approximately 1 kilometre (0.62 mi) away on its present site, which was the centre of McCowat's Farm, at a cost of £145 by carpenter F Shellback.

The McCowat's lived in the cottage at the rear of the property when the main residence was moved to its present location. The cottage is of similar construction to the kitchen/bathroom annexe to the main residence, being a typical three room gable roof cottage. It is recorded as being constructed prior to 1920, and used as the original canecutters' barracks. The verandah was enclosed in 1936, presumably when the McCowat's lived in it. The barracks, typical of five roomed canecutters' barracks, and the implement shed, were erected in 1930. The barracks accommodated canecutters working on the McCowat's property and also was rented out to cutters working on nearby properties.

Thomas McCowat managed the property until he died in 1963. The farm was subdivided sometime prior to Thomas McCowat's death, and the block containing the residence, cottage, barracks and rainforest is currently owned by his daughter, Miss Allie McCowat.

The remnant rainforest on McCowat's Farm is a rare type of vegetation, classified by Paul Sattler and Rebecca Williams in The Conservation Status of Queensland's Bioregional Ecosystems as 7.8.1, complex mesophyll vine forest that grows on very wet and wet lowlands and foothills, on basalt derived soils in the Wet Tropical coast. Its biodiversity status is recorded by the Wet Tropics Management Authority as "of concern" and is known to contain a number of rare or endangered floral species and is a known cassowary habitat. It is estimated that only 10–30% of the original extent of this type of vegetation survives, due to extensive clearing for agriculture. The lowland basalt soils were favoured for agricultural production as they had the optimum growing conditions of rainfall, fertility, topography and temperature.

== Description ==
McCowat's Farm comprises 9.032 hectares (22.32 acres) of land approximately 2 kilometres (1.2 mi) west of Garradunga, a small settlement in the northern part of the Johnstone district on the former main road linking Innisfail with Cairns. The surrounding land use is mainly cane farms and the North Coast rail line passes near the north eastern corner of the property. Approximately two-thirds of the property is rainforest. The main buildings and structures on the farm include the main residence, the cottage, the former cane barracks, and the implement shed.

The residence is a high set four room bungalow with wrap around verandah on four sides. It has a rear annex showing typical elements of a raised two room workers cottage.

A symmetrical staircase with dowel railings leads from the ground to a porch coming off the front verandah. The wrap around verandah has two rail dowel balustrades on the north, south, and west sides. The east side of the verandah is enclosed with casement windows and corrugated iron. Storage areas, clad in corrugated iron with two sash windows each, are contained on the south-east and south-west corners of the verandah. There is a 1980s addition of toilet and shower in the centre of the west side of the verandah. Aluminum blinds are fixed externally on the north, east and west sides of the verandah and there a wall of lattice is present as the northern ground floor wall.

The main section of the residence has exposed-stud framing lined internally with vertically jointed tongue and groove timber. Internal ceilings are lined, with unlined external verandah ceilings. Internally there are four rooms (3 bedrooms and a sitting room) and a hall. Internal doors have paired rectangular panels above and below the waist and are reportedly constructed of solid oak. The external doors, two doors leading from each of the three bedrooms to the verandah, are French doors, low waisted with 2 rectangular glass top panels and fanlights. The two doors of the rear bedroom have extra security measures consisting of metal wire sliding doors. There are no doors leading to the verandah from the living room. Italian Muranese glass has reportedly been used for fanlights, casement windows and colonial windows. The house sits on concrete stumps and there is a concrete floor underneath. The roof of the main residence and annexe is galvanised iron. The house is oriented north.

A small gabled annex to the main residence contains a kitchen, living area and bathroom and is joined to the rear verandah of the main residence by a short footbridge. The rear north eastern corner of the annex contains the bathroom and a set of stairs exits the annex at the rear, or south side of the building. The annex is externally clad in corrugated iron and the kitchen/living area is internally lined with pine boarding and hardboard. Only the partition walls in the bathroom are lined internally. Records indicate the framing of the annex is Pendar, a local rainforest hardwood. It is externally clad in corrugated iron and has two window shades and aluminum fixed blinds over sash windows on the eastern side.

A range of original furniture is present inside the residence, including dining tables, one constructed of large panels of oak, two double and one single cast-iron bed, wardrobes and dressing tables, a baby's folding feeding chair and claw bath ensemble.

An iron tank sits above a corrugated iron clad shed containing a shower room at the rear of the west side of the annex. To the south east of the annexe is a dog's grave marked with a cross shaped headstone and a lily garden. Oral history indicates a number of family dogs are buried here.

Five hundred metres to the south west of the main residence is the cottage. This is a low set three roomed gable roofed cottage with enclosed front verandahs. External walls are clad with fibrous cement sheeting and internally the walls are clad in a combination of fibrous cement and corrugated iron with timber floors. A corrugated iron lean-to is attached to the west side of the building.

The cottage is raised on short concrete stumps. Three concrete steps lead to the front door. Ornamental cast-iron work is attached to the base of the front wall. Three panel casement windows are present either side of the front door and there are three four panel sash windows on each side of the cottage.

The implement shed is located to the west of the main residence. It is constructed of bush timber and clad in corrugated iron. A range of agricultural machinery is contained within the shed, including items such as a 1930s Caterpillar tractor and other old tractors, corn grinders, cane planters and an icy ball refrigerator.

The cane barracks are a long, low-set building located at the front (northern) end of the property. They are constructed of bush posts with hardwood rails, clad in corrugated iron with no internal lining. The external iron has been painted red and the roof is galvanized iron. A bedroom wing runs east/west containing five bedrooms with internal partitions of corrugated iron, each opening onto a north facing verandah. Each room has a window on the southern side consisting of timber frames lined with corrugated iron, hinged as awning sashes. The north/south wing contains one large room which forms the kitchen and dining area, which also opens onto the northern verandah. A large 10-person table constructed of 2 boards, each 55 centimetres (22 in) wide, is present in the dining area.

=== Rainforest ===
The rainforest covers approximately two thirds of the property and forms an impression of a green curtain to the west of the farming complex. Typical species that make up this type of rainforest are described as Acmena graveolens, Alstonia scholaris, Archontophoenix alexandrae, Argyrodendron peralatum, Backhousia bancroftii, Beilschmiedia tooram, Castanospermum australe, Cryptocarya corrugata, C. grandis, C. hypospodia, C. mackinnoniana, Diploglottis smithii, Didymocheton papuanus, D. pettigrewianus, Elaeocarpus angustifolius, Endiandra palmerstonii, E. pubens, E. sankeyana, Epicharis parasitica, Ficus racemosa, F. septica, Gmelina fasciculiflora, Helici nortoniana, Intsia bijuga, Musgravea heterophylla, Myristica muelleri, Palaquium galactoxylum, Syzygium cormiflorum, and S. kuranda. Miss McCowat reports that no tracks are present into the rainforest on her property as this is the best way to preserve the rainforest flora and fauna.

== Heritage listing ==
McCowat's Farm was listed on the Queensland Heritage Register on 21 October 1992 having satisfied the following criteria.

The place is important in demonstrating the evolution or pattern of Queensland's history.

McCowat's Farm is important in demonstrating the development of the sugar industry in north Queensland, particularly in the Johnstone district.

The place demonstrates rare, uncommon or endangered aspects of Queensland's cultural heritage.

The combination of main residence, cane barracks, early workers cottage and remnant rainforest vegetation represent a rare, uncommon or endangered aspect of Queensland's cultural heritage.

The place is important in demonstrating the principal characteristics of a particular class of cultural places.

The complex of farm buildings, specifically the residence, cottage, implement shed and cane barracks, demonstrate the principal characteristics of sugar cane farms.

The place is important because of its aesthetic significance.

The place has aesthetic value, in particular the high-set Queensland bungalow style residence and the surrounding remnant rainforest vegetation.
