= Pantydia metaphaea =

Scientific classification
- Kingdom: Animalia
- Phylum: Arthropoda
- Class: Insecta
- Order: Lepidoptera
- Superfamily: Noctuoidea
- Family: Erebidae
- Genus: Pantydia
- Species: P. metaphaea

Binomial name
- Pantydia metaphaea (Hampson, 1912)

Synonyms
- Isoura metaphaea Hampson, 1912

Species of moth

Pantydia metaphaea is a species of moth of the family Erebidae. It is found in Sri Lanka, the Philippines, Borneo, Sumatra and Australia, where it has been recorded from Queensland.
