= Gmelina hainanensis =

Conservation status
- Vulnerable (IUCN 2.3)

Scientific classification
- Kingdom: Plantae
- Clade: Tracheophytes
- Clade: Angiosperms
- Clade: Eudicots
- Clade: Asterids
- Order: Lamiales
- Family: Lamiaceae
- Genus: Gmelina
- Species: G. hainanensis

Binomial name
- Gmelina hainanensis Oliver

Species of tree

Gmelina hainanensis is a species of tree in the family Lamiaceae. It is a medium-sized tree, up to 15 metres (49 ft) tall, growing on open grassy hillsides and sparse forests. It is found in southern China (Hainan Island, and the mainland provinces Guangdong, Guangxi as well as southern Jiangxi) and in Vietnam.

Gmelina hainanensis provides fine timber. It is threatened by logging and habitat loss. It is under Class II National Protection in China.
