= Pantydia bicolora =

Scientific classification
- Domain: Eukaryota
- Kingdom: Animalia
- Phylum: Arthropoda
- Class: Insecta
- Order: Lepidoptera
- Superfamily: Noctuoidea
- Family: Erebidae
- Genus: Pantydia
- Species: P. bicolora

Binomial name
- Pantydia bicolora (Bethune-Baker, 1906)

Synonyms
- Amphipyra bicolora Bethune-Baker, 1906

Species of moth

Pantydia bicolora is a species of moth of the family Erebidae. It is found on New Guinea.
