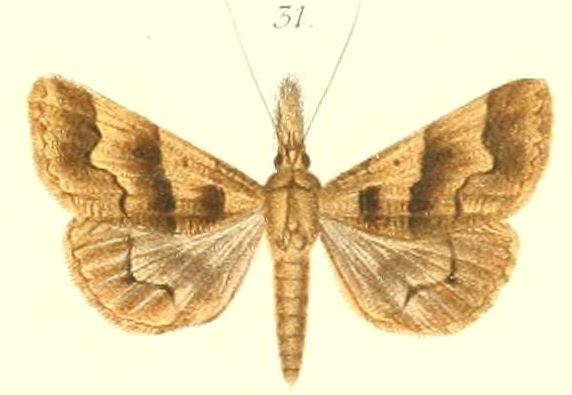
- Ophyx crinipes

Scientific classification
- Kingdom: Animalia
- Phylum: Arthropoda
- Class: Insecta
- Order: Lepidoptera
- Superfamily: Noctuoidea
- Family: Erebidae
- Subfamily: Erebinae
- Genus: Ophyx; Guenée in Boisduval & Guenée, 1852

Synonyms
- Hirsutipes Bethune-Baker, 1906; Lasiopoderes Bethune-Baker, 1906; Pseudophyx Bethune-Baker, 1906; Sinariola Bethune-Baker, 1906; Cyttaralopha Bethune-Baker, 1908; Temnoptera Bethune-Baker, 1908; Clytomorpha Turner, 1932

= Ophyx =

Genus of moths

Ophyx is a genus of moths of the family Erebidae.

== Species ==
- Ophyx bethunei Holloway, 1984
- Ophyx bilinea Holloway, 1984
- Ophyx chionopasta (Hampson, 1926)
- Ophyx crinipes (Felder & Rogenhofer 1874) (Indonesia, Papua New Guinea)
- Ophyx deformata Holloway, 1984
- Ophyx elliptica Holloway, 1984
- Ophyx eurrhoa Lower, 1903 (Australia)
- Ophyx excisa (Hulstaert, 1924)
- Ophyx inextrema (Prout, 1926)
- Ophyx loxographa (Bethune-Baker, 1908)
- Ophyx maculosus Holloway, 1979
- Ophyx meeki (Bethune-Baker, 1908)
- Ophyx ochroptera Guenée, 1852 (Australia)
- Ophyx owgarra (Bethune-Baker, 1906)
- Ophyx prereducta Holloway, 1984
- Ophyx pseudoptera (Lower, 1903) (Australia)
- Ophyx reflexa Holloway, 1984
- Ophyx striata (Hampson, 1926)
- Ophyx talesea Holloway, 1984
- Ophyx triangulata Holloway, 1984

== Former species ==
- Ophyx pratti (Bethune-Baker, 1906)
- Ophyx trifasciata (Swinhoe, 1905)
