= Pantydia andersoni =

Scientific classification
- Domain: Eukaryota
- Kingdom: Animalia
- Phylum: Arthropoda
- Class: Insecta
- Order: Lepidoptera
- Superfamily: Noctuoidea
- Family: Erebidae
- Genus: Pantydia
- Species: P. andersoni

Binomial name
- Pantydia andersoni (Felder & Rogenhofer, 1874)

Synonyms
- Ophiusa andersoni Felder & Rogenhofer, 1874

Species of moth

Pantydia andersoni is a species of moth of the family Erebidae first described by Rudolf Felder and Alois Friedrich Rogenhofer in 1874. It is found in South Africa and Zambia.
