= Pantydia klossi =

Scientific classification
- Domain: Eukaryota
- Kingdom: Animalia
- Phylum: Arthropoda
- Class: Insecta
- Order: Lepidoptera
- Superfamily: Noctuoidea
- Family: Erebidae
- Genus: Pantydia
- Species: P. klossi

Binomial name
- Pantydia klossi (Rothschild, 1915)

Synonyms
- Paranympha klossi Rothschild, 1915

Species of moth

Pantydia klossi is a species of moth of the family Erebidae. It is found in Western New Guinea in Indonesia and in Papua New Guinea.
