= Ophyx bethunei =

Scientific classification
- Kingdom: Animalia
- Phylum: Arthropoda
- Clade: Pancrustacea
- Class: Insecta
- Order: Lepidoptera
- Superfamily: Noctuoidea
- Family: Erebidae
- Genus: Ophyx
- Species: O. bethunei

Binomial name
- Ophyx bethunei Holloway, 1984

Synonyms
- Lasiopoderes pratti Bethune-Baker, 1906 (preocc. Pseudophyx pratti Bethune-Baker, 1906)

Species of moth

Ophyx bethunei is a moth of the family Erebidae first described by Jeremy Daniel Holloway in 1984. It is found on New Guinea. The habitat consists of mountainous areas.
