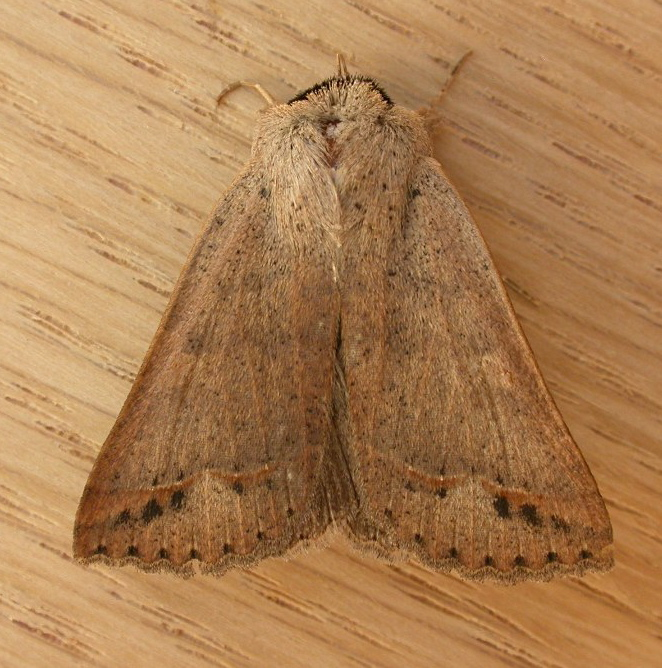

Scientific classification
- Kingdom: Animalia
- Phylum: Arthropoda
- Class: Insecta
- Order: Lepidoptera
- Superfamily: Noctuoidea
- Family: Erebidae
- Genus: Pantydia
- Species: P. sparsa

Binomial name
- Pantydia sparsa Guenée, 1852

Synonyms
- Toxocampa orthosiodes Walker, 1865; Pantydia recondita Walker, 1858

= Pantydia sparsa =

A species of moth in the Erebidae family

Species of moth

Pantydia sparsa is a moth of the family Erebidae. It is found in Queensland and on Norfolk Island. This species was introduced to New Zealand in 2004.

The wingspan is about 40 mm.

The larvae feed on a wide range of plants, including Medicago sativa, Dillwynia ericifolia and Exocarpus aphyllus.

== Gallery ==
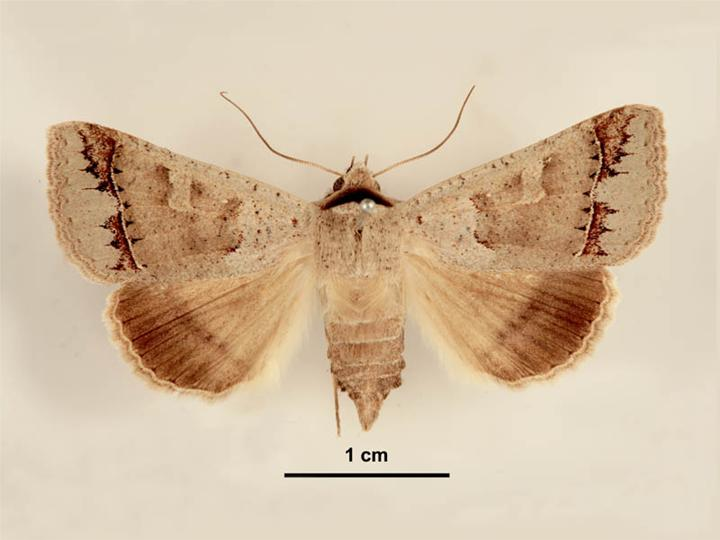
Female, dorsal view

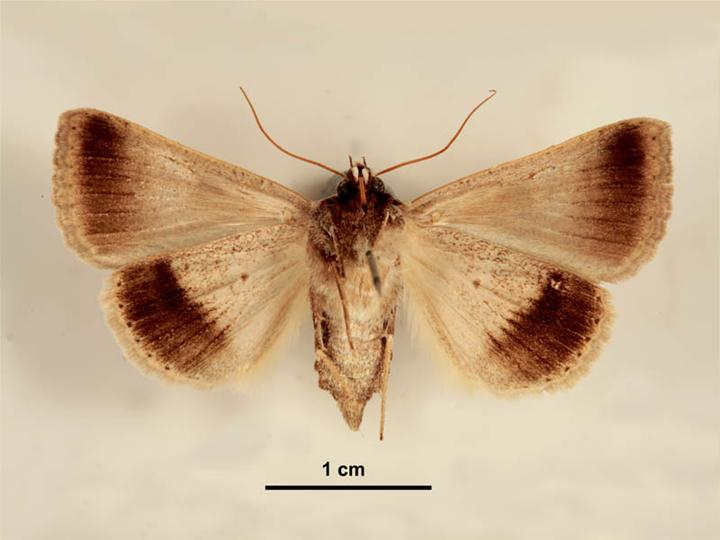
Female, ventral view

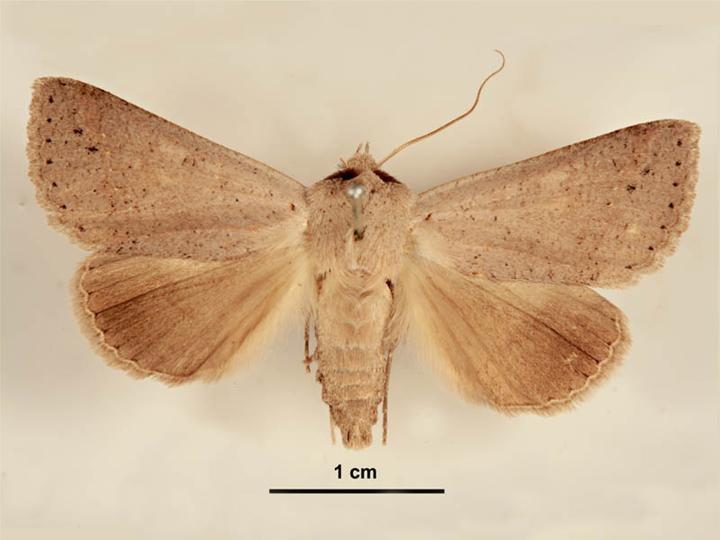
Male, dorsal view

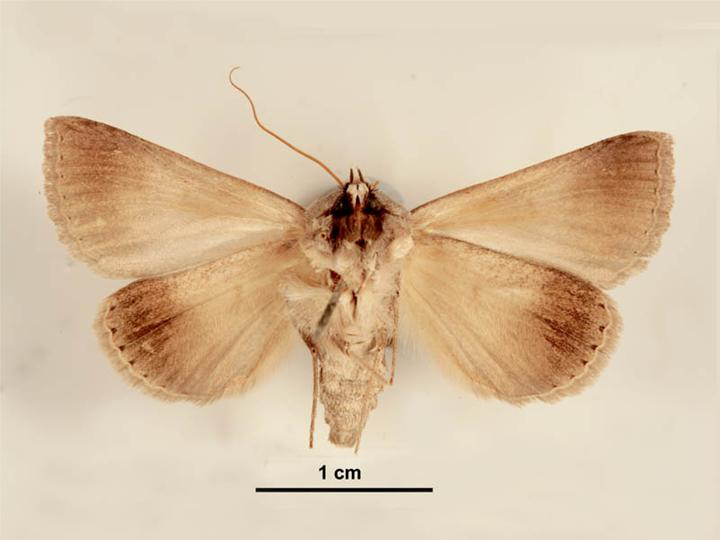
Male, ventral view
