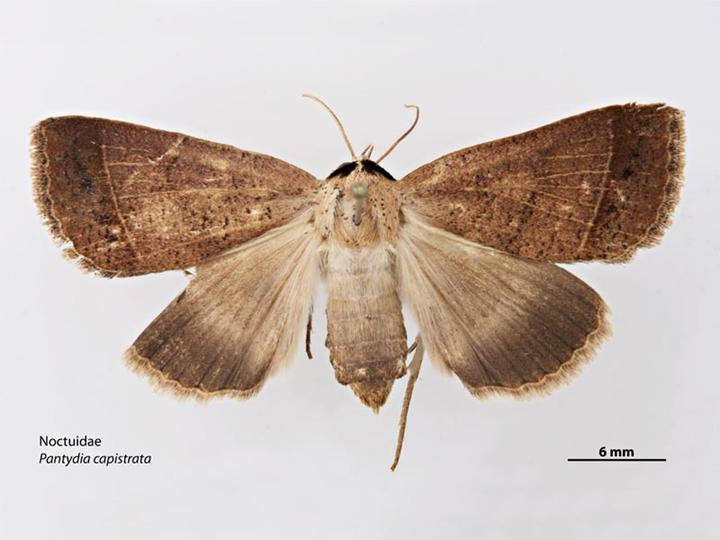
- Dorsal view
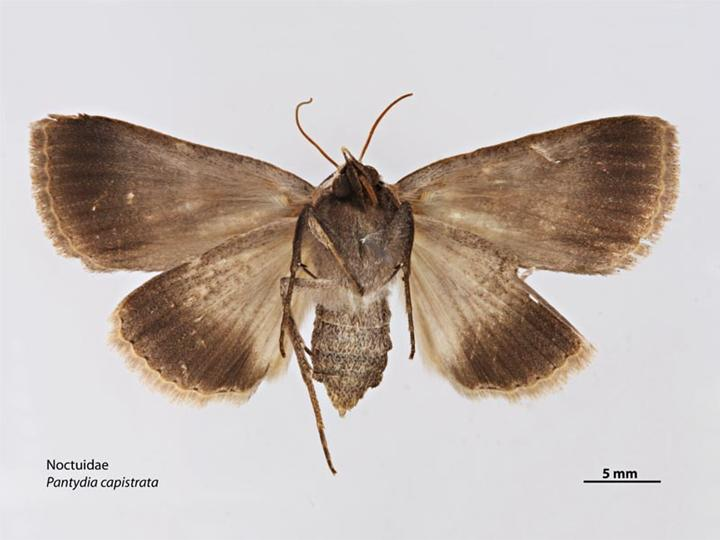
- Ventral view

Scientific classification
- Domain: Eukaryota
- Kingdom: Animalia
- Phylum: Arthropoda
- Class: Insecta
- Order: Lepidoptera
- Superfamily: Noctuoidea
- Family: Erebidae
- Genus: Pantydia
- Species: P. capistrata

Binomial name
- Pantydia capistrata Lucas, 1894

= Pantydia capistrata =

Species of moth

Pantydia capistrata is a moth of the family Erebidae. It is found in Fiji, New Guinea and Australia, including New South Wales and Queensland.

== Description ==
The wingspan is about 40 mm. Adults are fawn.
