= Ophyx excisa =

Scientific classification
- Domain: Eukaryota
- Kingdom: Animalia
- Phylum: Arthropoda
- Class: Insecta
- Order: Lepidoptera
- Superfamily: Noctuoidea
- Family: Erebidae
- Genus: Ophyx
- Species: O. excisa

Binomial name
- Ophyx excisa (Hulstaert, 1924)

Synonyms
- Hirsutipes excisa Hulstaert, 1924

Species of moth

Ophyx excisa is a moth of the family Erebidae first described by Gustaaf Hulstaert in 1924. It is found in Papua, Indonesia. The habitat consists of hot lowland forests.
