= Gmelina australis =

Scientific classification
- Kingdom: Plantae
- Clade: Tracheophytes
- Clade: Angiosperms
- Clade: Eudicots
- Clade: Asterids
- Order: Lamiales
- Family: Lamiaceae
- Genus: Gmelina
- Species: G. australis

Binomial name
- Gmelina australis de Kok

Species of plant

Gmelina australis is a species of plant in the family Lamiaceae. A tree of moist and swampy areas, sometimes on the margins of rainforests. It is found growing in the Northern Territory and Western Australia in tropical Australia. This plant was previously known by a misapplied name Gmelina schlechteri.
