= Ophyx meeki =

Scientific classification
- Domain: Eukaryota
- Kingdom: Animalia
- Phylum: Arthropoda
- Class: Insecta
- Order: Lepidoptera
- Superfamily: Noctuoidea
- Family: Erebidae
- Genus: Ophyx
- Species: O. meeki

Binomial name
- Ophyx meeki (Bethune-Baker, 1908)

Synonyms
- Temnoptera meeki Bethune-Baker, 1908

Species of moth

Ophyx meeki is a moth of the family Erebidae. It is found in Papua New Guinea.
