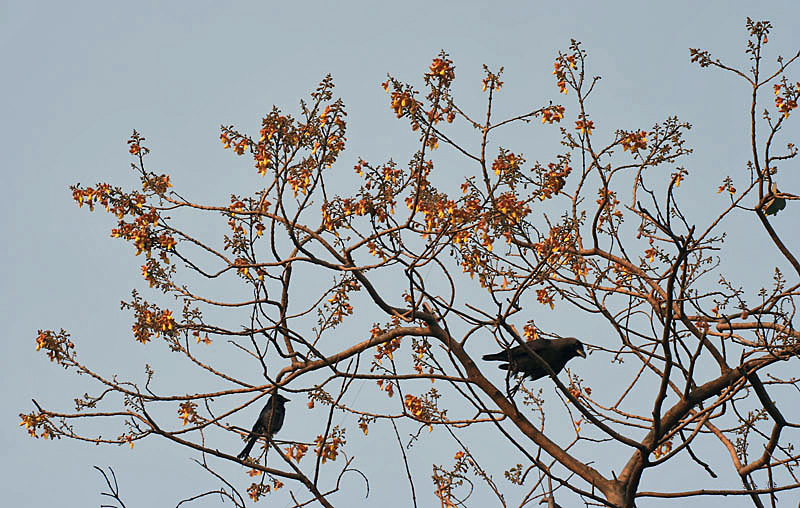
- Gmelina arborea

Scientific classification
- Kingdom: Plantae
- Clade: Tracheophytes
- Clade: Angiosperms
- Clade: Eudicots
- Clade: Asterids
- Order: Lamiales
- Family: Lamiaceae
- Subfamily: Viticoideae
- Genus: Gmelina; L.

= Gmelina =

Genus of flowering plants

Gmelina is a genus of plants in the family Lamiaceae. It consists of about 35 species, native to Australia, Southeast Asia, India, New Guinea and New Caledonia. Some species such as G. arborea have been planted and/or become naturalised in India, Africa and Australia. It was named by Carl Linnaeus in honour of botanist Johann Georg Gmelin.

== Species ==
This listing draws from de Kok's 2012 revision of this genus, and additional sources including IPNI, APNI and the Flora of China.

- Gmelina arborea Roxb. ex Sm. – India, Bangladesh, Pakistan, Sri Lanka, Burma, Thailand, Vietnam, S. China, (mainland southeast Asia region)
- Gmelina asiatica L. – India, Sri Lanka, Burma, China, Thailand, Vietnam, (southeast Asia)
- Gmelina australis de Kok – Northern Territory, Australia
- Gmelina basifilum de Kok – New Guinea, New Britain
- Gmelina chinensis Benth. – S. China, Laos, Vietnam
- Gmelina dalrympleana (F.Muell.) H.J.Lam – Wet tropics & Cape York, Australia, New Guinea
- Gmelina delavayana Dop – Sichuan & Yunnan, China endemic
- Gmelina elliptica Sm. – India, Burma, S. China, Vietnam, Thailand, Malaysia, Singapore, Philippines, Indonesia, (SE. Asia)
- Gmelina evoluta (Däniker) Mabb. – New Caledonia
- Gmelina fasciculiflora Benth., Northern white beech – Wet Tropics Australia
- Gmelina hainanensis Oliver – S. China, Vietnam
- Gmelina hollrungii de Kok – Moluccas, New Guinea, NT, N. Qld & WA, Solomon Is.
- Gmelina lecomtei Dop – Yunnan, Kwantung, Hainan, China, Laos, Vietnam
- Gmelina ledermannii H.J.Lam – New Guinea
- Gmelina leichhardtii (F.Muell.) Benth., White beech – eastern NSW & QLD, Australia
- Gmelina lepidota Scheff. – Moluccas, New Guinea, New Britain
- Gmelina lignum-vitreum Guillaumin – endangered New Caledonia endemic
- Gmelina magnifica Mabb. – New Caledonia
- Gmelina moluccana (Blume) Backer ex K.Heyne – Moluccas, New Guinea, Solomon Is.
- Gmelina neocaledonica S.Moore – New Caledonia
- Gmelina palawensis H.J.Lam

- subsp. celebica (Moldenke) de Kok – Sulawesi
- subsp. palawensis – Palau Is.

- Gmelina papuana Bakh. – New Guinea
- Gmelina peltata de Kok – Solomon Is.
- Gmelina philippensis Cham. – Philippines, Cambodia, Vietnam, Thailand
- Gmelina racemosa (Lour.) Merr.; syn.: G. hainanensis Oliver – Hainan Island & southern China, Vietnam
- Gmelina salomonensis Bakh. – Solomon Is. endemic
- Gmelina schlechteri H.J.Lam – New Guinea
- Gmelina sessilis C.T.White & W.D.Francis – New Guinea, New Britain
- Gmelina smithii Moldenke – New Guinea
- Gmelina szechwanensis K. Yao – Sichuan China, de Kok did not see the type specimen but considers this within G. philippinensis
- Gmelina tholicola Mabb. – New Caledonia
- Gmelina uniflora Stapf – Borneo endemic
- Gmelina vitiensis (Seem.) A.C.Sm. – Fiji endemic

== Gallery ==
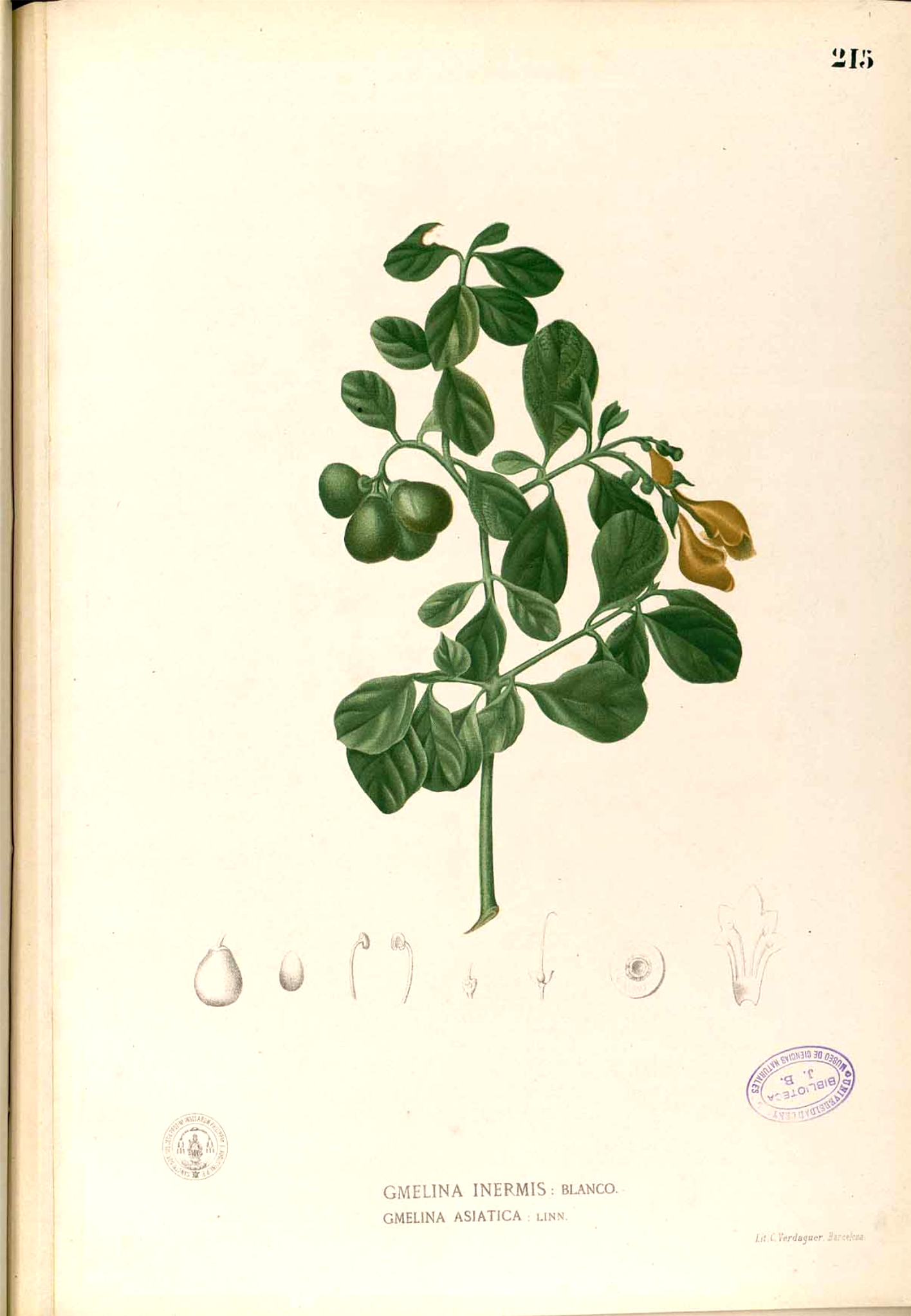
Gmelina villosa painting from "Flora de Filipinas … Gran edicion … Atlas I".

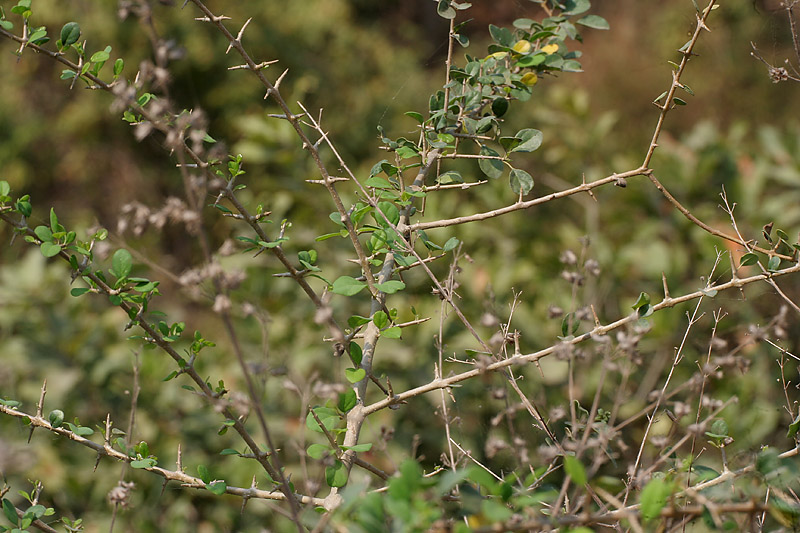
Gmelina asiatica in Kinnerasani Wildlife Sanctuary, Andhra Pradesh, India.

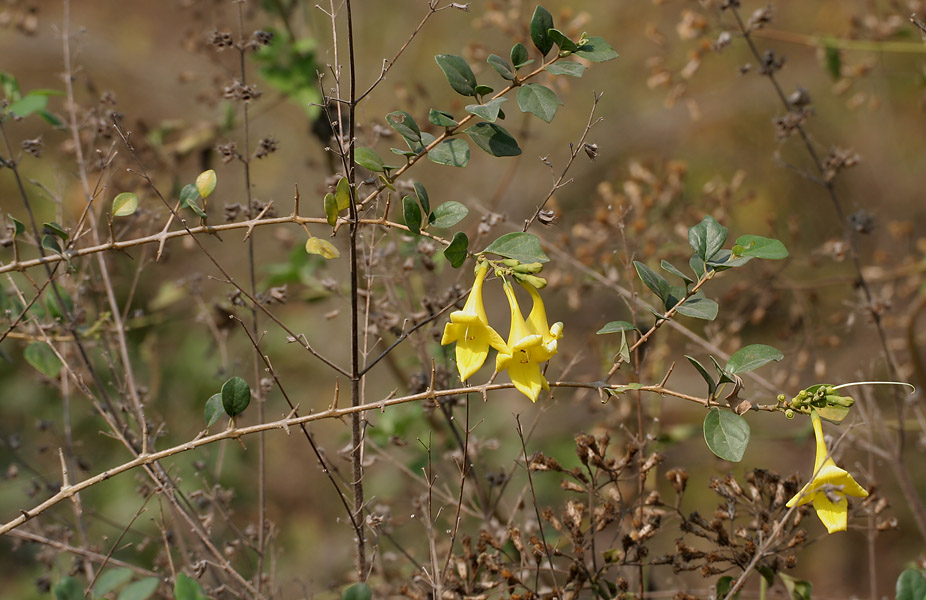
Gmelina asiatica in Kinnerasani Wildlife Sanctuary, Andhra Pradesh, India.

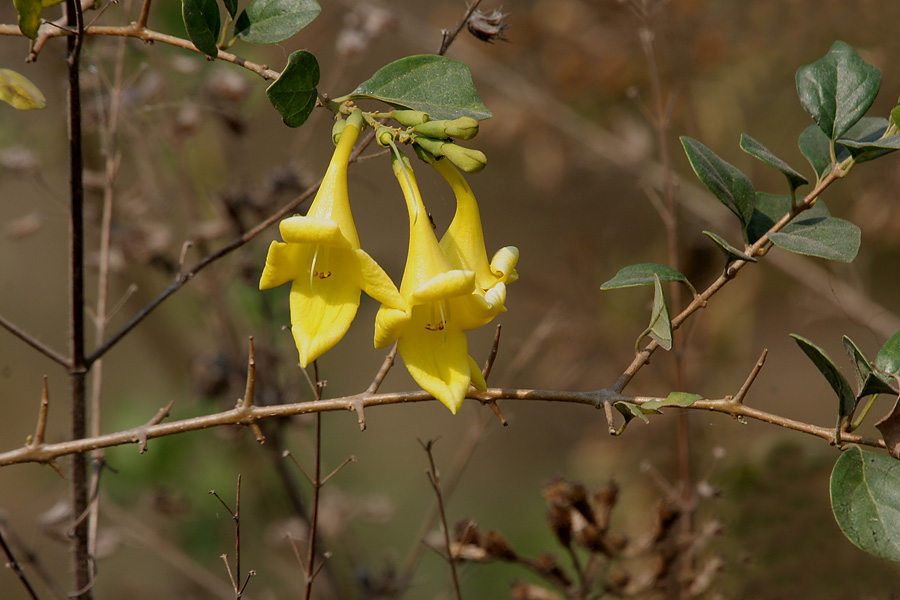
Gmelina asiatica in Kinnerasani Wildlife Sanctuary, Andhra Pradesh, India.

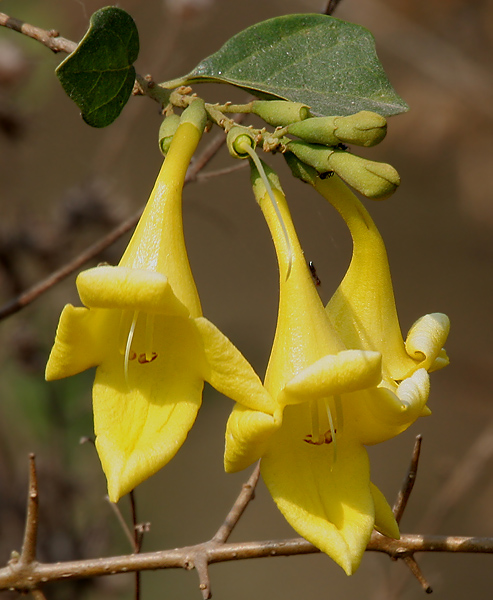
Gmelina asiatica in Kinnerasani Wildlife Sanctuary, Andhra Pradesh, India.

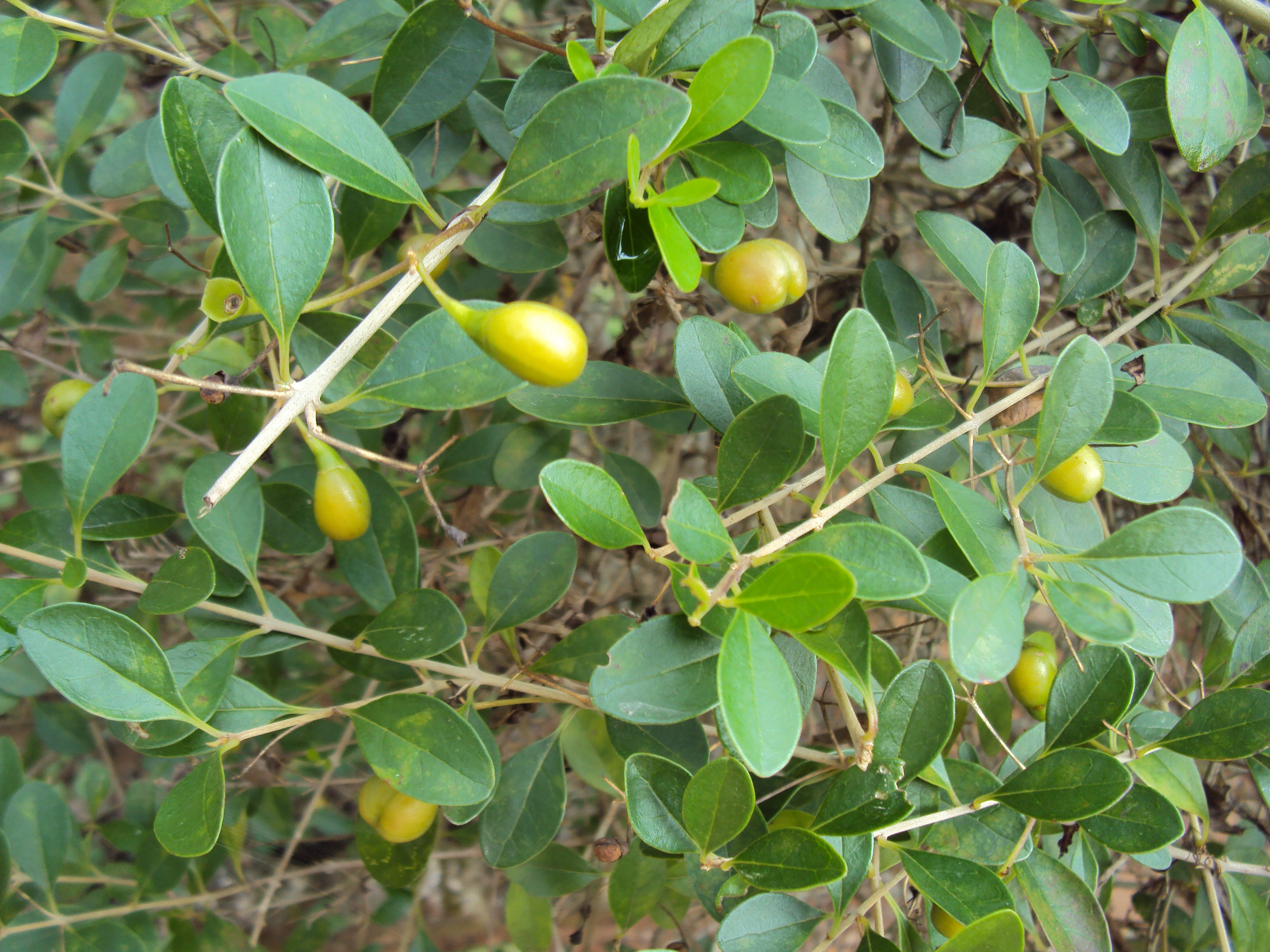
Gmelina asiatica developing fruit, in the botanical garden of Kariyavattam University Campus, Trivandrum
