= Ophyx owgarra =

Scientific classification
- Domain: Eukaryota
- Kingdom: Animalia
- Phylum: Arthropoda
- Class: Insecta
- Order: Lepidoptera
- Superfamily: Noctuoidea
- Family: Erebidae
- Genus: Ophyx
- Species: O. owgarra

Binomial name
- Ophyx owgarra (Bethune-Baker, 1906)

Synonyms
- Sinariola owgarra Bethune-Baker, 1906

Species of moth

Ophyx owgarra is a moth of the family Erebidae first described by George Thomas Bethune-Baker in 1906. It is found in Papua and Papua New Guinea. The habitat consists of mountainous areas.
