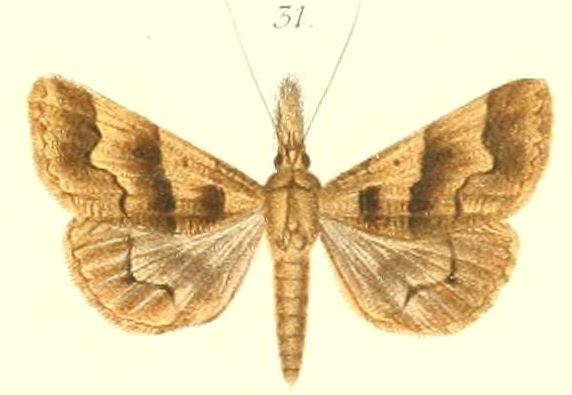

Scientific classification
- Domain: Eukaryota
- Kingdom: Animalia
- Phylum: Arthropoda
- Class: Insecta
- Order: Lepidoptera
- Superfamily: Noctuoidea
- Family: Erebidae
- Genus: Ophyx
- Species: O. crinipes

Binomial name
- Ophyx crinipes (Felder & Rogenhofer 1874)

Synonyms
- Remigia crinipes Felder & Rogenhofer, 1874; Bleptina flocculalis Pagenstecher, 1900; Polydesma graphica Holland, 1900; Hirsutipes intensior Rothschild, 1915; Hypaetra trifasciata Swinhoe, 1905

= Ophyx crinipes =

Species of moth

Ophyx crinipes is a moth of the family Erebidae. It is found in Indonesia and Papua New Guinea.
