= Pantydia dufayi =

Scientific classification
- Domain: Eukaryota
- Kingdom: Animalia
- Phylum: Arthropoda
- Class: Insecta
- Order: Lepidoptera
- Superfamily: Noctuoidea
- Family: Erebidae
- Genus: Pantydia
- Species: P. dufayi

Binomial name
- Pantydia dufayi Laporte, 1975

Species of moth

Pantydia dufayi is a species of moth of the family Erebidae. It is found in Kenya.
