= Ophyx pseudoptera =

Scientific classification
- Domain: Eukaryota
- Kingdom: Animalia
- Phylum: Arthropoda
- Class: Insecta
- Order: Lepidoptera
- Superfamily: Noctuoidea
- Family: Erebidae
- Genus: Ophyx
- Species: O. pseudoptera

Binomial name
- Ophyx pseudoptera (Lower, 1903)

Synonyms
- Hamodes pseudoptera Lower, 1903; Pseudophyx pratti Bethune-Baker, 1906; Pseudophyx callipepla Bethune-Baker, 1916; Clytomorpha psilozona Turner, 1932

Species of moth

Ophyx pseudoptera is a moth of the family Erebidae first described by Oswald Bertram Lower in 1903. It is found in Papua (including Roon Island, Supiori, Biak Island), Papua New Guinea and Australia, where it has been recorded from Queensland. The habitat consists of lowland areas.
