= Ophyx ochroptera =

Scientific classification
- Kingdom: Animalia
- Phylum: Arthropoda
- Class: Insecta
- Order: Lepidoptera
- Superfamily: Noctuoidea
- Family: Erebidae
- Genus: Ophyx
- Species: O. ochroptera

Binomial name
- Ophyx ochroptera Guenée, 1852

Synonyms
- Ophyx bipartita Guenée, 1852; Ophyx dimidiata Guenée, 1852; Ophisma resignans Walker, 1858; Thermesia tenebrica Lucas, 1892

Species of moth

Ophyx ochroptera is a moth of the family Erebidae first described by Achille Guenée in 1852. It is found in Australia, where it has been recorded from Queensland and New South Wales. The habitat consists of rainforests.

The wingspan is about 50 mm. Adults are brown and yellow.

The larvae feed on Ficus macrophylla.
