= Ophyx inextrema =

Scientific classification
- Kingdom: Animalia
- Phylum: Arthropoda
- Clade: Pancrustacea
- Class: Insecta
- Order: Lepidoptera
- Superfamily: Noctuoidea
- Family: Erebidae
- Genus: Ophyx
- Species: O. inextrema

Binomial name
- Ophyx inextrema (Prout, 1926)

Synonyms
- Pseudophyx inextrema Prout, 1926; Ophyx simplicior Holloway, 1984

Species of moth

Ophyx inextrema is a moth of the family Erebidae first described by Prout in 1926. It is found in Papua and on Buru in the Maluku Islands.
