= Gmelina vitiensis =

Conservation status
- Least Concern (IUCN 3.1)

Scientific classification
- Kingdom: Plantae
- Clade: Tracheophytes
- Clade: Angiosperms
- Clade: Eudicots
- Clade: Asterids
- Order: Lamiales
- Family: Lamiaceae
- Genus: Gmelina
- Species: G. vitiensis

Binomial name
- Gmelina vitiensis (Seem.) A.C.Sm.

Species of plant

Gmelina vitiensis is a species of plant in the family Lamiaceae. It is endemic to Fiji.

Rosawa (a common name) is a pale yellow brown colour, "teak like" timber with a fine texture and slightly interlocked grain. Rosawa is a very stable timber.

* Density: 640 kg/m3

* Durability: Durable

* Shrinkage: Low

* It is easy to saw and machine and the greasy nature of the timber enhances working properties.

Uses

* Boat building

* Planking interior and exterior cabin work

* Windows and doorframe sills

* Pattern making

* Carving

* Diving boards

* Decking
