= Ophyx triangulata =

Scientific classification
- Kingdom: Animalia
- Phylum: Arthropoda
- Clade: Pancrustacea
- Class: Insecta
- Order: Lepidoptera
- Superfamily: Noctuoidea
- Family: Erebidae
- Genus: Ophyx
- Species: O. triangulata

Binomial name
- Ophyx triangulata Holloway, 1984

Species of moth

Ophyx triangulata is a moth of the family Erebidae. It is found in Indonesia (Batchian).
