= Garradunga =

- Suburb
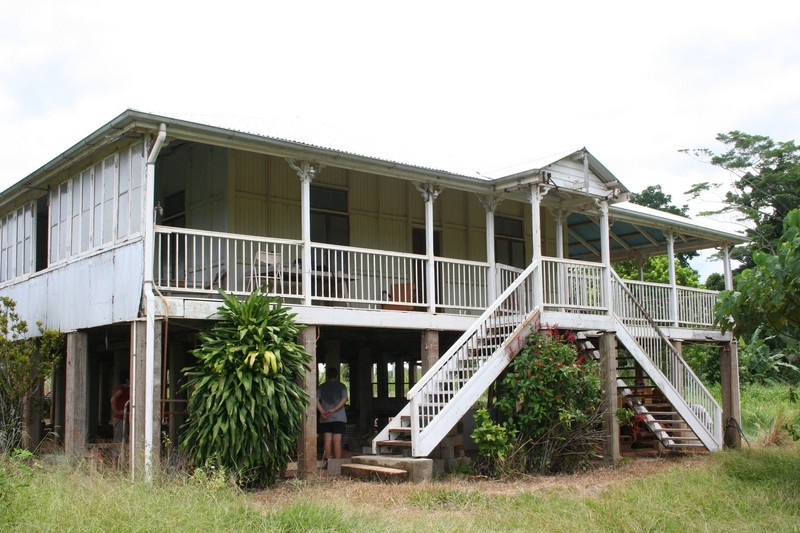
- McCowat's Farm, front view, 2008

- Interactive map of Garradunga
- Coordinates: 17.4591°S 146.0005°E
- Country: Australia
- State: Queensland
- LGA: Cassowary Coast Region
- Location: 12.7 km (7.9 mi) N of Innisfail; 79.6 km (49.5 mi) S of Cairns; 272 km (169 mi) NNW of Townsville; 1,635 km (1,016 mi) NNW of Brisbane

Government
  - State electorate: Hill
  - Federal division: Kennedy

Area
  - Total: 8.1 km^{2} (3.1 sq mi)

Population
  - Total: 170 (2021 census)
  - Density: 21.0/km^{2} (54.4/sq mi)
- Time zone: UTC+10:00 (AEST)
- Postcode: 4860
Suburbs around Garradunga
Eubenangee	Eubenangee	Eubenangee
Eubenangee	Garradunga	Jubilee Heights
Vasa Views	Daradgee	Jubilee Heights

Garradunga is a rural locality in the Cassowary Coast Region, Queensland, Australia. In the 2021 census, Garradunga had a population of 170 people.

== Geography ==
Garradunga is located north of Innisfail.

The North Coast railway line enters from the south (Daradgee) and exits to the west (Eubenangee). Historically, the locality was served by the now-abandoned Garradunga railway station (17.4615°S 145.9941°E).

The land use is predominantly growing sugarcane with some grazing on native vegetation. There is also some rural residential housing.

== History ==
It has been suggested that the locality takes its name from its railway station, which was named on 10 October 1918 by the Queensland Railways Department, using an Aboriginal word meaning feasting place on a ridge. However, the name was already in use in the area prior to that time.

Garradunga Provisional School opened circa June 1902 and closed later that year due to low student numbers. It reopened in 1903 but low student numbers resulted in it being closed permanently in 1904.

Garradunga Post Office opened on 1 April 1925 (a receiving office had been open from 1923, and between 1901 and 1906).

== Demographics ==
In the 2011 census, Garradunga had a population of 329 people.

In the 2016 census, Garradunga had a population of 142 people.

In the 2021 census, Garradunga had a population of 170 people.

== Heritage listings ==
Garradunga has a number of heritage-listed sites, including:

- McCowat Road: McCowat's Farm

== Education ==
There are no schools in Garradunga. The nearest government primary school is Goondi State School in Goondi Bend to the south. The nearest government secondary school is Innisfail State College in Innisfail Estate to the south-east.
