= Ophyx chionopasta =

Scientific classification
- Kingdom: Animalia
- Phylum: Arthropoda
- Class: Insecta
- Order: Lepidoptera
- Superfamily: Noctuoidea
- Family: Erebidae
- Genus: Ophyx
- Species: O. chionopasta

Binomial name
- Ophyx chionopasta (Hampson, 1926)

Synonyms
- Mecodina chionopasta Hampson, 1926

Species of moth

Ophyx chionopasta is a moth in the family Erebidae. Endemic to Papua, Indonesia, it was first described by George Hampson in 1926.
