= Gmelina lignum-vitreum =

Conservation status
- Endangered (IUCN 3.1)

Scientific classification
- Kingdom: Plantae
- Clade: Tracheophytes
- Clade: Angiosperms
- Clade: Eudicots
- Clade: Asterids
- Order: Lamiales
- Family: Lamiaceae
- Genus: Gmelina
- Species: G. lignum-vitreum

Binomial name
- Gmelina lignum-vitreum Guillaumin

Species of plant

Gmelina lignum-vitreum is a species of flowering plant in the family Lamiaceae. It is a tree endemic to the Forêt de la Thy in southern New Caledonia.

It grows in dense lowland rain forest on ultramafic and volcano-sedimentary substrates from 340 to 370 metres elevation.

The species was named by André Guillaumin in 1952.
