= Ophyx deformata =

Scientific classification
- Kingdom: Animalia
- Phylum: Arthropoda
- Clade: Pancrustacea
- Class: Insecta
- Order: Lepidoptera
- Superfamily: Noctuoidea
- Family: Erebidae
- Genus: Ophyx
- Species: O. deformata

Binomial name
- Ophyx deformata Holloway, 1984

Species of moth

Ophyx deformata is a moth of the family Erebidae. It is found in Papua New Guinea.
