= Ophyx maculosus =

Scientific classification
- Kingdom: Animalia
- Phylum: Arthropoda
- Clade: Pancrustacea
- Class: Insecta
- Order: Lepidoptera
- Superfamily: Noctuoidea
- Family: Erebidae
- Genus: Ophyx
- Species: O. maculosus

Binomial name
- Ophyx maculosus Holloway, 1979

Species of moth

Ophyx maculosus is a moth of the family Erebidae. It is found on New Caledonia.
