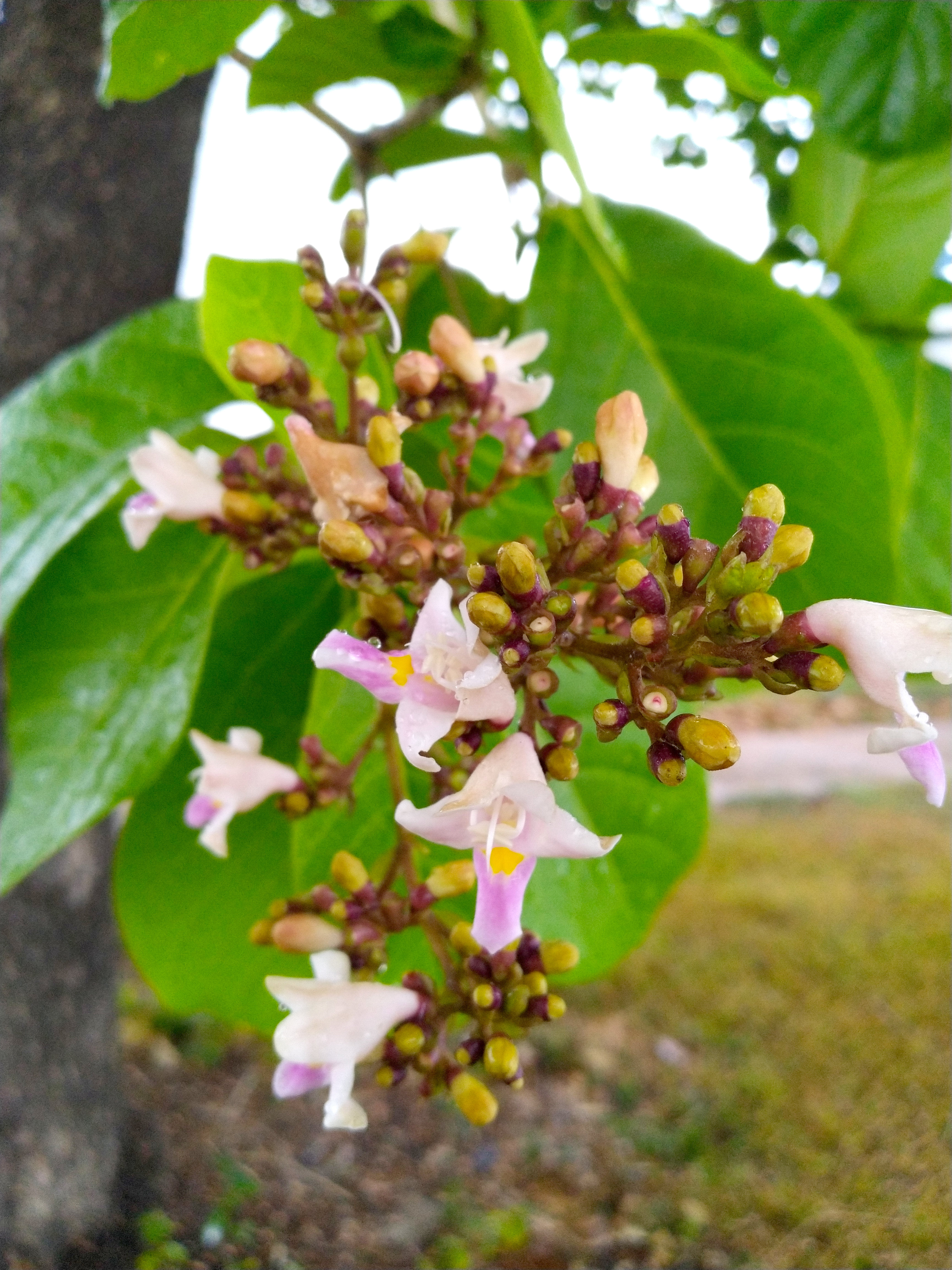

Scientific classification
- Kingdom: Plantae
- Clade: Embryophytes
- Clade: Tracheophytes
- Clade: Spermatophytes
- Clade: Angiosperms
- Clade: Eudicots
- Clade: Asterids
- Order: Lamiales
- Family: Lamiaceae
- Genus: Gmelina
- Species: G. dalrympleana

Binomial name
- Gmelina dalrympleana (F.Muell.) H.J.Lam

Synonyms
- Vitex dalrympleana F.Muell.

= Gmelina dalrympleana =

Species of plant

Gmelina dalrympleana is a species of plant in the family Lamiaceae. A tree of moist and swampy areas, sometimes on the margins of rainforests. It is found growing in Papua New Guinea and tropical Queensland, in Australia.
