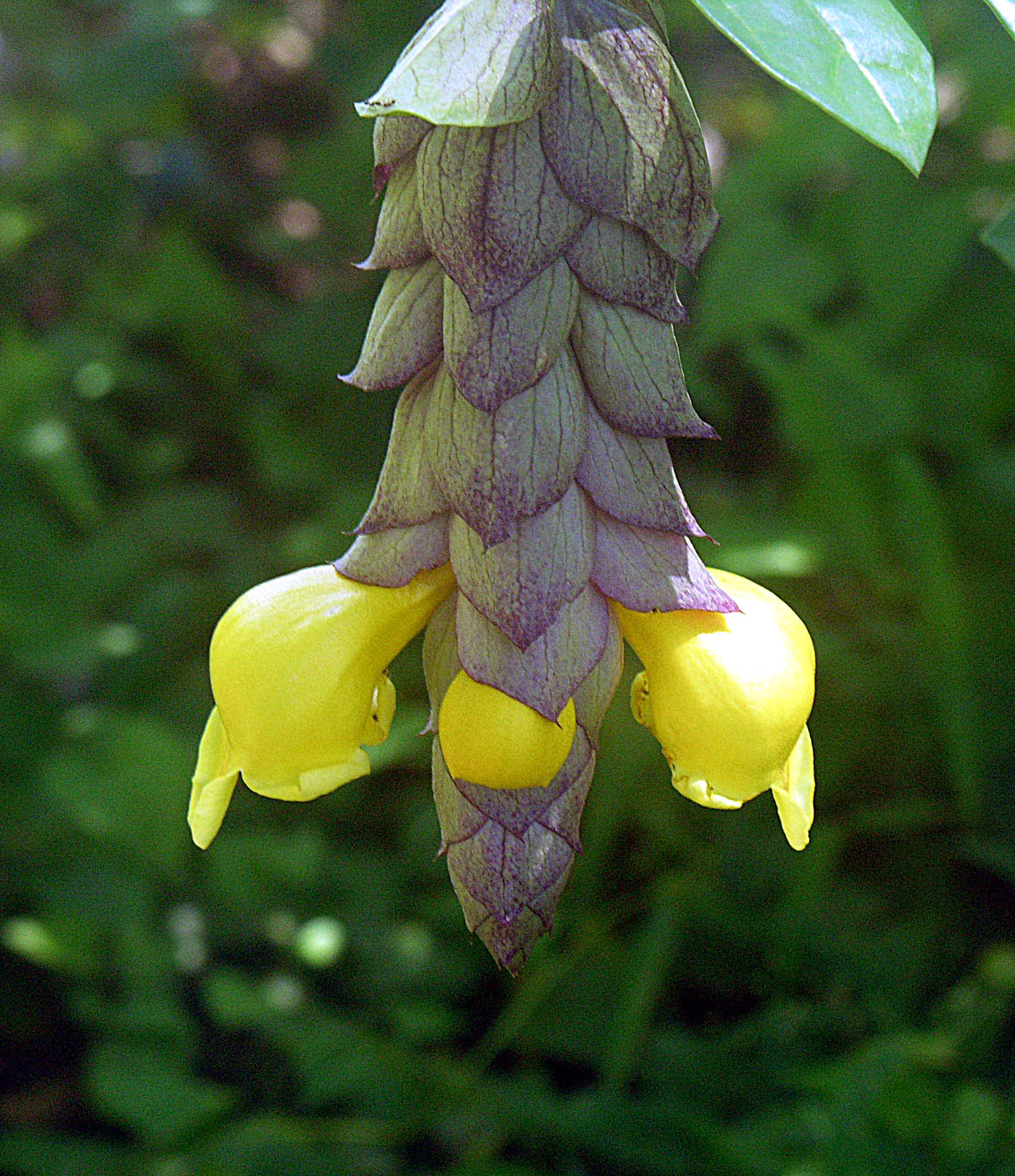
- Flower

Scientific classification
- Kingdom: Plantae
- Clade: Tracheophytes
- Clade: Angiosperms
- Clade: Eudicots
- Clade: Asterids
- Order: Lamiales
- Family: Lamiaceae
- Genus: Gmelina
- Species: G. philippensis

Binomial name
- Gmelina philippensis Cham.

Synonyms
- Gmelina asiatica var. philippensis (Cham.) Bakh. Gmelina finlaysoniana Wall. ex Kuntze [Illegitimate] Gmelina finlaysoniana Wall. Gmelina finlaysoniana f. colorata Kuntze; Gmelina finlaysoniana var. silvestris Kuntze; Gmelina finlaysoniana f. viridibracteata Kuntze; Gmelina hystrix Schult. ex Kurz; Gmelina philippensis f. colorata (Kuntze) Moldenke; Gmelina philippensis f. viridibracteata (Kuntze) Moldenke

= Gmelina philippensis =

Species of flowering plant

Gmelina philippensis is a plant species in the family Lamiaceae (but was previously placed in the Verbenaceae). No subspecies are listed in the Catalogue of Life.

== Gallery ==
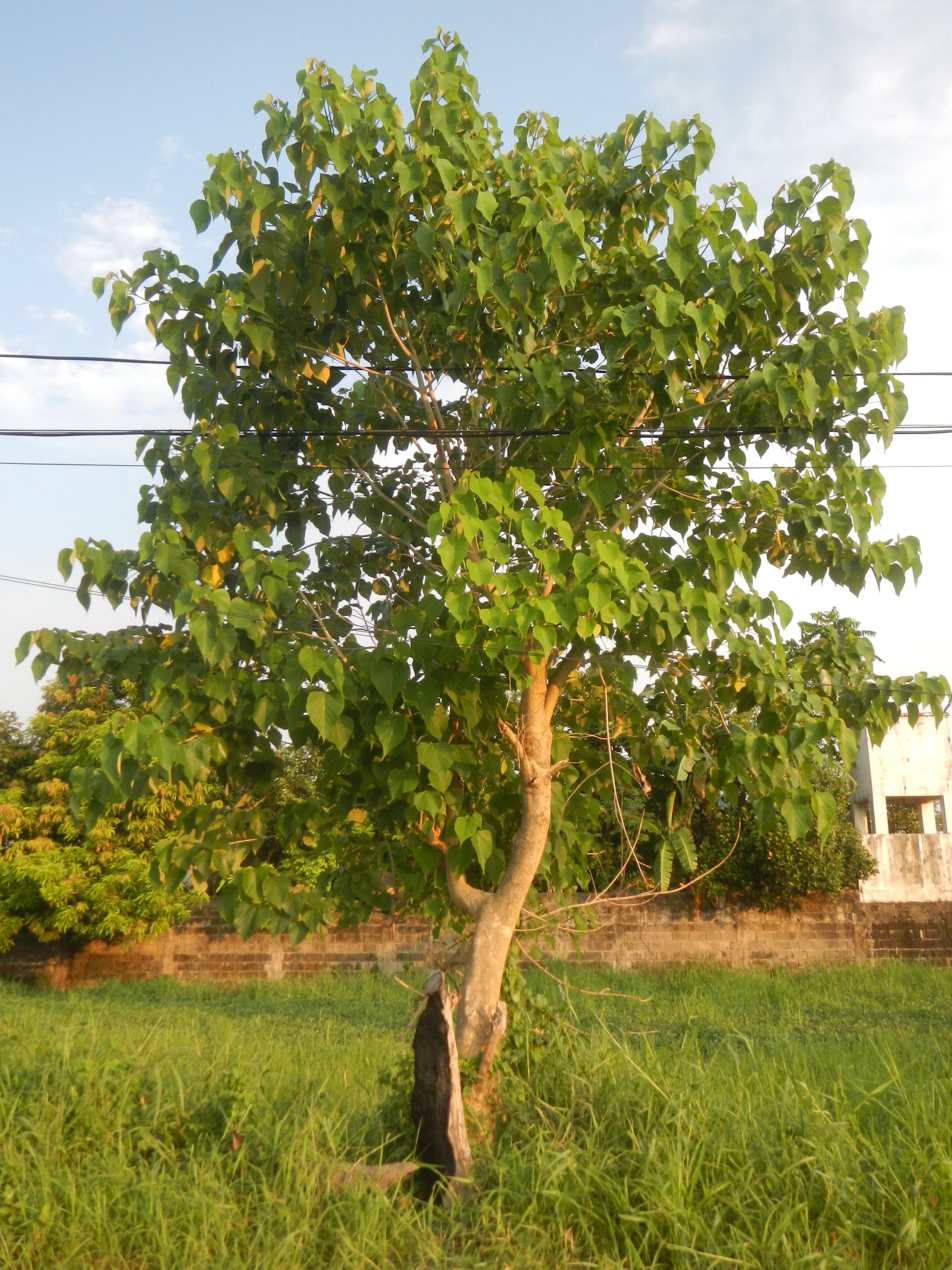

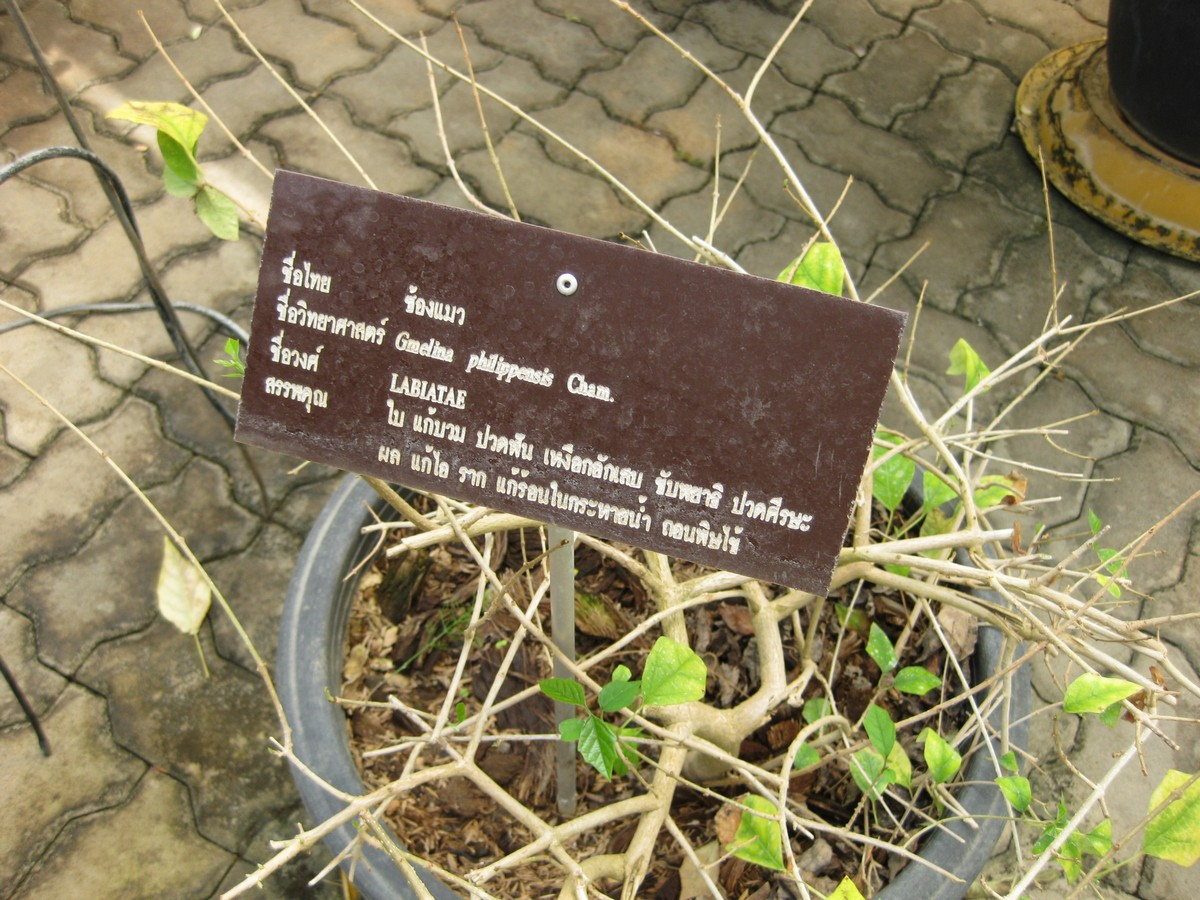

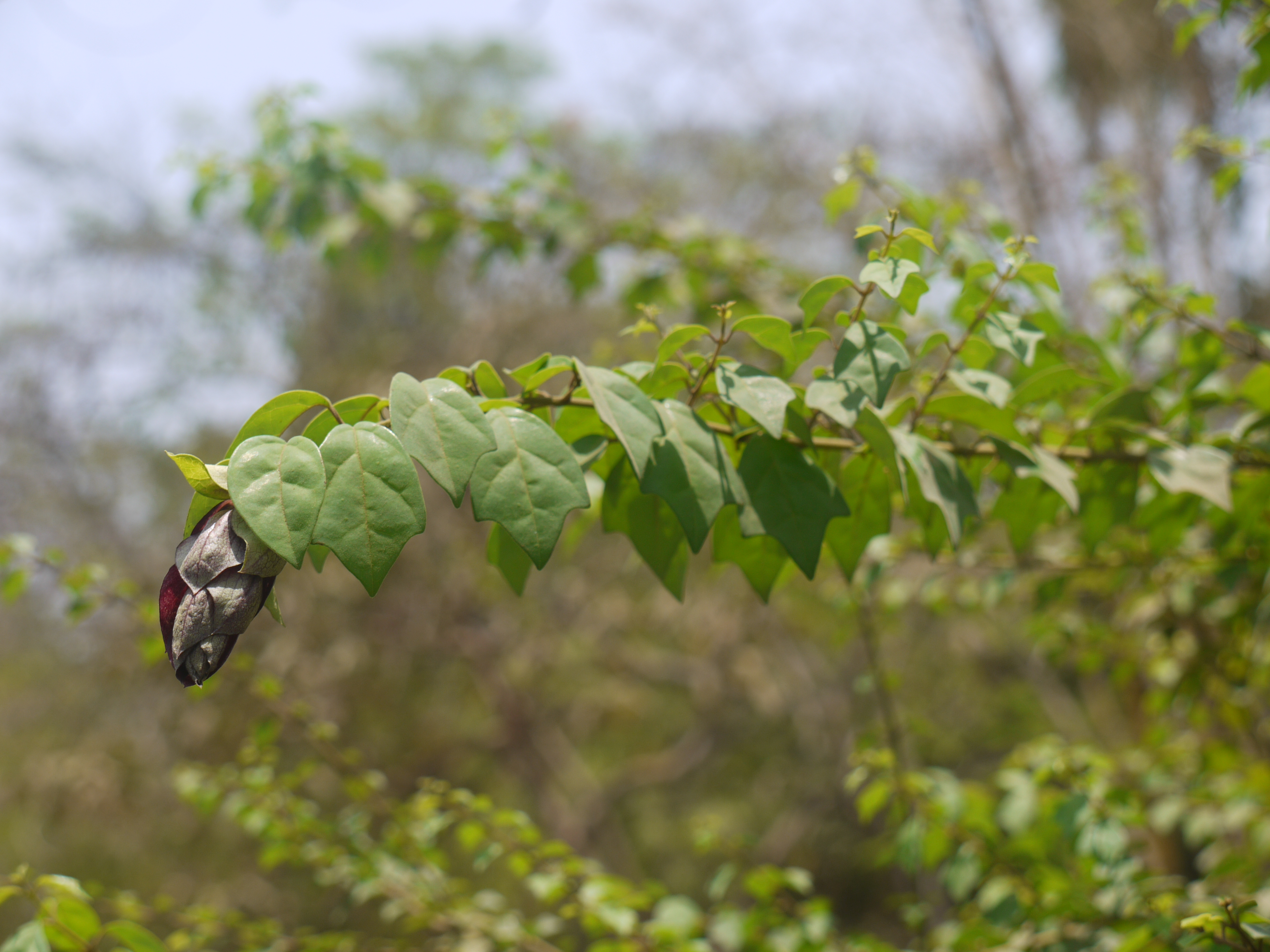
