= Ophyx striata =

Scientific classification
- Kingdom: Animalia
- Phylum: Arthropoda
- Clade: Pancrustacea
- Class: Insecta
- Order: Lepidoptera
- Superfamily: Noctuoidea
- Family: Erebidae
- Genus: Ophyx
- Species: O. striata

Binomial name
- Ophyx striata (Hampson, 1926)

Synonyms
- Mecodina striata Hampson, 1926

Species of moth

Ophyx striata was a moth of the family Erebidae first described by George Hampson in 1926. It is found in Papua, Indonesia, where it has only been recorded from Fakfak, the type locality.
