= Pantydia diemeni =

Scientific classification
- Kingdom: Animalia
- Phylum: Arthropoda
- Class: Insecta
- Order: Lepidoptera
- Superfamily: Noctuoidea
- Family: Erebidae
- Genus: Pantydia
- Species: P. diemeni

Binomial name
- Pantydia diemeni Guenée, 1852

Species of moth

Pantydia diemeni, the gap-lined pantydia, is a species of moth of the family Erebidae. It is found in Australia, where it has been recorded from Tasmania, Queensland, New South Wales, the Australian Capital Territory, Victoria and Western Australia.

The wingspan is about 30 mm. The forewings are pale brown, with a pale thin submarginal line and variable dark areas. The hindwings are uniform pale brown.
