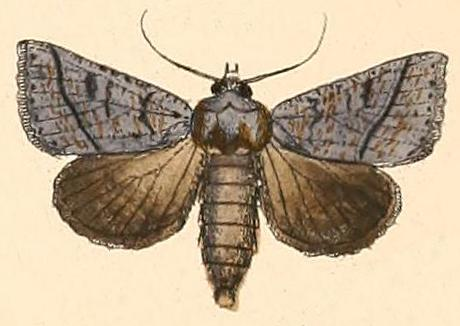

Scientific classification
- Kingdom: Animalia
- Phylum: Arthropoda
- Class: Insecta
- Order: Lepidoptera
- Superfamily: Noctuoidea
- Family: Erebidae
- Genus: Pantydia
- Species: P. canescens

Binomial name
- Pantydia canescens Walker, 1869

Synonyms
- Pachnobia australiae Felder & Rogenhofer, 1874

= Pantydia canescens =

Species of moth

Pantydia canescens is a species of moth of the family Erebidae. It is found in Australia, where it has been recorded from Victoria.

The moth's wingspan is about 30 mm. Its forewings are brown with a pale thin submarginal line, as well as a few black spots, and its hindwings are uniform pale brown.
