= Pantydia scissa =

Scientific classification
- Kingdom: Animalia
- Phylum: Arthropoda
- Class: Insecta
- Order: Lepidoptera
- Superfamily: Noctuoidea
- Family: Erebidae
- Genus: Pantydia
- Species: P. scissa

Binomial name
- Pantydia scissa (Walker, 1865)

Synonyms
- Rhiscipha scissa Walker, 1865

Species of moth

Pantydia scissa is a species of moth of the family Erebidae. It is found in Cameroon, the Democratic Republic of the Congo (Orientale, North Kivu), Kenya, Nigeria, South Africa, Uganda, Zambia and Zimbabwe.
