= Ophyx eurrhoa =

Scientific classification
- Domain: Eukaryota
- Kingdom: Animalia
- Phylum: Arthropoda
- Class: Insecta
- Order: Lepidoptera
- Superfamily: Noctuoidea
- Family: Erebidae
- Genus: Ophyx
- Species: O. eurrhoa

Binomial name
- Ophyx eurrhoa (Lower, 1903)

Synonyms
- Avitta eurrhoa Lower, 1903; Pantydia dochmosticha Turner, 1933

Species of moth

Ophyx eurrhoa is a moth of the family Erebidae. It is found in Australia, where it has been recorded from Queensland.

The forewings are brown with a fuzzy dark crossline and a dark spot near the wingtip.
