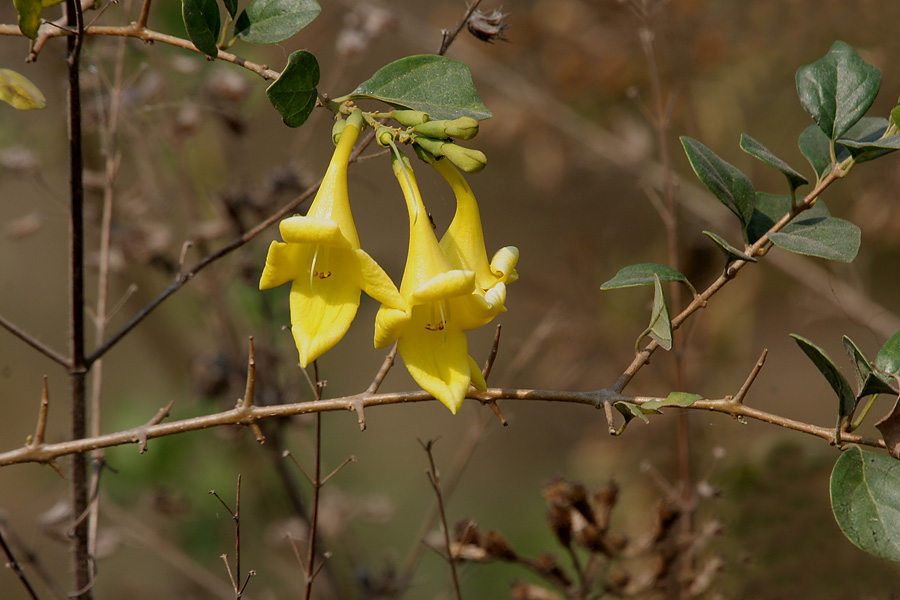
- Flower

Scientific classification
- Kingdom: Plantae
- Clade: Tracheophytes
- Clade: Angiosperms
- Clade: Eudicots
- Clade: Asterids
- Order: Lamiales
- Family: Lamiaceae
- Genus: Gmelina
- Species: G. asiatica

Binomial name
- Gmelina asiatica Linné

Synonyms
- Bignonia discolor A.Rich. [Illegitimate] Gmelina asiatica f. inermis (Blanco) Moldenke; Gmelina asiatica f. lobata Moldenke; Gmelina asiatica f. parvifolia (Roxb.) Moldenke; Gmelina inermis Blanco; Gmelina lobata Gaertn. Gmelina parvifolia Roxb. Premna parvifolia Roth

= Gmelina asiatica =

Species of flowering plant

Gmelina asiatica is a plant species, described by Linnaeus, in the family Lamiaceae (but previously placed on the Verbenaceae). No subspecies are listed in the Catalogue of Life.

== Gallery ==
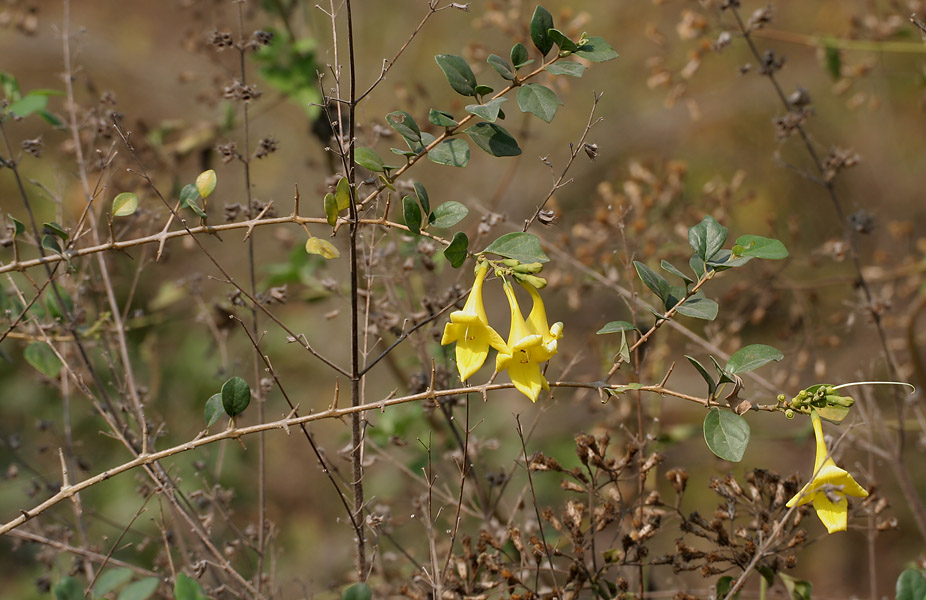

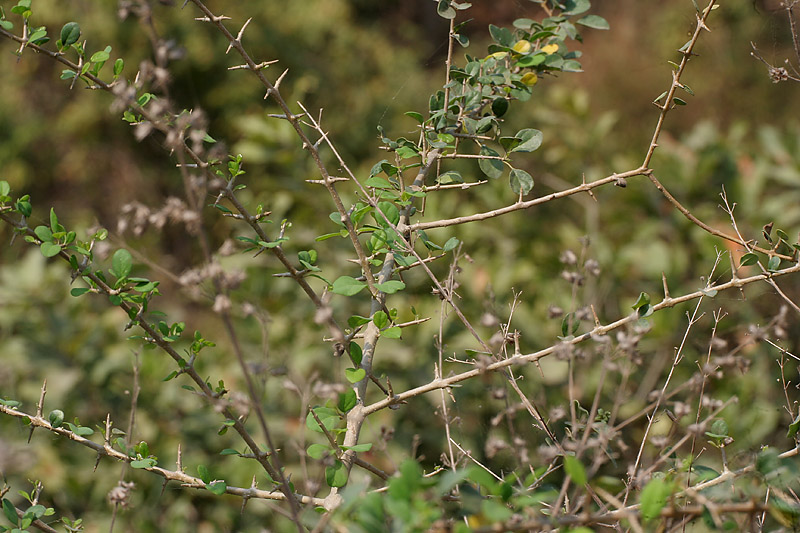

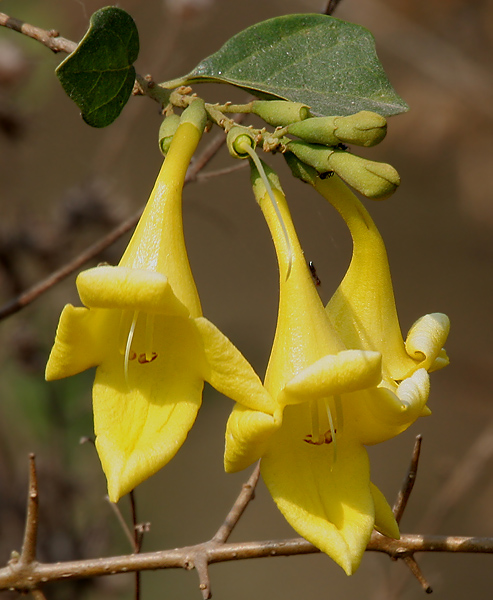

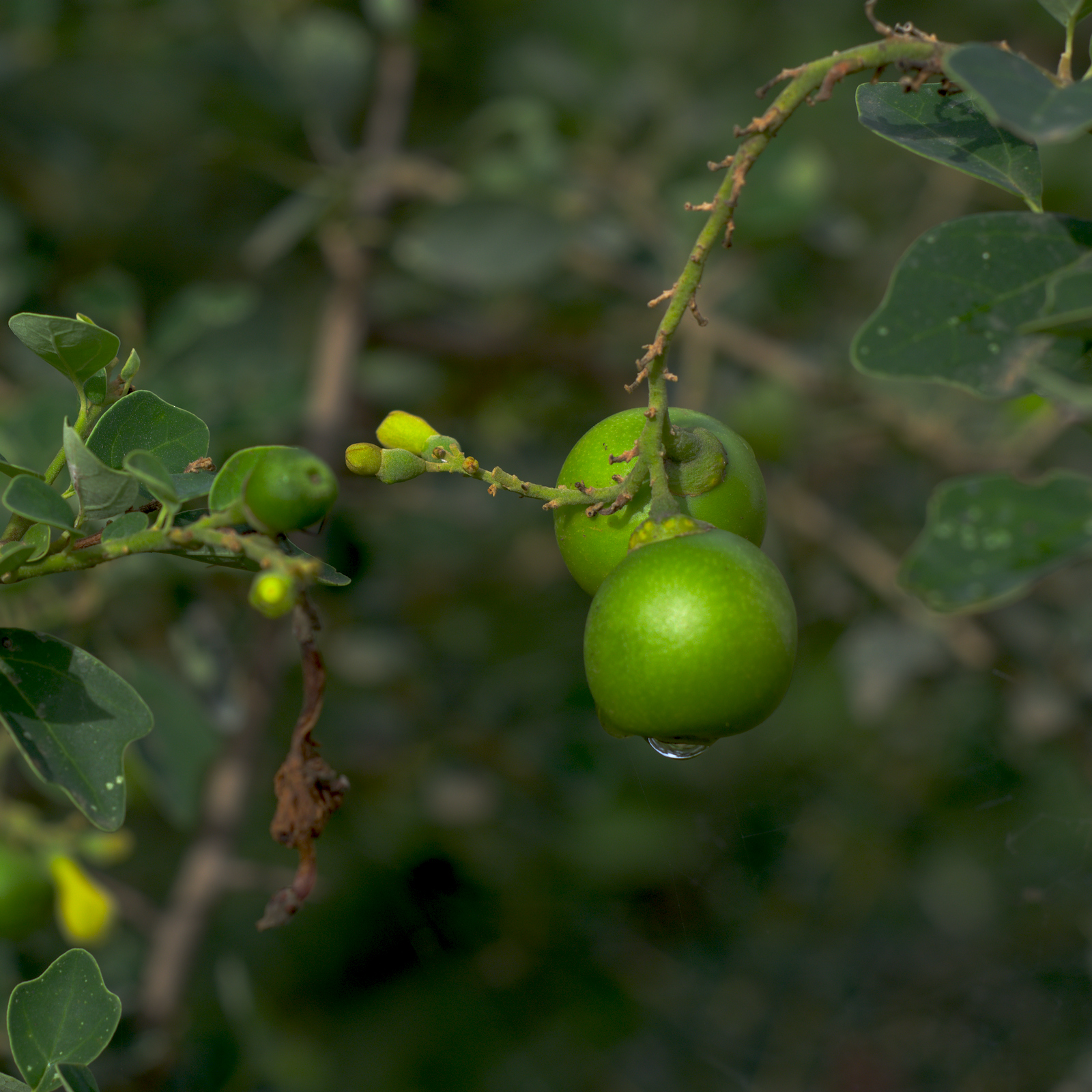
