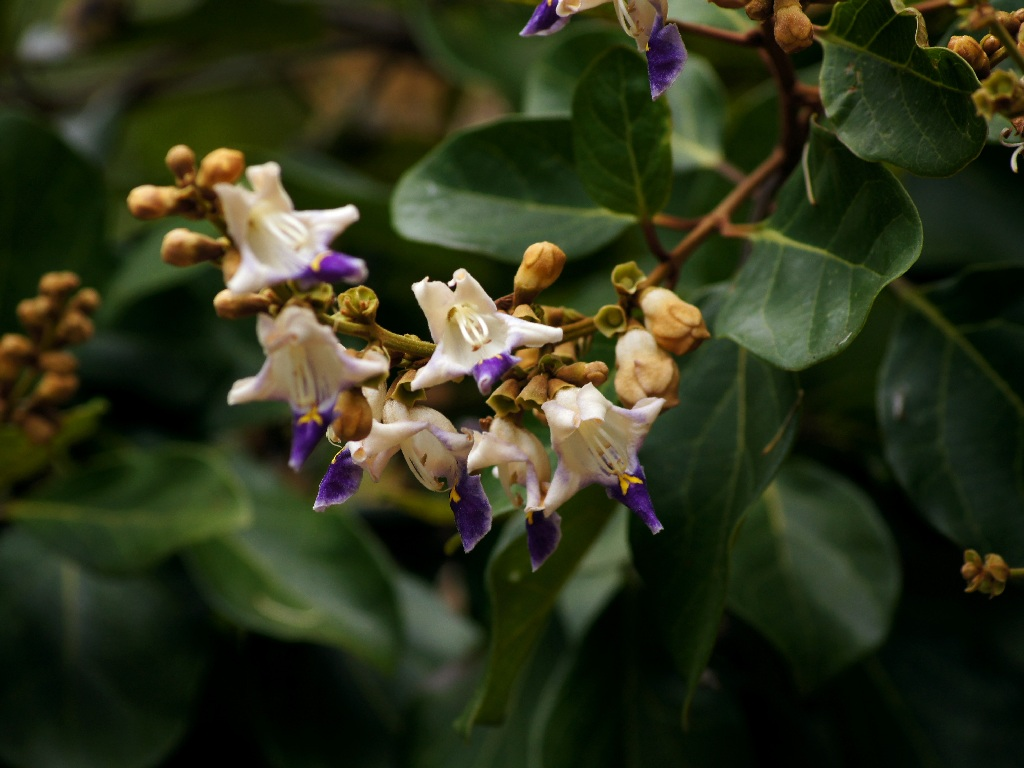
- Flowers and buds

Conservation status
- Least Concern (NCA)

Scientific classification
- Kingdom: Plantae
- Clade: Tracheophytes
- Clade: Angiosperms
- Clade: Eudicots
- Clade: Asterids
- Order: Lamiales
- Family: Lamiaceae
- Genus: Gmelina
- Species: G. fasciculiflora

Binomial name
- Gmelina fasciculiflora Benth.

= Gmelina fasciculiflora =

Species of tree

Gmelina fasciculiflora, known as the northern white beech, is a species of trees endemic to the Queensland tropical rain forests, Australia, of the mint (Lamiaceae) plant family. It is one of four recognised species of the genus Gmelina found in Australia.

== Taxonomy ==
Gmelina fasciculiflora was first described by English botanist George Bentham in his Flora Australiensis in 1870, from a collection by Dallachy. Its species name is derived from Latin and means "flowers in clusters".

== Description ==
It shares characteristics with the more southerly species Gmelina leichhardtii. Having pale twigs, similar shaped opposite leaves with a stem around 2 cm long. Leaves, however, are glossy and not nearly as hairy as the southern species. The leaves are 12 cm long and 7 wide. Flat glands may be seen at the base of the leaves as well as hairy domatia on the underside of the leaves. Purple spotted cream coloured flowers appear from February to May on large panicles. These attractive flowers are around 2 cm long. They later form purple coloured fleshy fruit in the form of a flattened drupe, 1 to 2 cm in diameter, ripening from September to January. As with the white beech, the fruit has a strong scent, and the aril quickly turns brown when exposed to the air. Stains on clothing from the flesh of this fruit are difficult to remove.

== Habitat and ecology ==
The natural habitat is both lowland and highland rainforests of northeastern Queensland. The fruit are eaten by the wompoo fruit dove.

== Cultivation and uses ==
Gmelina fasciculiflora has grown and flowered well in cultivation in Brisbane, where it has been planted in public parks. The timber is fairly soft for a hardwood and acidic. It is not resistant to termites. It is highly regarded for carving in Queensland.
