= Kinnerasani Wildlife Sanctuary =

Wildlife sanctuary in Telangana, India

- IUCN category IV (habitat/species management area)
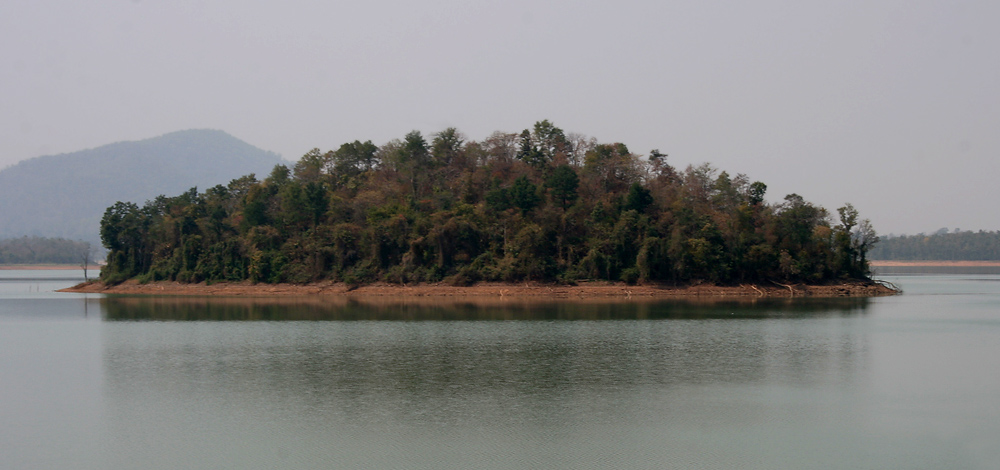
- View from a dam in Kinnarsani Wildlife Sanctuary

- Location within Telangana Location within India
- Interactive map of Kinnerasani Wildlife Sanctuary
- Location: Telangana, India
- Nearest city: Bhadrachalam
- Coordinates: 17°46′30″N 80°33′32″E
- Area: 635.40 km^{2} (157,010 acres)
- Governing body: Telangana Forest Department

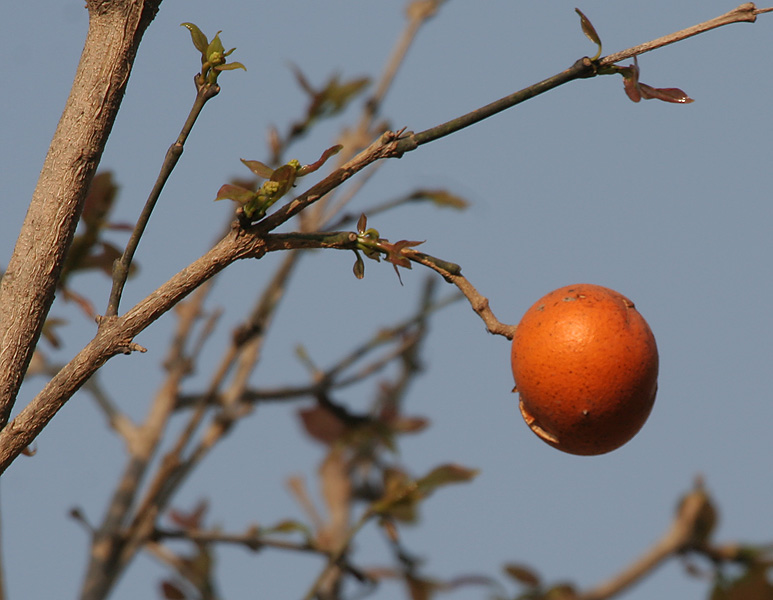
Strychnine tree in Kinnerasani Wildlife Sanctuary

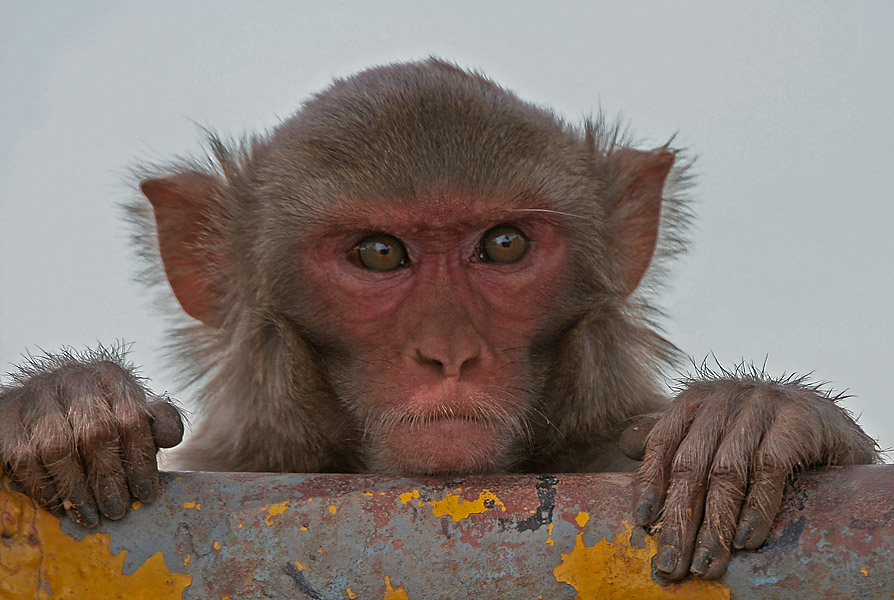
Rhesus Macaque (Macaca mulatta) in Kinnerasani Wildlife Sanctuary

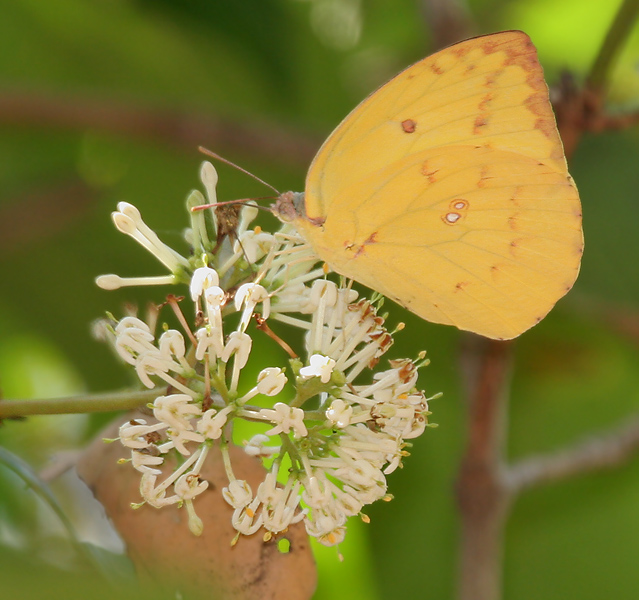
Common Emigrant (Catopsilia pomona) on Ixora brachiata

Kinnerasani Wildlife Sanctuary is a forest located in Bhadradri Kothagudem district, Telangana, India. The wildlife sanctuary is spread over an area of 635.40 km^{2} (157,010 acres) with the picturesque Kinnerasani Lake with densely forested islands in the middle of the sanctuary. It is 15 km (9.3 mi) from the district's headquarters is in Kothagudem and 25 km (16 mi) from temple town Bhadrachalam.

== Geography ==
This wildlife sanctuary has a forest mixed with dense scrub and meadows. It comes under the Eastern Highlands moist deciduous forests.

== Flora and fauna ==
Flora: There is diverse flora and fauna in this sanctuary. Floral diversity is high and includes

Common name	Formal name	Local name
Indian licorice	Abrus precatorius	గురువింద
Tree of Heaven	Ailanthus excelsa	పెదమాను
Neem tree	Azadirachta indica	వేప
Indian olibanum	Boswellia serrata	గుగ్గిలము
Banyan tree	Ficus benghalensis	మర్రి
Indian Fig tree	Ficus racemosa	మేడి
Garuga tree	Garuga pinnata	కొండవేప
Asiatic Bushbeech	Gmelina asiatica	పెదనేలి
Indian-elm tree	Holoptelea integrifolia	నాలి
Torch wood ixora	Ixora brachiata	కొరివి
Mahuva Butter tree	Madhuca longifolia	విప్ప
Strychnine tree	Strychnos nux-vomica	ముషిడి
Jamun tree	Syzygium cumini	నేరేడు

Fauna: There is a varied fauna present in the sanctuary
The Familiar Mammals in the sanctuary

Common name	Formal name	Observed
Indian muntjac	Muntiacus muntjak	Common
Four-horned antelope	Tetracerus quadricornis	Common
Indian gazelle	Gazella bennettii	Rare
Indian leopard	Panthera pardus fusca	Rare
Indian Bison	Bos gaurus	Rare
Indian jackal	Canis aureus indicus	Common
Indian boar	Sus scrofa cristatus	Common
Indian sloth bear	Melursus ursinus	Common
Indian crested porcupine	Hystrix indica	Common
Indian hare	Lepus nigricollis	Common
Jungle cat	Felis chaus	Common
Ruddy mongoose	Herpestes smithii	Common
Blackbuck	Antilope cervicapra	Common
Sambar deer	Rusa unicolor	Common
Spotted Deer	Axis axis	Common
Asian palm civet	Paradoxurus hermaphroditus	Common
Rhesus Macaque	Macaca mulatta	Common

== See also ==
- Wildlife of India
