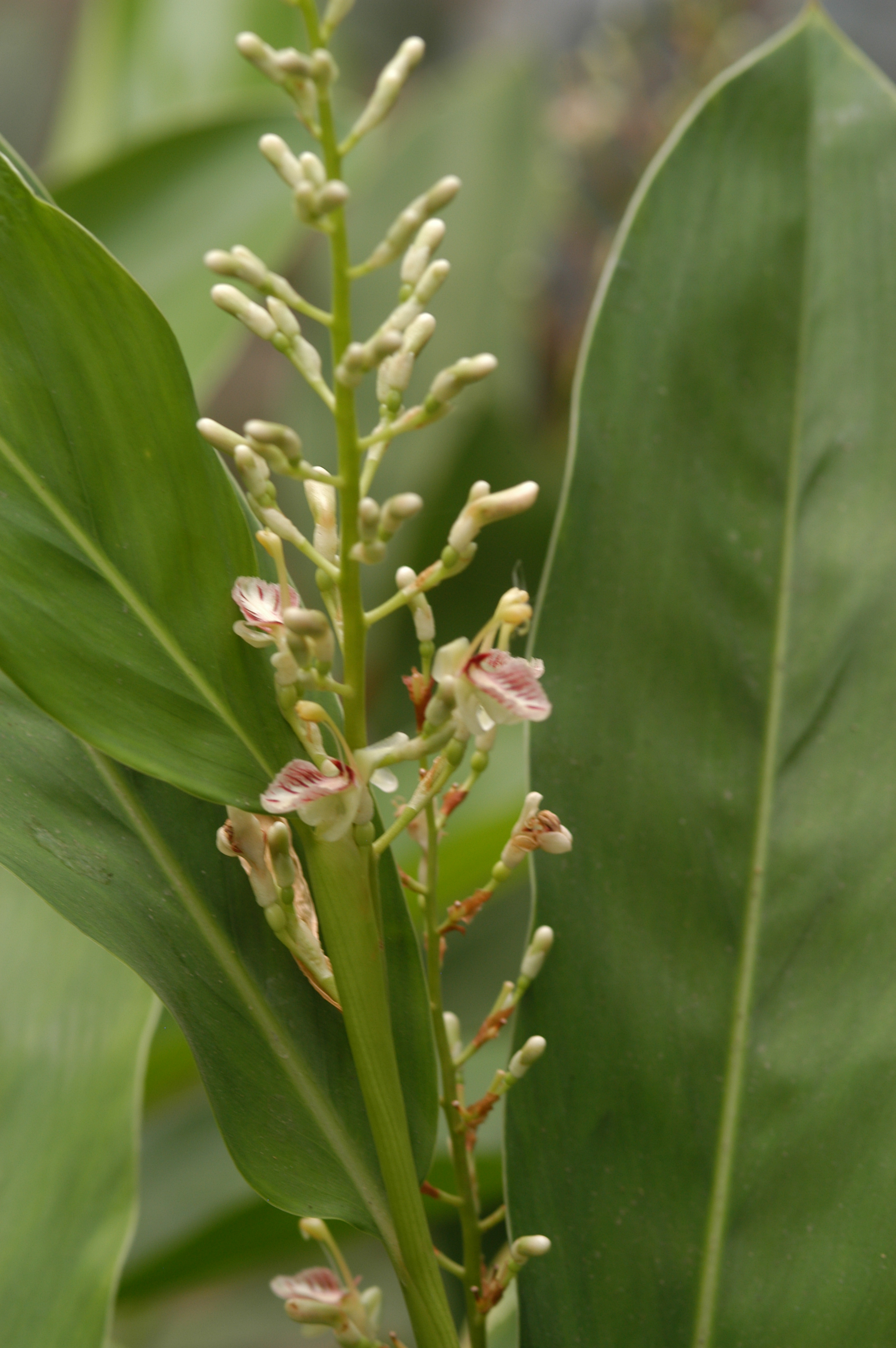

Scientific classification
- Kingdom: Plantae
- Clade: Tracheophytes
- Clade: Angiosperms
- Clade: Monocots
- Clade: Commelinids
- Order: Zingiberales
- Family: Zingiberaceae
- Genus: Alpinia
- Species: A. oxyphylla

Binomial name
- Alpinia oxyphylla Miq.

Synonyms
- Amomum amarum F.P.Sm.; Languas oxyphylla (Miq.) Merr.

= Alpinia oxyphylla =

Species of flowering plant

Alpinia oxyphylla, the sharp-leaf galangal, is a species of ginger native to East Asia. It was first described by Friedrich Anton Wilhelm Miquel.
