= Alpinia nieuwenhuizii =

Scientific classification
- Kingdom: Plantae
- Clade: Tracheophytes
- Clade: Angiosperms
- Clade: Monocots
- Clade: Commelinids
- Order: Zingiberales
- Family: Zingiberaceae
- Genus: Alpinia
- Species: A. nieuwenhuizii

Binomial name
- Alpinia nieuwenhuizii Valeton

Species of flowering plant

Alpinia nieuwenhuizii, also known as lalemas (in Iban) or terebak (in Sabah), is a species of flowering plant, a perennial tropical forest herb in the ginger family, that is endemic to Borneo.

== Description ==
The species grows as a clump of leafy shoots to 2–3.5 m in height from branching rhizomes in the topsoil. The leaves grow from a pseudostem with a swollen base composed of the leaf sheaths. The inflorescence is a lax terminal panicle of white, red and cream flowers. The round, edible fruits are green or red when young, ripening yellow, containing small seeds in a whitish aril.

== Distribution and habitat ==
The species is found in the lowland and mixed dipterocarp forest, as well as secondary forest, at elevations of up to 1,000 m, often along streams.

== Usage ==
The species is rarely cultivated, with the fruits eaten mainly by hunter-gatherers. The shoots may be eaten as a vegetable.
