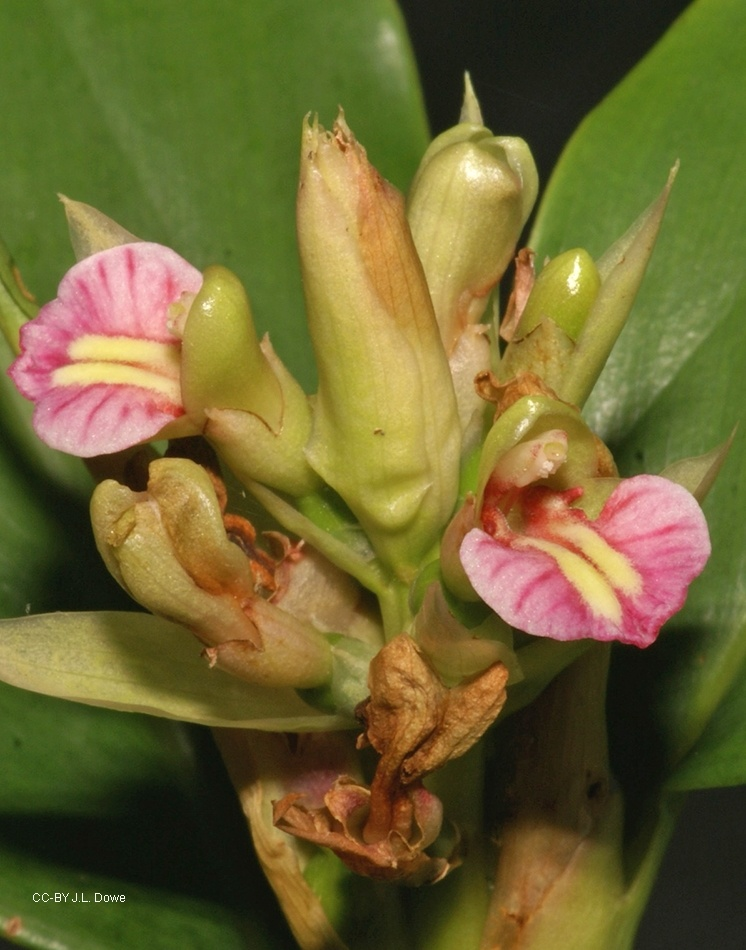

Conservation status
- Near Threatened (NCA)

Scientific classification
- Kingdom: Plantae
- Clade: Tracheophytes
- Clade: Angiosperms
- Clade: Monocots
- Clade: Commelinids
- Order: Zingiberales
- Family: Zingiberaceae
- Genus: Alpinia
- Species: A. hylandii

Binomial name
- Alpinia hylandii R.M.Sm.

= Alpinia hylandii =

Slender ginger

Species of flowering plant

Alpinia hylandii is a plant in the ginger family Zingiberaceae endemic to Queensland, Australia. It is a herbaceous shrub which grows to about 1 m high, and like many other gingers the true stems are underground and only the branches appear above ground. It has glossy leaves up to 16 cm long by 2.5 cm wide. Colourful pink and yellow flowers are produced in clusters at the ends of the branches, and are followed by globose, blue, capsular fruit containing numerous seeds.

== Taxonomy ==
The slender ginger was first described by the Scottish botanist and ginger specialist Rosemary Margaret Smith, who published it in the journal Notes from the Royal Botanic Garden, Edinburgh in 1980.

== Conservation ==
This species has been assessed as near threatened under the Queensland Government's Nature Conservation Act.

== Gallery ==
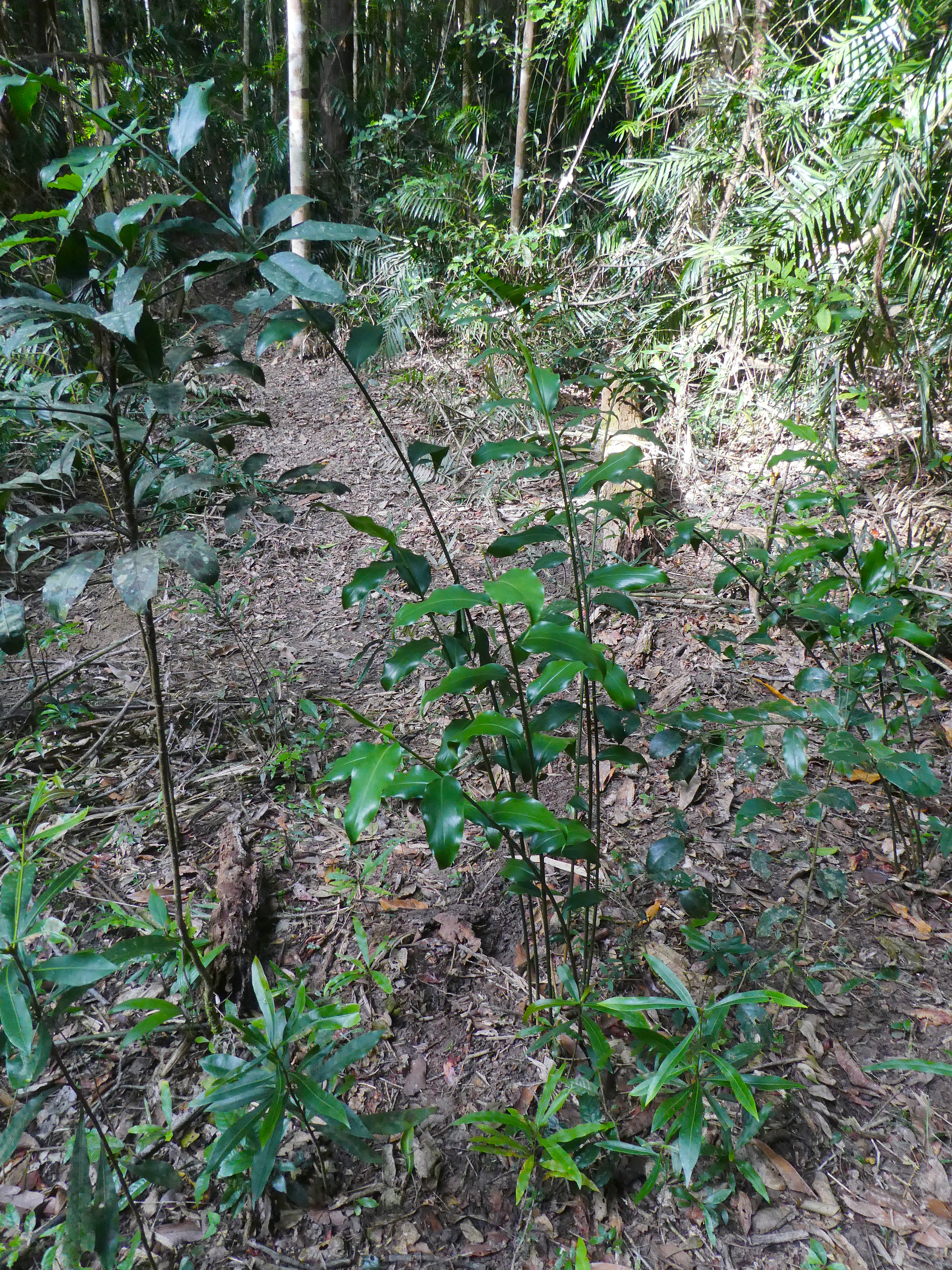
Branch and foliage

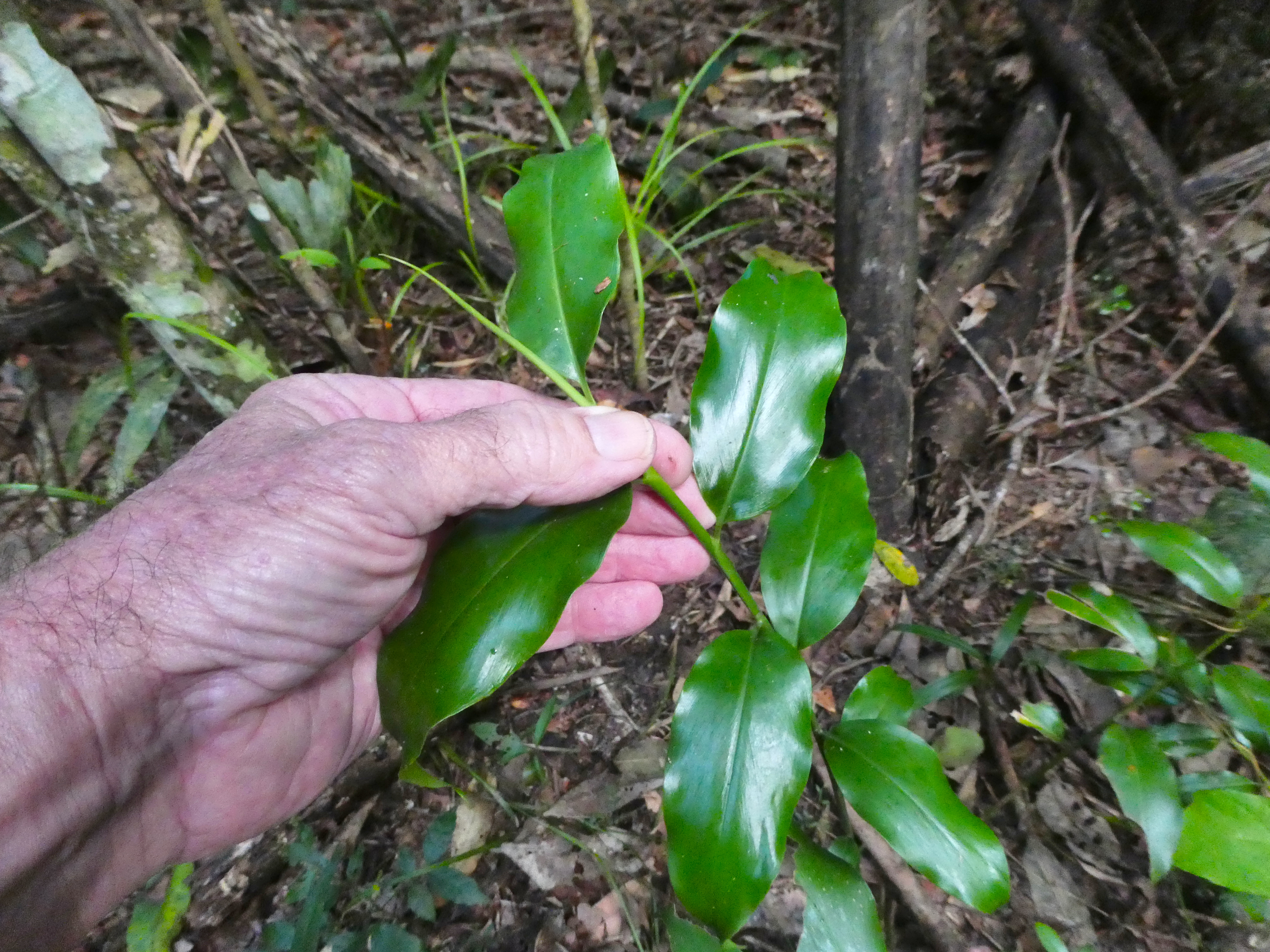
Leaves

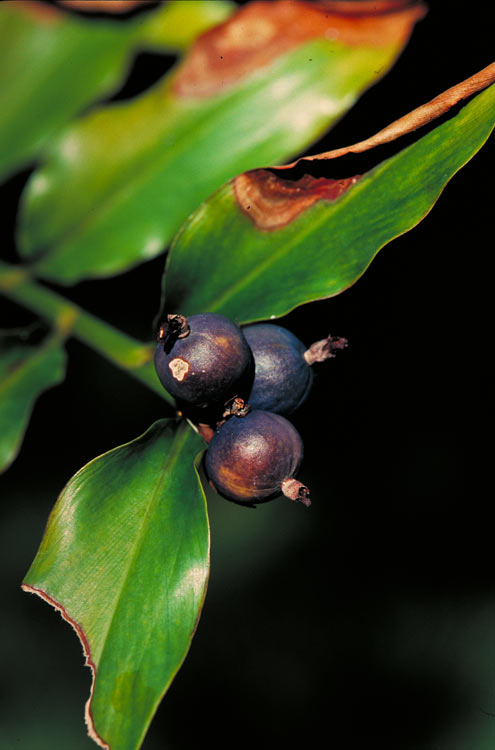
Fruit
