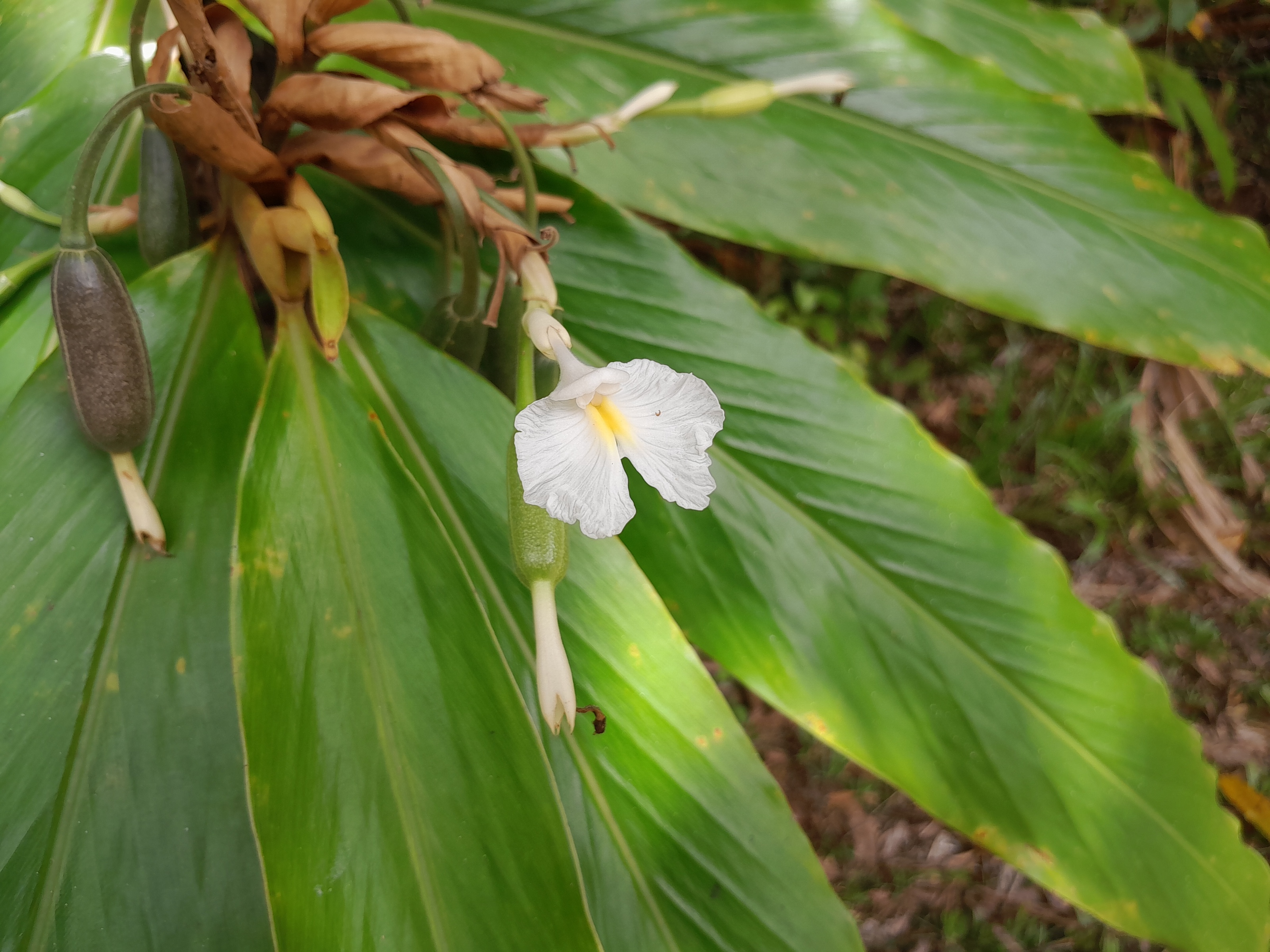
- In rainforest near Copperlode Falls Dam

Conservation status
- Least Concern (NCA)

Scientific classification
- Kingdom: Plantae
- Clade: Tracheophytes
- Clade: Angiosperms
- Clade: Monocots
- Clade: Commelinids
- Order: Zingiberales
- Family: Zingiberaceae
- Genus: Alpinia
- Species: A. arctiflora

Binomial name
- Alpinia arctiflora (F.Muell.) Benth.

Synonyms
- Hellenia arctiflora F.Muell.

= Alpinia arctiflora =

Snow ginger

Species of flowering plant

Alpinia arctiflora, commonly known as the pleated ginger, is a plant in the ginger family Zingiberaceae which is endemic to northeastern Queensland.

== Description ==
Alpinia arctiflora is a rhizomatous herb, meaning that the stem takes the form of an underground rhizome with only the leafy shoots and flowers appearing above ground. It grows to around 3 m (9.8 ft) high, each shoot carrying a number of lanceolate leaves on short petioles, each about 50 cm (20 in) long by 10 cm (3.9 in) wide. The inflorescence is an erect terminal panicle about 20 cm (7.9 in) long.

The white flowers have a pale green to cream calyx about 20 mm (0.79 in) long, a white corolla tube about 40 mm (1.6 in) long, and a distinctive broad labellum, tinted with yellow in the centre, about 20 mm (0.79 in) long and wide.

The fruit is a somewhat cylindrical dehiscent capsule to 80 mm × 20 mm (3.15 in × 0.79 in) long. The calyx persists at the tip of the capsule, and it holds numerous black or brown seeds about 3 mm (0.12 in) diameter. It is green at first, turning grey/brown at maturity.

=== Phenology ===
Flowering occurs from August to April and the fruits ripen from February to August.

== Taxonomy ==
The snow ginger was first described in 1873 by the Victorian Government botanist Ferdinand von Mueller, published in his massive work Fragmenta phytographiae Australiae as Hellenia arctiflora. In the same year George Bentham renamed the species Alpinia arctiflora, publishing it in his own work Flora Australiensis.

=== Etymology ===
The genus name Alpinia was given in honour of the Italian botanist Prospero Alpini. The species epithet arctiflora is built from the Latin words arcticus, "arctic", and flora, "flower", and refers to the white flowers.

== Distribution and habitat ==
This species is endemic to northeastern Queensland, from near Cooktown to Paluma. It grows in rainforest at altitudes ranging from near sea level to 1,300 m (4,300 ft).

== Conservation ==
This species is listed by the Queensland Department of Environment and Science as least concern. As of 27 January 2023, it has not been assessed by the IUCN.

== Gallery ==
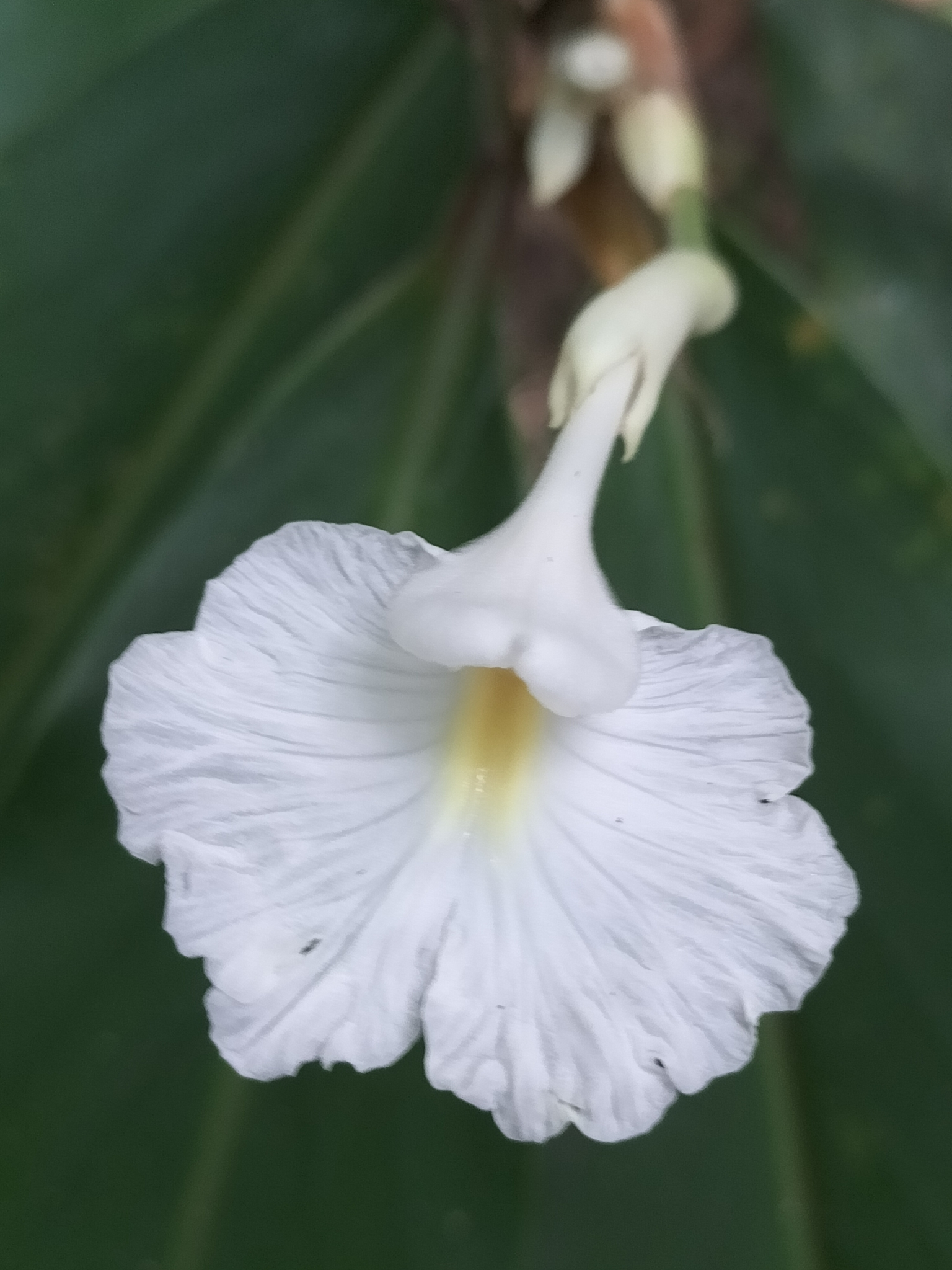

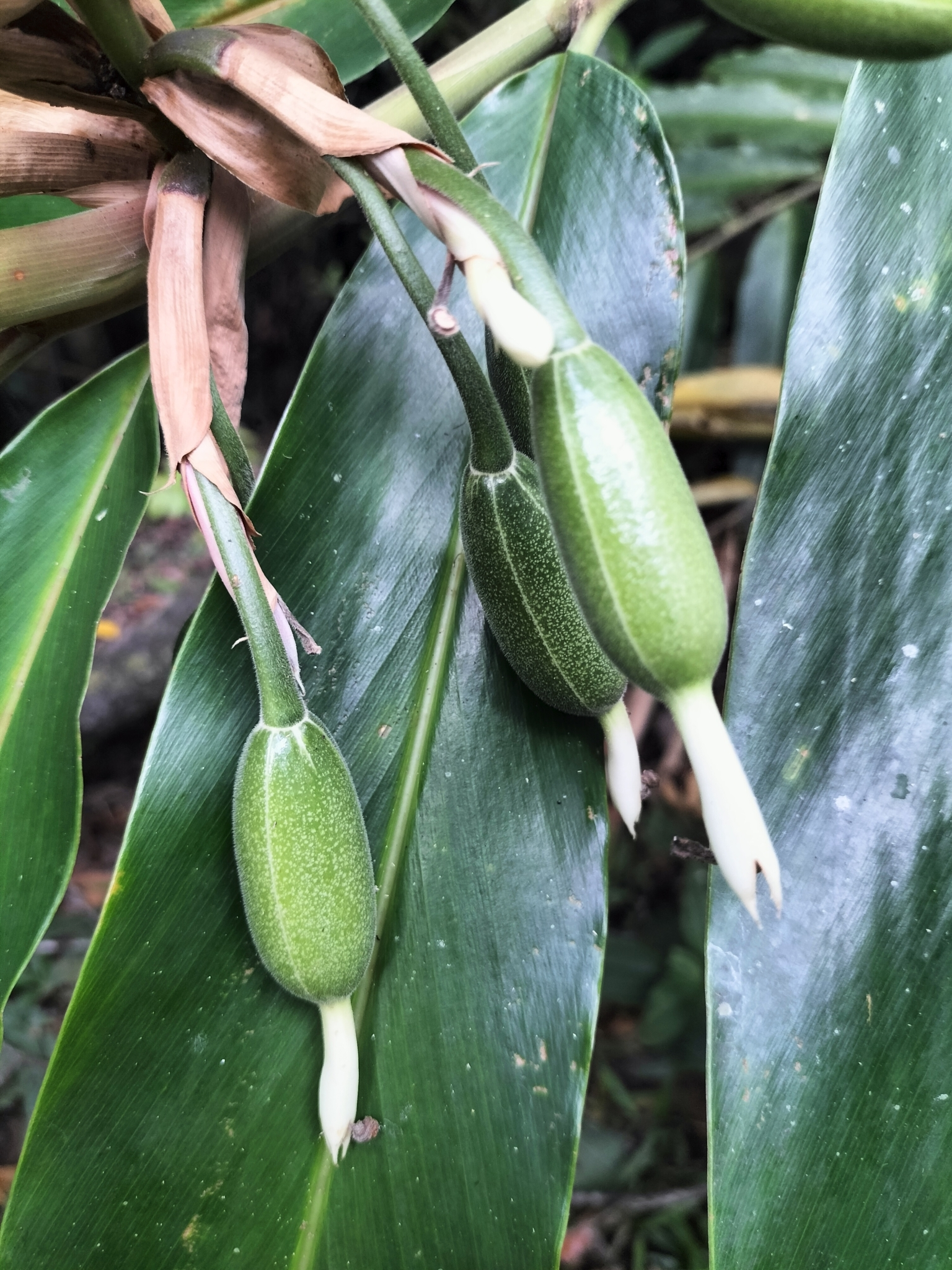

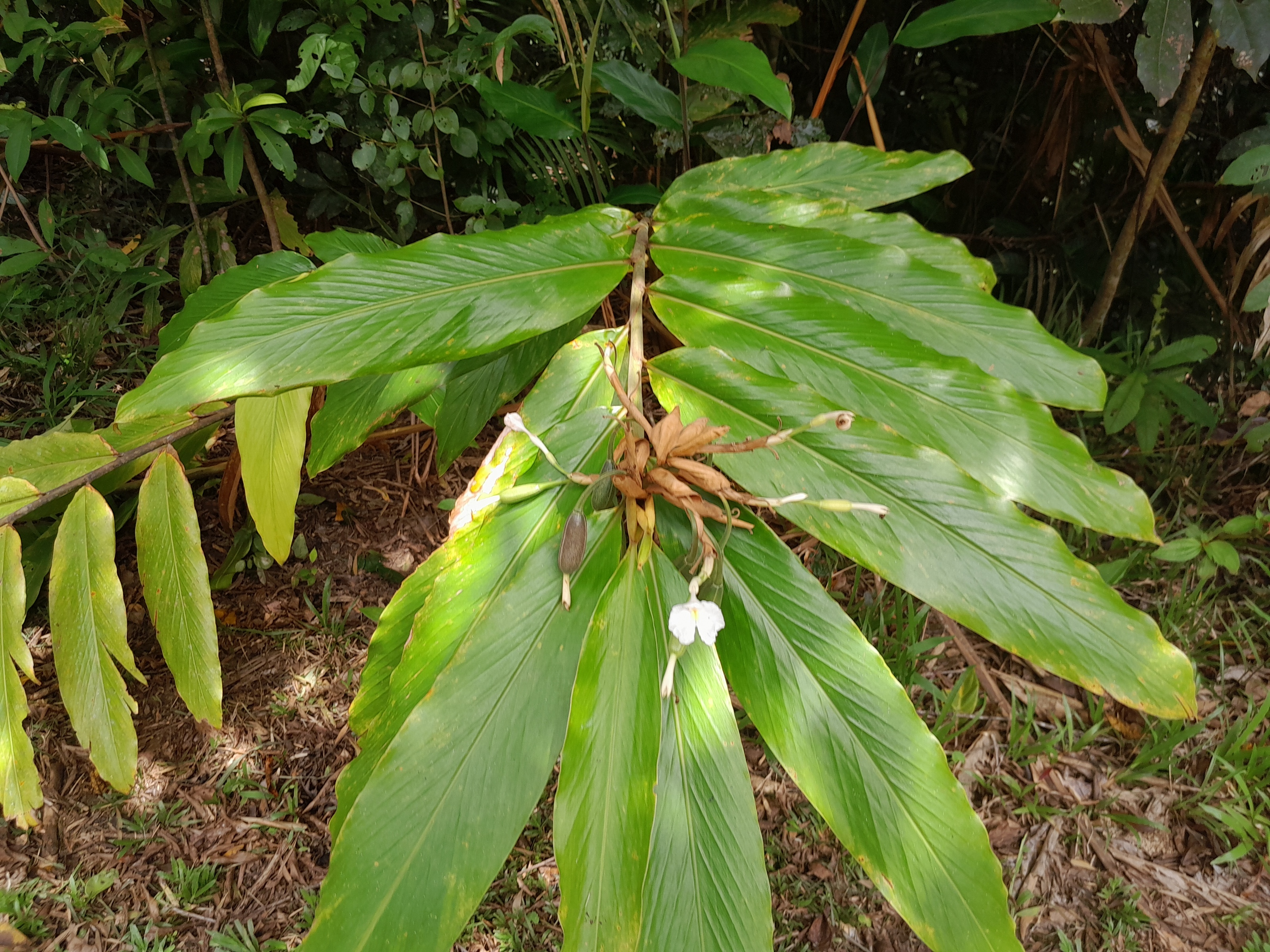

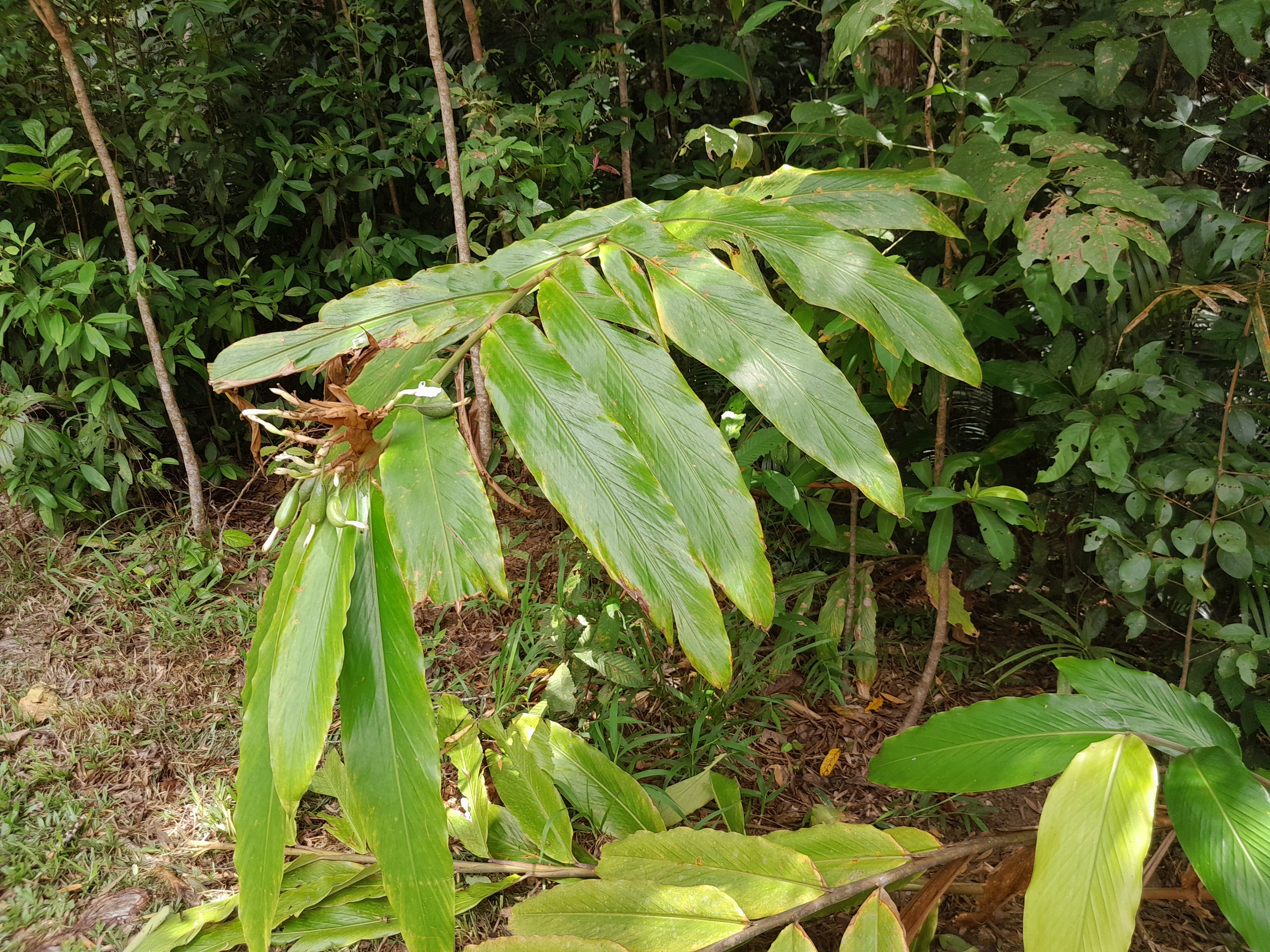
