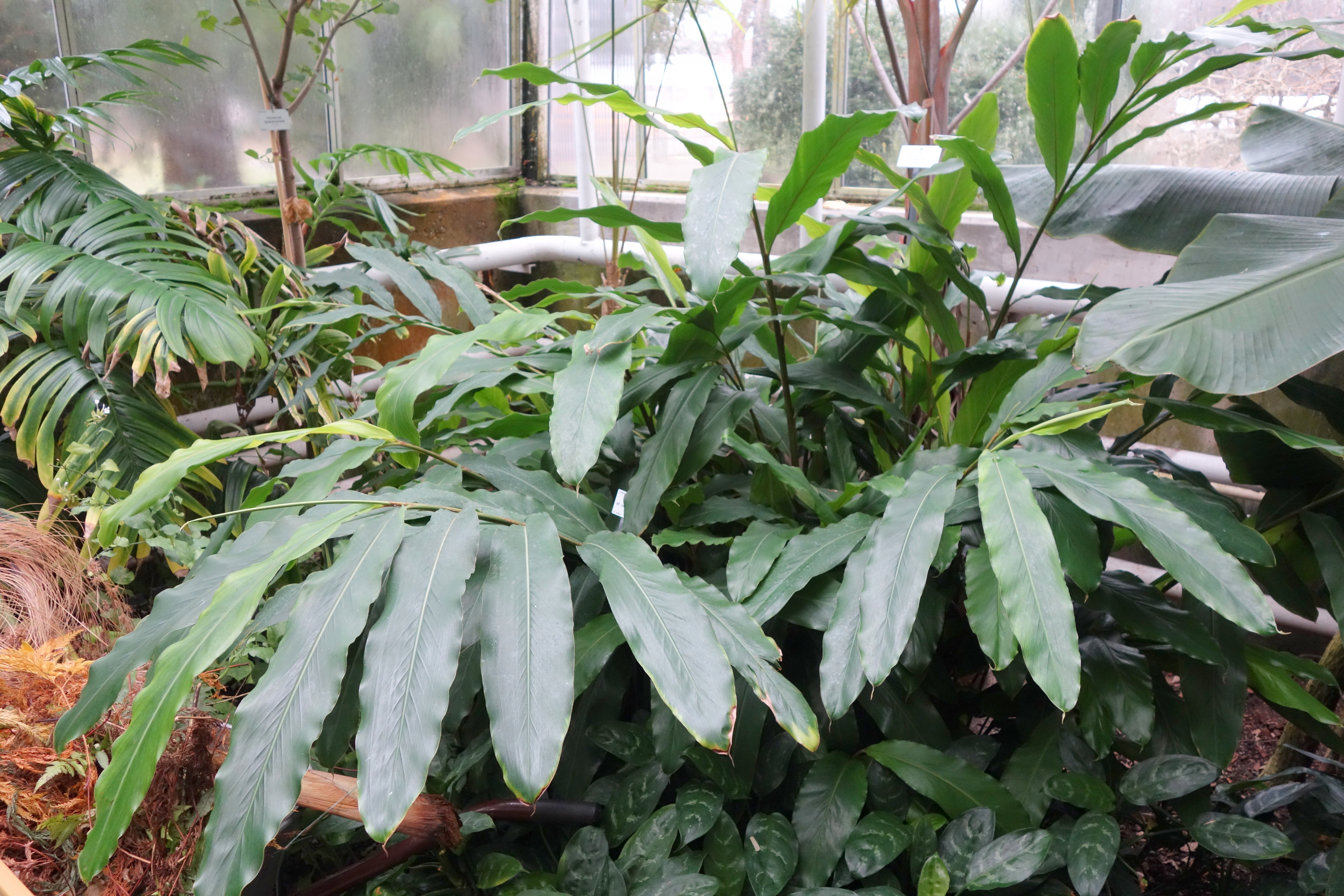

Scientific classification
- Kingdom: Plantae
- Clade: Tracheophytes
- Clade: Angiosperms
- Clade: Monocots
- Clade: Commelinids
- Order: Zingiberales
- Family: Zingiberaceae
- Genus: Alpinia
- Species: A. tonrokuensis

Binomial name
- Alpinia tonrokuensis Hayata

= Alpinia tonrokuensis =

Species of flowering plant

Alpinia tonrokuensis (屯鹿月桃) is a species of plant endemic to northern Taiwan. They are 2.5–4.5 meters in height, with oblong to lanceolate leaves, 55–82 × 12–17 cm.
