= Alpinia javanica =

Scientific classification
- Kingdom: Plantae
- Clade: Tracheophytes
- Clade: Angiosperms
- Clade: Monocots
- Clade: Commelinids
- Order: Zingiberales
- Family: Zingiberaceae
- Genus: Alpinia
- Species: A. javanica

Binomial name
- Alpinia javanica Blume

Species of flowering plant

Alpinia javanica, the Javanese alpinia, is a species of ginger occurring from Thailand to Malesia. It was first described by Carl Ludwig von Blume.
