= Alpinia beamanii =

Scientific classification
- Kingdom: Plantae
- Clade: Tracheophytes
- Clade: Angiosperms
- Clade: Monocots
- Clade: Commelinids
- Order: Zingiberales
- Family: Zingiberaceae
- Genus: Alpinia
- Species: A. beamanii

Binomial name
- Alpinia beamanii R.M.Sm.

Species of flowering plant

Alpinia beamanii is a monocotyledonous plant species described by Rosemary Margaret Smith. Alpinia beamanii is part of the genus Alpinia and the family Zingiberaceae.
