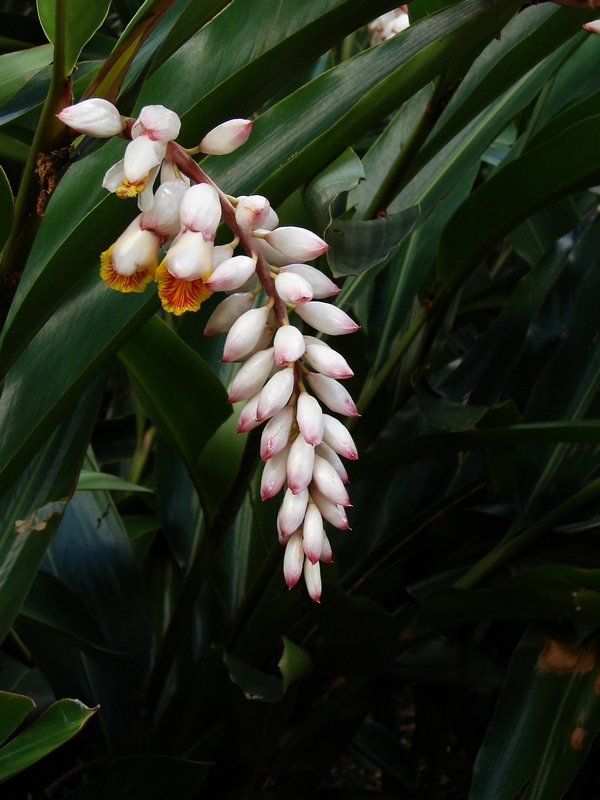
- Alpinia zerumbet

Scientific classification
- Kingdom: Plantae
- Clade: Tracheophytes
- Clade: Angiosperms
- Clade: Monocots
- Clade: Commelinids
- Order: Zingiberales
- Family: Zingiberaceae
- Subfamily: Alpinioideae
- Tribe: Alpinieae
- Genus: Alpinia; Roxb.

Species
- See text

Synonyms
- 20 synonyms: Albina Giseke; Allagas Raf.; Buekia Giseke; Catimbium Juss.; Cenolophon Blume; Doxanthes Raf.; Eriolopha Ridl.; Galanga Noronha nom. nud.; Guillainia Vieill.; Hellenia Willd. nom. illeg.; Heritiera Retz. nom. illeg.; Kolowratia C.Presl; Languas J.Koenig; Martensia Giseke; Monocystis Lindl.; Odontychium K.Schum.; Strobidia Miq.; Tonemone C.K.Lim nom. superfl.; Zerumbet J.C.Wendl. nom. illeg.

= Alpinia =

Genus of flowering plants

Alpinia is a genus of flowering plants in the ginger family, Zingiberaceae. Species are native to Asia, Australia, and the Pacific Islands, where they occur in tropical and subtropical climates. Several species are cultivated as ornamental plants.

== Taxonomy ==
The genus was erected by the Scottish botanist William Roxburgh in 1810, and published in the journal Asiatic Researches. It is named after Prospero Alpini, a 17th-century Italian botanist who specialized in exotic plants. Species of the genus are known generally as shell gingers.

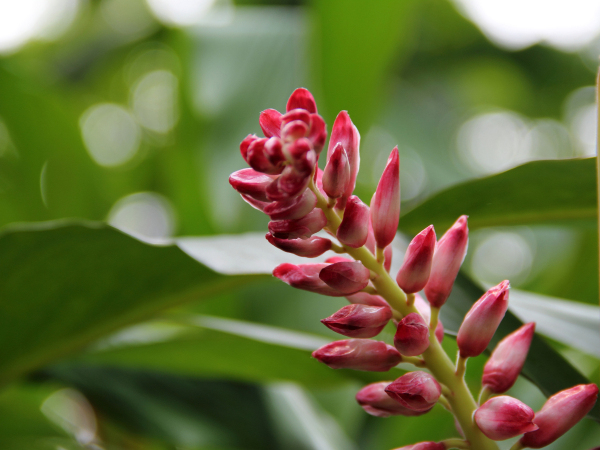
Alpinia hainanensis 'Shengzhen'

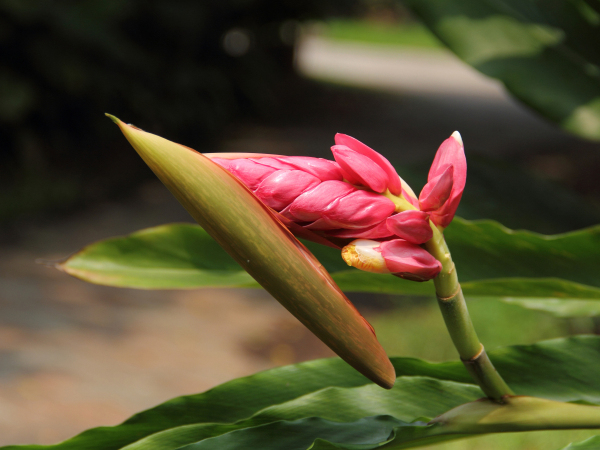
Alpinia hainanensis 'Shengzhen'

== Description ==
These herbs lack true stems, but have pseudostems usually up to about 3 metres (9.8 ft) long which are composed of the overlapping leaf sheaths. A few species have been known to reach 8 metres (26 ft). They grow from thick rhizomes. The leaves are lance-shaped to oblong. The inflorescence takes the form of a spike, a panicle, or a raceme. It may be hooded in bracts and bracteoles. The flower has a shallowly toothed calyx which is sometimes split on one side. The flower corolla is a cylindrical tube with three lobes at the mouth, the middle lobe larger and hoodlike in some taxa. There is one fertile stamen and two staminodes, which are often joined into a petal-like labellum, a structure that is inconspicuous in some species and quite showy in others. The fruit is a rounded, dry or fleshy capsule. The plants are generally aromatic due to their essential oils.

== Species ==
This is the largest genus in the ginger family, with 184 species and 2 hybrids accepted by Plants of the World Online as of 2 September 2026. A number of those are commonly grown for their flowers, including red ginger, and others are used as spices, including galangal.

=== Accepted species ===
- Alpinia abundiflora Burtt & R.M.Sm.
- Alpinia adana C.K.Lim
- Alpinia amentacea R.M.Sm.
- Alpinia apoensis Elmer
- Alpinia aquatica (Retz.) Roscoe
- Alpinia arctiflora (F.Muell.) Benth.
- Alpinia argentea (B.L.Burtt & R.M.Sm.) R.M.Sm.
- Alpinia arundelliana (F.M.Bailey) K.Schum.
- Alpinia asmy C.K.Lim
- Alpinia assimilis Ridl.}
- Alpinia austrosinense (D.Fang) P.Zou & Y.S.Ye
- Alpinia bambusifolia C.F.Liang & D.Fang
- Alpinia beamanii R.M.Sm.
- Alpinia bodenii R.M.Sm.
- Alpinia boninsimensis Makino
- Alpinia borraginoides K.Schum.
- Alpinia brachyantha Merr.
- Alpinia brevilabris C.Presl
- Alpinia breviligulata (Gagnep.) Gagnep.
- Alpinia brevis T.L.Wu & S.J.Chen
- Alpinia caerulea (R.Br.) Benth.
- Alpinia calcarata (Andrews) Roscoe
- Alpinia calcicola Q.B.Nguyen & M.F.Newman
- Alpinia capitellata Jack
- Alpinia chinensis (Retz.) Roscoe
- Alpinia chrysorachis K.Schum.
- Alpinia conchigera Griff.
- Alpinia condensata Valeton
- Alpinia congesta Elmer
- Alpinia conghuaensis J.P.Liao & T.L.Wu
- Alpinia conglomerata R.M.Sm.
- Alpinia copelandii Ridl.
- Alpinia coriacea T.L.Wu & S.J.Chen
- Alpinia coriandriodora D.Fang
- Alpinia corneri (Holttum) R.M.Sm.
- Alpinia cumingii K.Schum.
- Alpinia cylindrocephala K.Schum.
- Alpinia denticulata (Ridl.) Holttum
- Alpinia diffissa Roscoe
- Alpinia diversifolia (Elmer) Elmer
- Alpinia elegans (C.Presl) K.Schum.
- Alpinia elmeri R.M.Sm.
- Alpinia emaculata S.Q.Tong
- Alpinia epiphytica Meekiong, Ipor & Tawan
- Alpinia eubractea K.Schum.
- Alpinia fax B.L.Burtt & R.M.Sm.
- Alpinia flabellata Ridl.
- Alpinia formosana K.Schum.
- Alpinia foxworthyi Ridl.
- Alpinia fusiformis R.M.Sm.
- Alpinia gagnepainii K.Schum.
- Alpinia galanga (L.) Willd.
- Alpinia glabra Ridl.
- Alpinia glabrescens Ridl.
- Alpinia globosa (Lour.) Horan.
- Alpinia graminea Ridl.
- Alpinia guinanensis D.Fang & X.X.Chen
- Alpinia haenkei C.Presl
- Alpinia hainanensis K.Schum.
- Alpinia hansenii R.M.Sm.
- Alpinia havilandii K.Schum.
- Alpinia hirsuta (Lour.) Horan.
- Alpinia hoangviet D.D.Nguyen & V.C.Nguyen
- Alpinia hongiaoensis Tagane
- Alpinia hulstijnii Valeton
- Alpinia hylandii R.M.Sm.
- Alpinia illustris Ridl.
- Alpinia intermedia Gagnep.
- Alpinia japonica (Thunb.) Miq.
- Alpinia javanica Blume
- Alpinia jianganfeng T.L.Wu
- Alpinia jingxiensis D.Fang
- Alpinia kawakamii Hayata
- Alpinia koidzumiana Kitam.
- Alpinia koshunensis Hayata
- Alpinia kusshakuensis Hayata
- Alpinia kwangsiensis T.L.Wu & S.J.Chen
- Alpinia lalashanensis S.S.Ying
- Alpinia laosensis Gagnep.
- Alpinia latilabris Ridl.
- Alpinia lauterbachii Valeton
- Alpinia lidaoensis S.S.Ying
- Alpinia ligulata K.Schum.
- Alpinia ludwigiana R.M.Sm.
- Alpinia maclurei Merr.
- Alpinia macrocephala K.Schum.
- Alpinia macrocrista Ardiyani & Ardi
- Alpinia macroscaphis K.Schum.
- Alpinia macrostaminodia Chaveer. & Sudmoon
- Alpinia macrostephana (Baker) Ridl.
- Alpinia macroura K.Schum.
- Alpinia malaccensis (Burm.f.) Roscoe
- Alpinia manii Baker
- Alpinia martini R.M.Sm.
- Alpinia melichroa K.Schum.
- Alpinia menghaiensis S.Q.Tong & Y.M.Xia
- Alpinia mesanthera Hayata
- Alpinia microlophon Ridl.
- Alpinia modesta F.Muell. ex K.Schum.
- Alpinia mollis C.Presl
- Alpinia mollissima Ridl.
- Alpinia murdochii Ridl.
- Alpinia mutica Roxb.
- Alpinia myriocratera K.Schum.
- Alpinia nantoensis F.Y.Lu & Y.W.Kuo
- Alpinia napoensis H.Dong & G.J.Xu
- Alpinia nelumboides Nob.Tanaka, T.T.K.Van & V.Hoang
- Alpinia newmanii N.S.Lý
- Alpinia nieuwenhuizii Valeton
- Alpinia nigra (Gaertn.) Burtt
- Alpinia nobilis Ridl.
- Alpinia novae-pommeraniae K.Schum.
- Alpinia oblongifolia Hayata
- Alpinia officinarum Hance
- Alpinia orthostachys K.Schum.
- Alpinia oui Y.H.Tseng & Chih C.Wang
- Alpinia ovata Z.L.Zhao & L.S.Xu
- Alpinia ovoidocarpa H.Dong & G.J.Xu
- Alpinia oxymitra K.Schum.
- Alpinia oxyphylla Miq.
- Alpinia padacanca Valeton ex K.Heyne
- Alpinia pahangensis Ridl.
- Alpinia penduliflora Ridl.
- Alpinia petiolata Baker
- Alpinia pinnanensis T.L.Wu & S.J.Chen
- Alpinia platychilus K.Schum.
- Alpinia polyantha D.Fang
- Alpinia pricei Hayata
- Alpinia psilogyna D.Fang
- Alpinia ptychanthera K.Schum.
- Alpinia pubiflora (Benth.) K.Schum.
- Alpinia pulchella (K.Schum.) K.Schum.
- Alpinia pulcherrima Ridl.
- Alpinia pumila Hook.f.
- Alpinia purpurata (Vieill.) K.Schum.
- Alpinia pusilla Ardi & Ardiyani
- Alpinia rafflesiana Wall. ex Baker
- Alpinia rigida Ridl.
- Alpinia romblonensis Elmer
- Alpinia romburghiana Valeton
- Alpinia rosea Elmer
- Alpinia roxburghii Sweet
- Alpinia rubricaulis K.Schum.
- Alpinia rubromaculata S.Q.Tong
- Alpinia rufa (C.Presl) Náves
- Alpinia rufescens (Thwaites) K.Schum.
- Alpinia rugosa S.J.Chen & Z.Y.Chen
- Alpinia scabra (Blume) Náves
- Alpinia seimundii Ridl.
- Alpinia sessiliflora Kitam.
- Alpinia shimadae Hayata
- Alpinia shoukaensis S.S.Ying
- Alpinia siamensis K.Schum.
- Alpinia sibuyanensis Elmer
- Alpinia smithiae M.Sabu & Mangaly
- Alpinia stachyodes Hance
- Alpinia stenostachys K.Schum.
- Alpinia strobiliformis T.L.Wu & S.J.Chen
- Alpinia subfusicarpa Elmer
- Alpinia submutica K.Schum.
- Alpinia subspicata Valeton
- Alpinia suriana C.K.Lim
- Alpinia tamacuensis R.M.Sm.
- Alpinia tonkinensis Gagnep.
- Alpinia tonrokuensis Hayata
- Alpinia trachyascus K.Schum.
- Alpinia uraiensis Hayata
- Alpinia velveta R.M.Sm.
- Alpinia versicolor K.Schum.
- Alpinia vietnamica H.Ð.Trần, Luu & Škorničk.
- Alpinia vitellina (Lindl.) Ridl.
- Alpinia vittata W.Bull
- Alpinia warburgii K.Schum.
- Alpinia wenzelii Merr.
- Alpinia zerumbet (Pers.) B.L.Burtt & R.M.Sm.

=== Accepted hybrids ===
- Alpinia × ilanensis S.C.Liu & J.C.Wang
- Alpinia × okinawaensis Tawada

== Distribution ==
The genus Alpinia is native to the countries (and regions) of; Andaman Islands, Assam, Bangladesh, Bismarck Archipelago, Bonin Islands, Borneo, Cambodia, Caroline Islands, southern China, East Himalaya, Fiji, Hainan, India, Japan, Java, Laos, Lesser Sunda Islands, Malaya, Maluku Islands, Myanmar, Nepal, New Caledonia, New Guinea, New South Wales, Nicobar Islands, Philippines, Queensland, Ryukyu Islands, Samoa, Solomon Islands, Sri Lanka, Sulawesi, Sumatra, Taiwan, Thailand, Tibet, Vanuatu, Vietnam and Volcano Islands.

== Ecology ==
Most Alpinia are plants of forest understory habitat. Most are pollinated by large bees, but some are pollinated by birds and bats.

== Uses ==
According to a research team of National Chung Hsing University, Alpinia was found to have anti-inflammatory, hypolipidemic, anti-tumor and other effects.

== Gallery ==
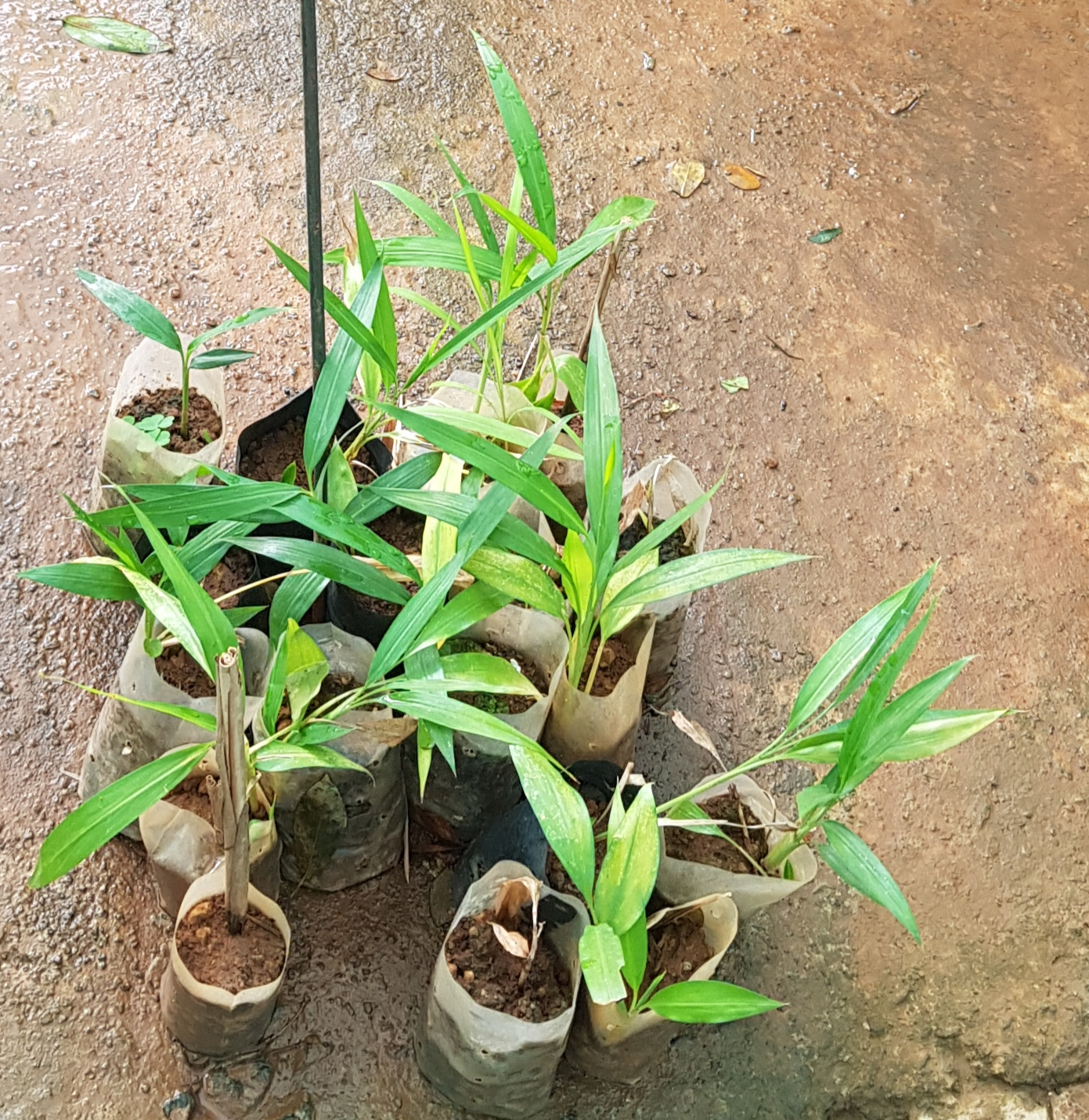
Alpinia Calcarata

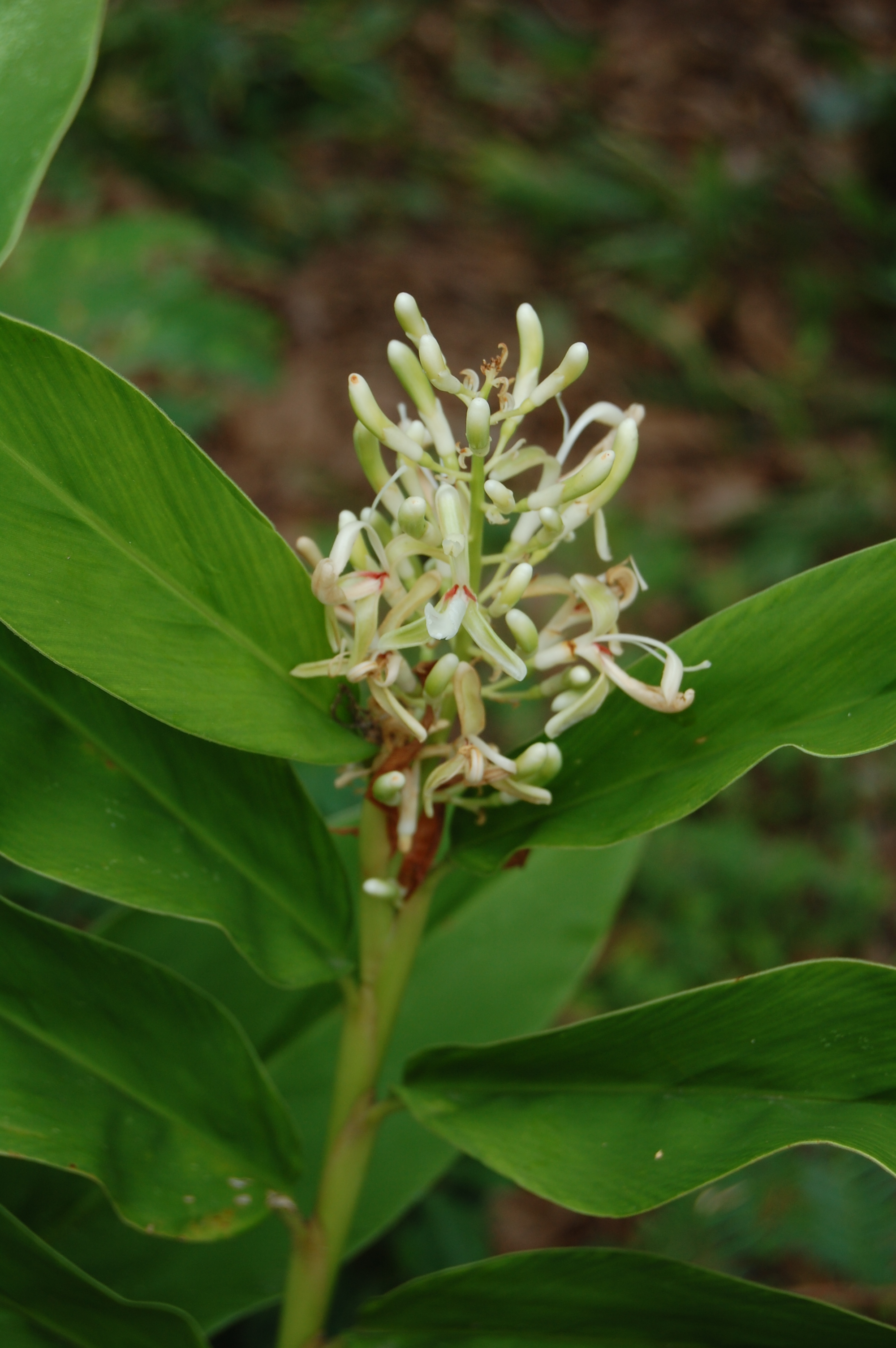
Alpinia galanga

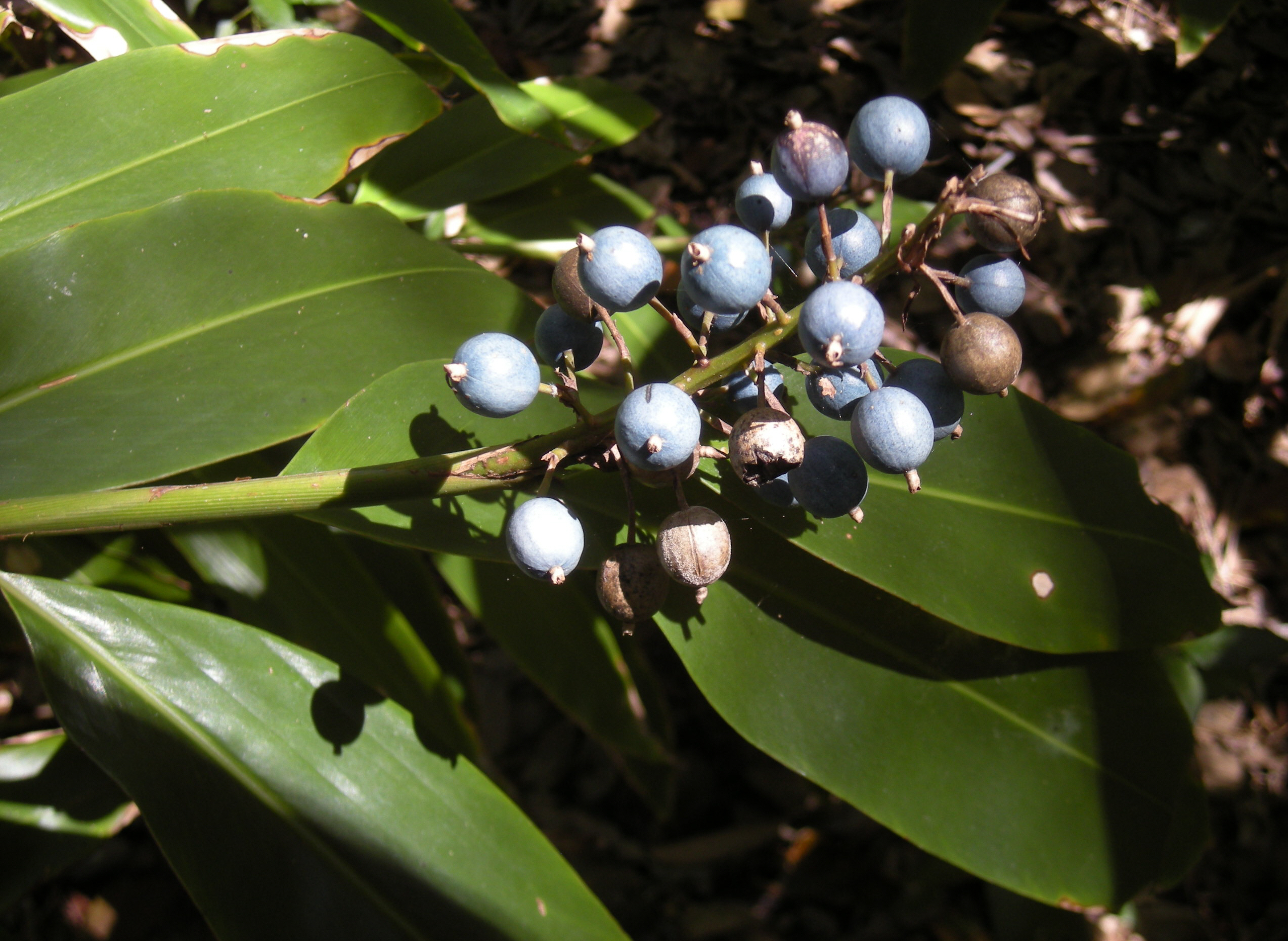
Alpinia caerulea

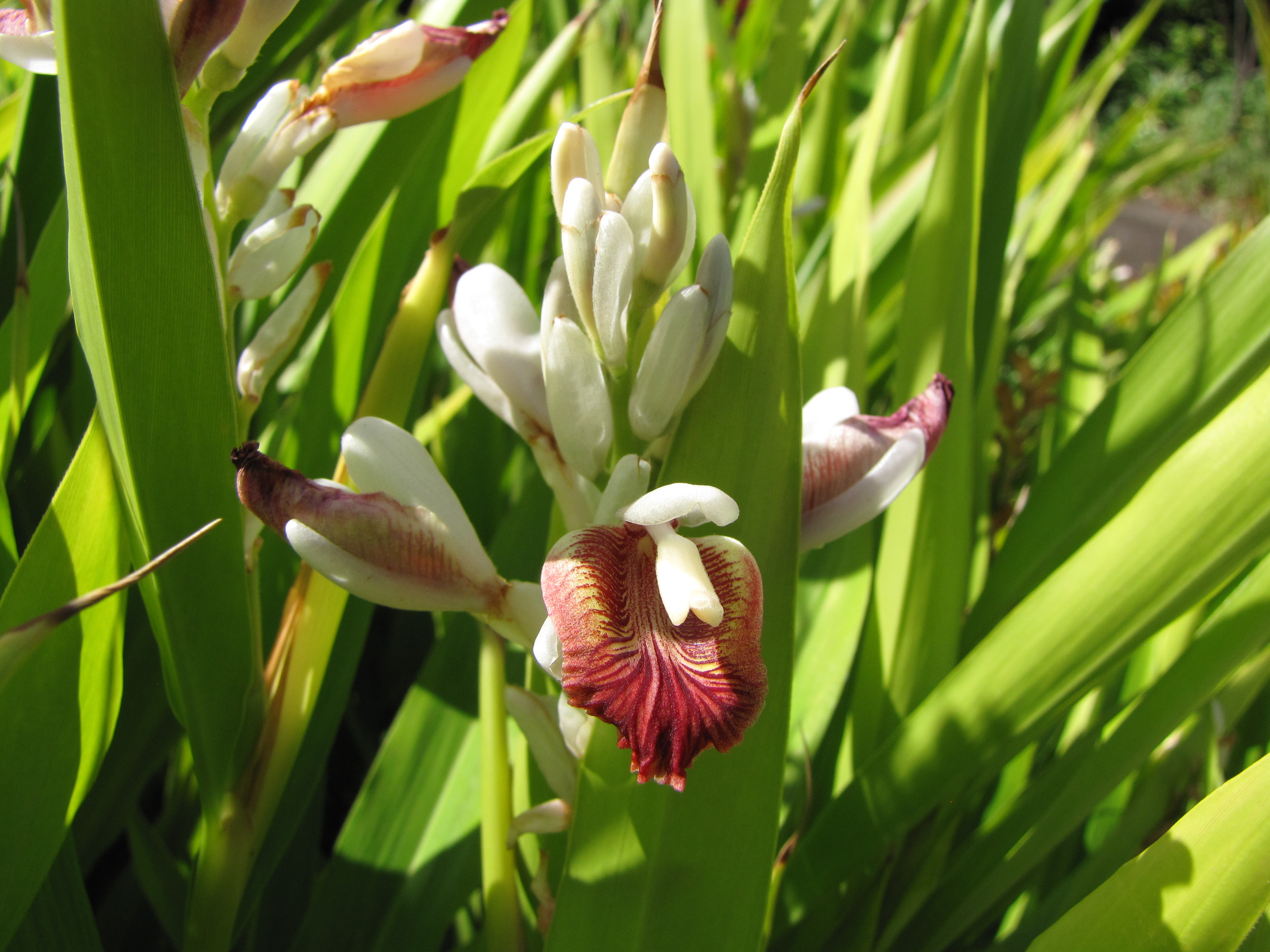
Alpinia calcarata

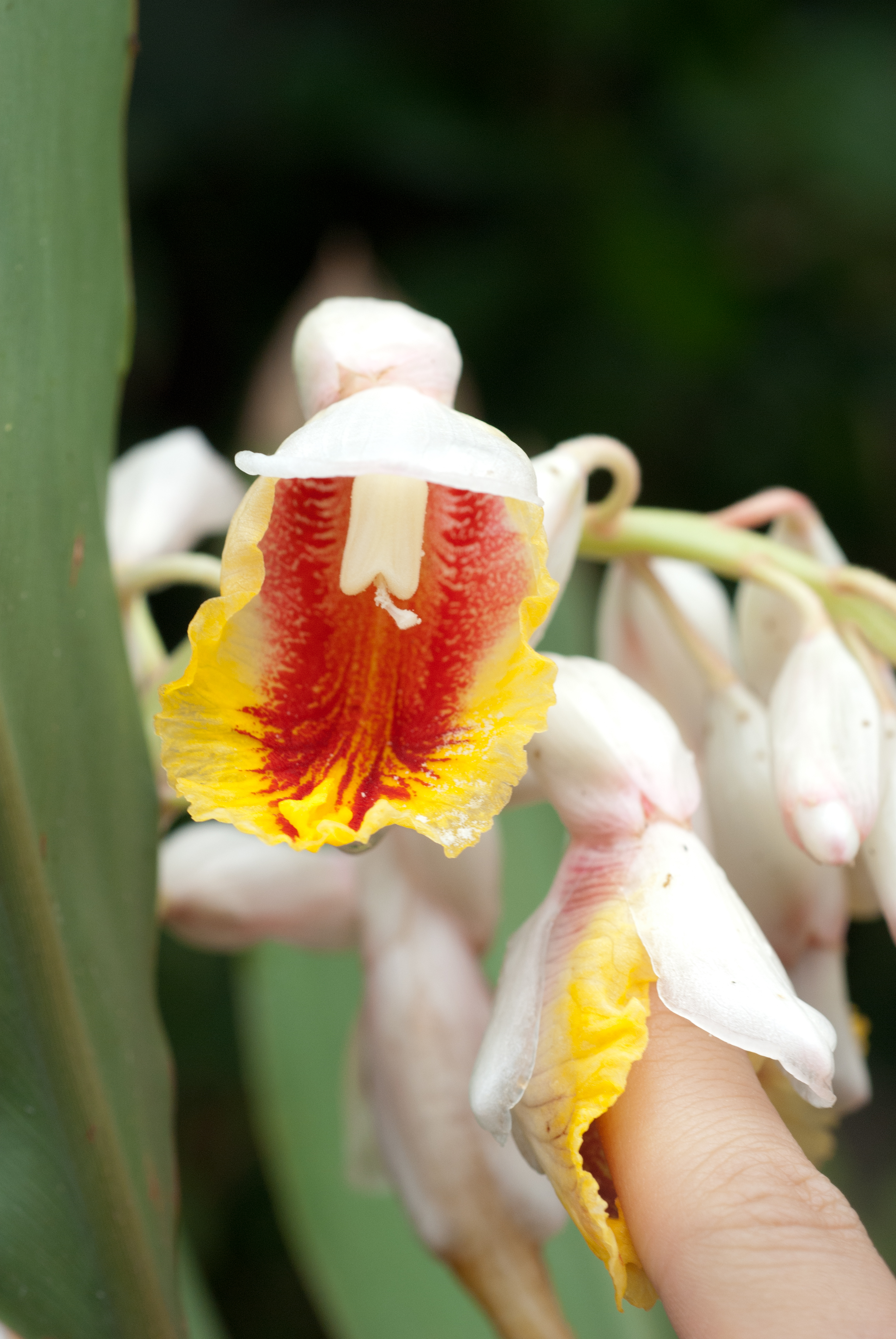
Alpinia zerumbet

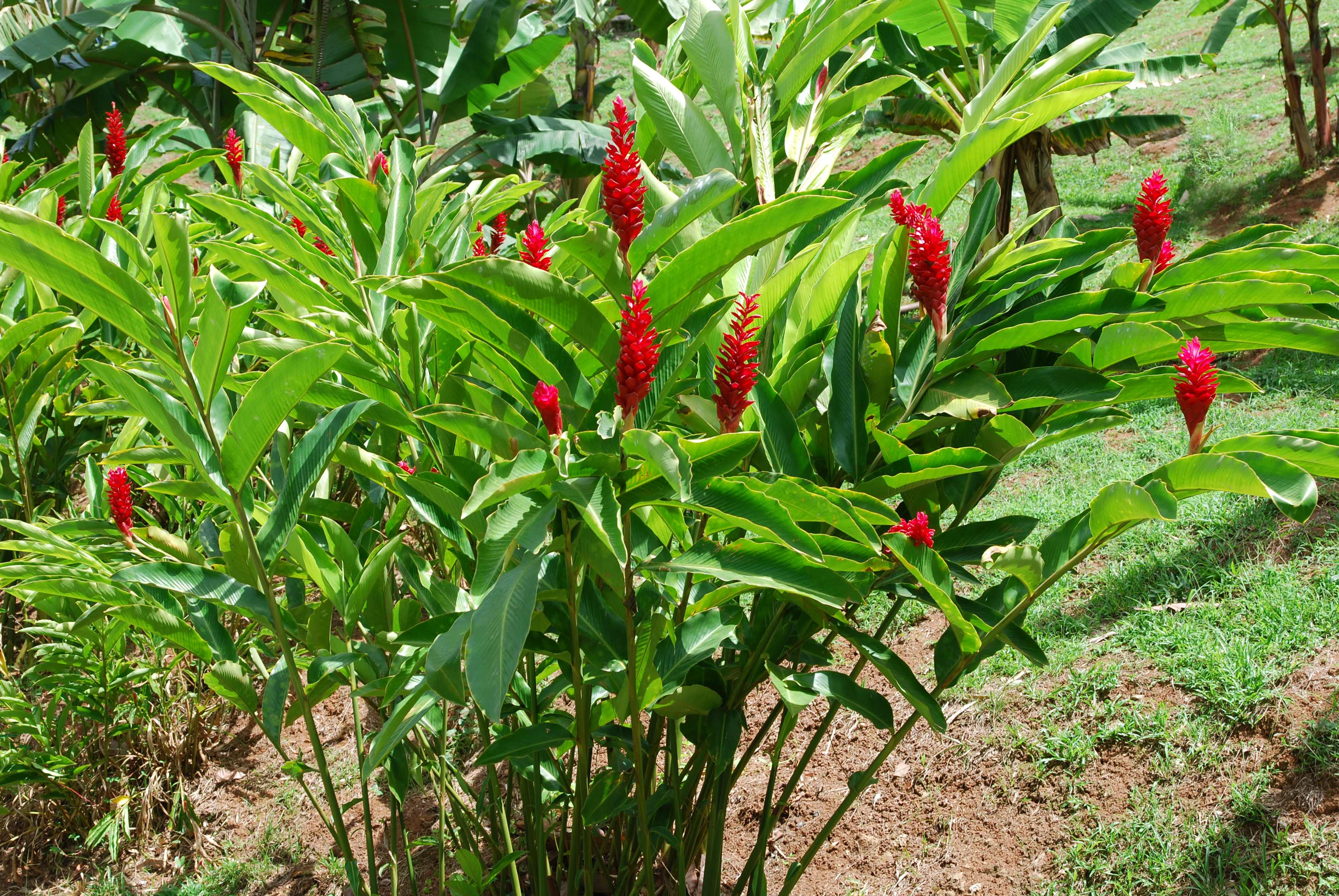
Alpinia purpurata

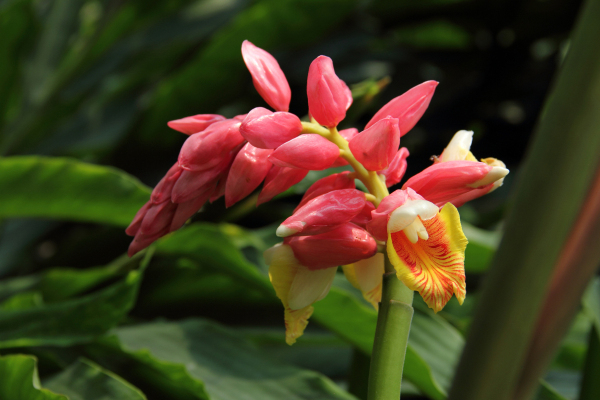
Alpinia hainanensis "Shengzhen" from Flower View

== See also ==
- alpinetin
- List of plants known as lily
