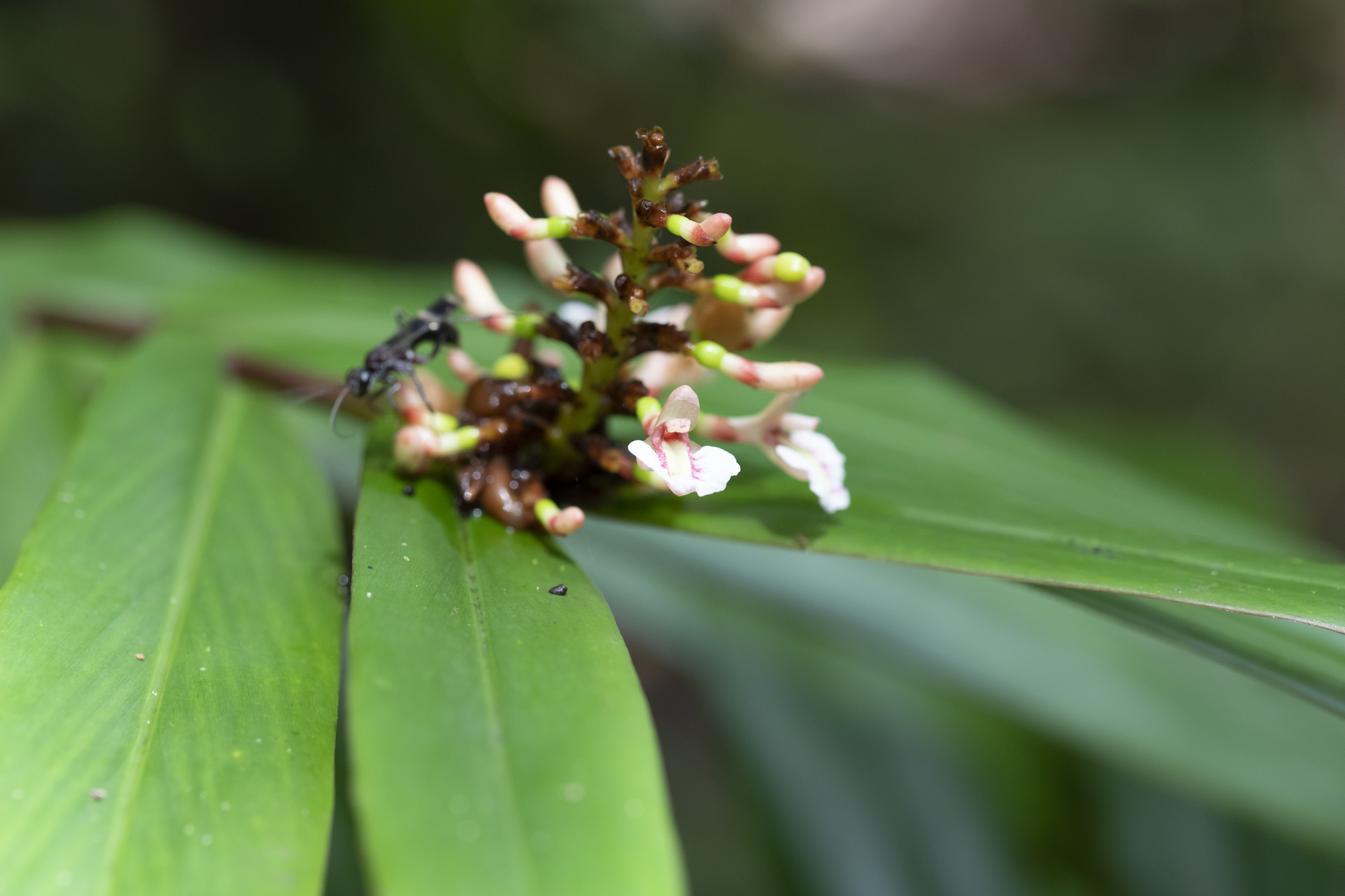

Conservation status
- Least Concern (NCA)

Scientific classification
- Kingdom: Plantae
- Clade: Embryophytes
- Clade: Tracheophytes
- Clade: Spermatophytes
- Clade: Angiosperms
- Clade: Monocots
- Clade: Commelinids
- Order: Zingiberales
- Family: Zingiberaceae
- Genus: Alpinia
- Species: A. modesta

Binomial name
- Alpinia modesta F.Muell. ex K.Schum.

= Alpinia modesta =

Species of plant in the family Zingiberaceae

Alpinia modesta (common name - narrow-leaf ginger) is a plant in the Zingiberaceae (ginger family). It was first described in 1904 by Ferdinand von Mueller.

It is native to Queensland, Australia.

== Gallery ==
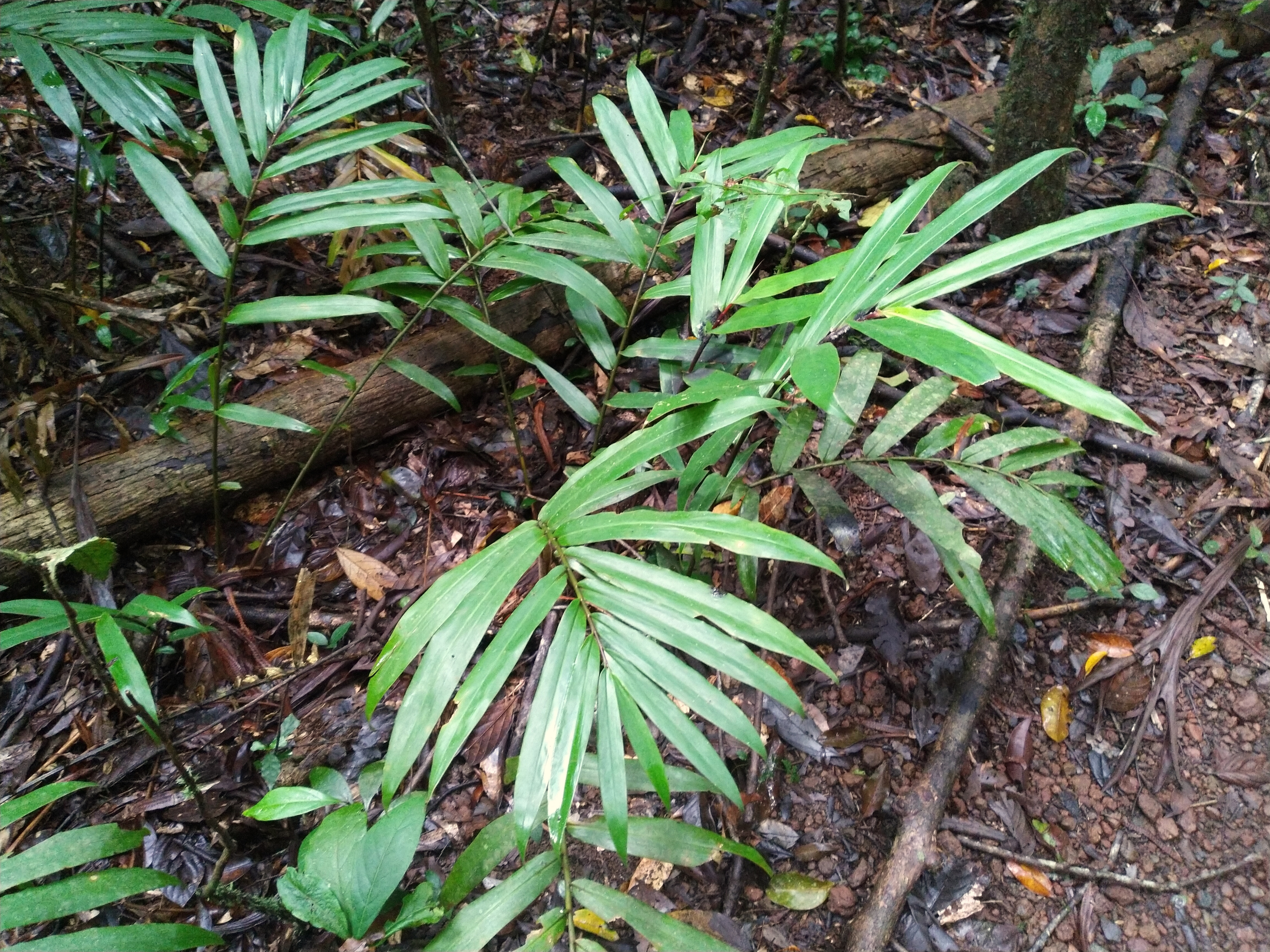

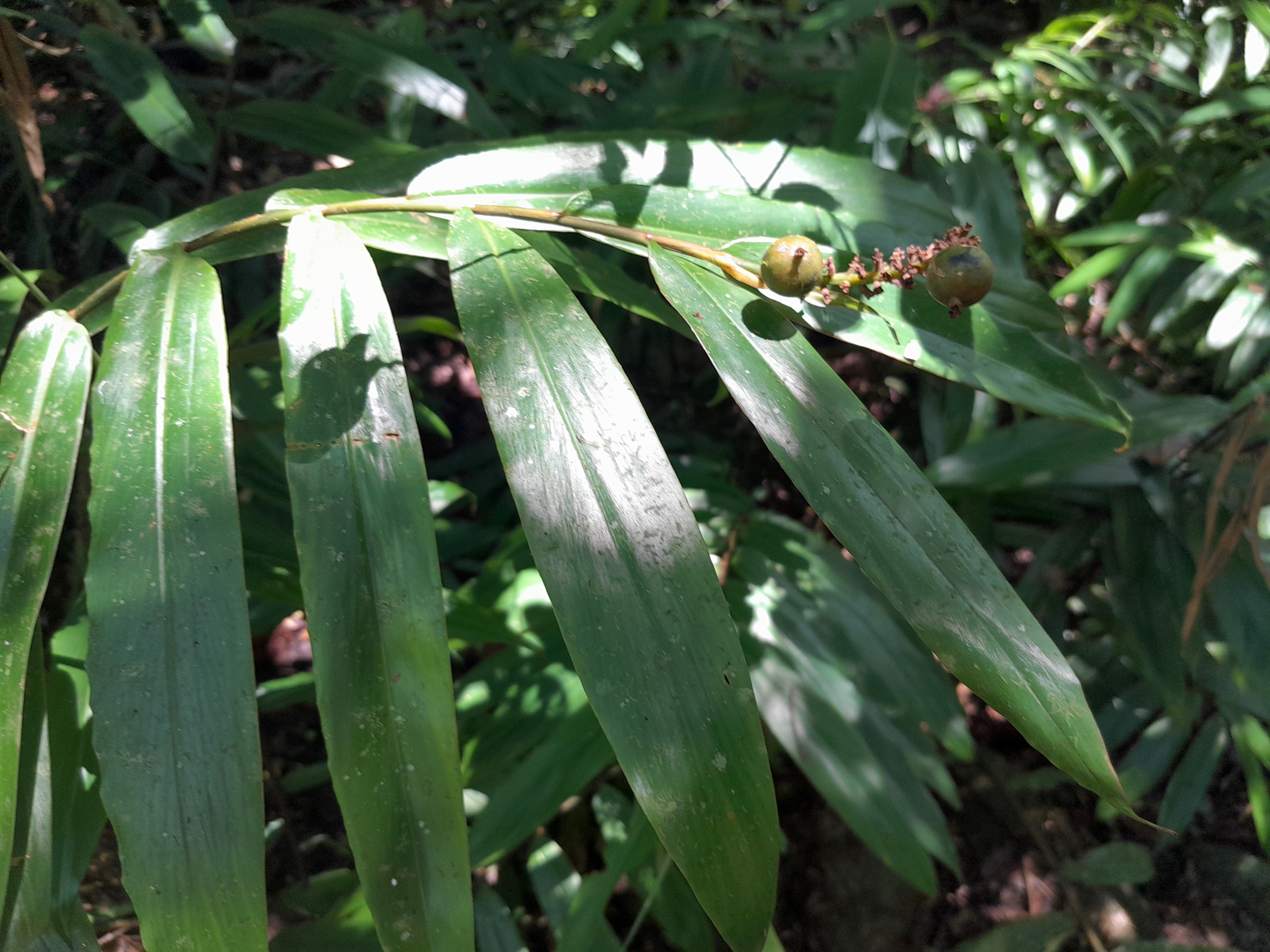

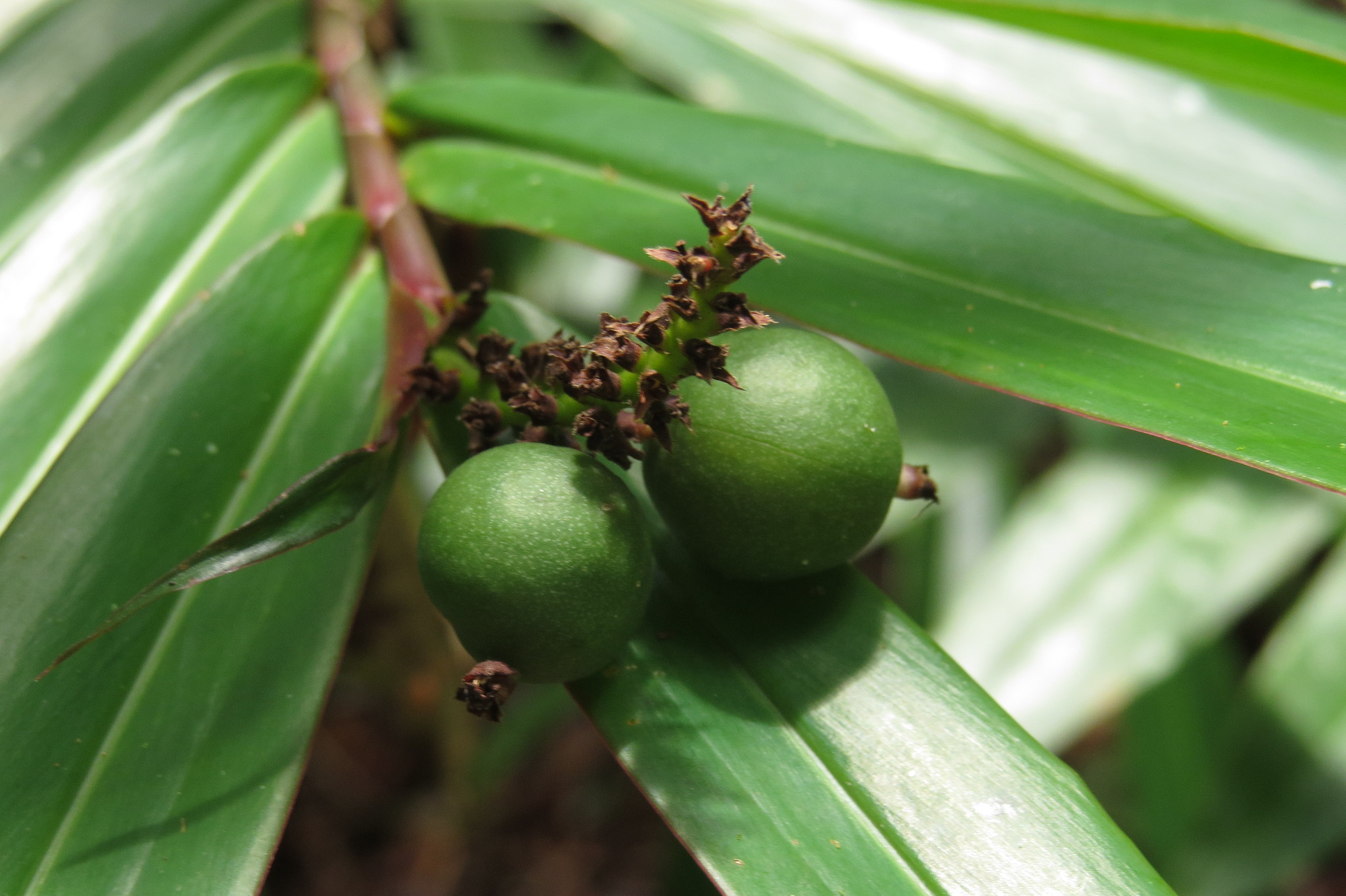
