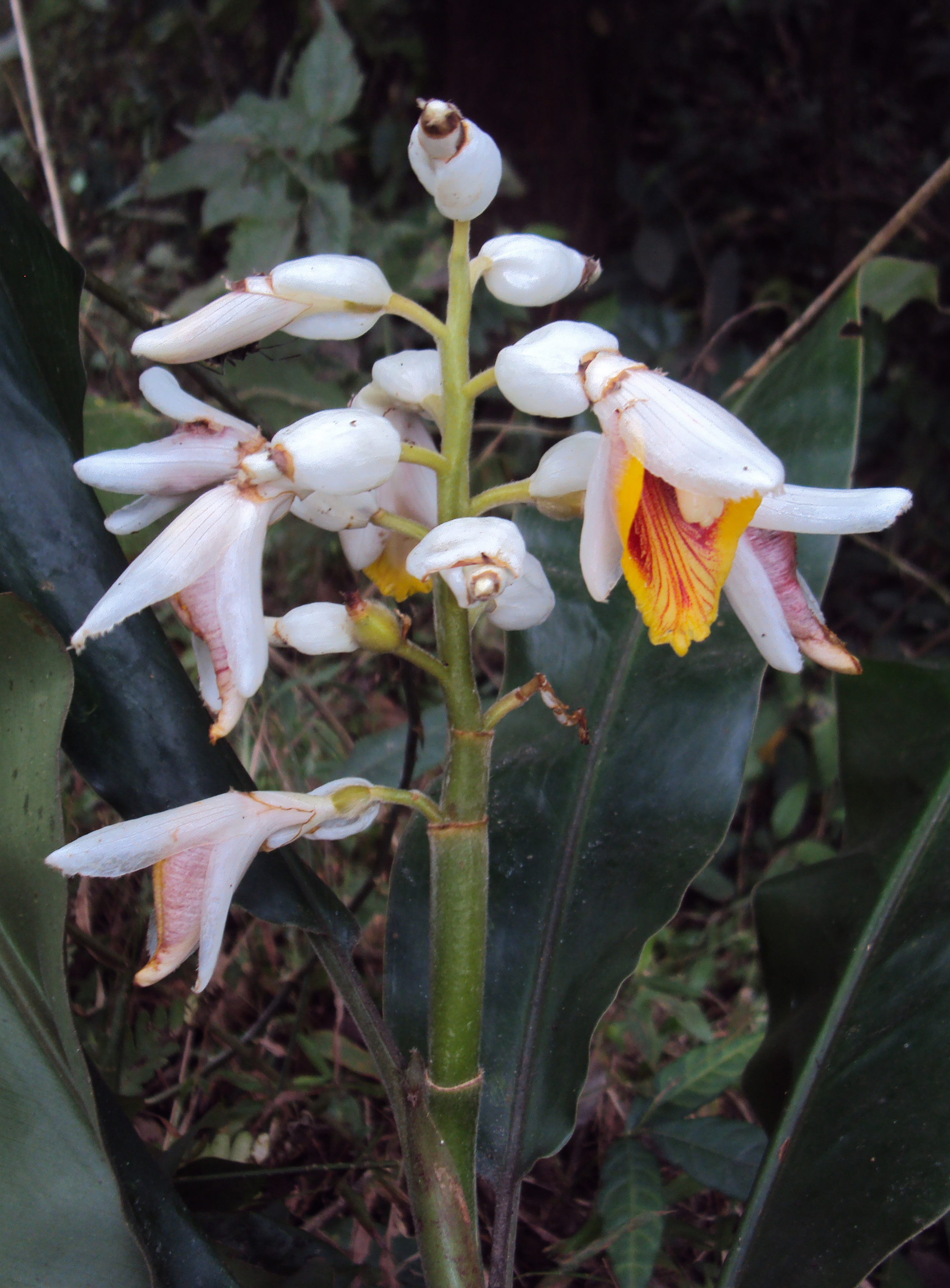
- Alpinia malaccensis plant

Conservation status
- Data Deficient (IUCN 3.1)

Scientific classification
- Kingdom: Plantae
- Clade: Tracheophytes
- Clade: Angiosperms
- Clade: Monocots
- Clade: Commelinids
- Order: Zingiberales
- Family: Zingiberaceae
- Genus: Alpinia
- Species: A. malaccensis

Binomial name
- Alpinia malaccensis (Burm.f.) Roscoe

Synonyms
- Buekia malaccensis (Burm.f.) Raeusch.; Catimbium malaccense (Burm.f.) Holttum; Costus malaccensis Koenig; Languas malaccensis (Burm.f.) Merr.; Maranta malaccensis Burm.f.

= Alpinia malaccensis =

Species of flowering plant

Alpinia malaccensis is a plant in the family Zingiberaceae cultivated for ornamental and medicinal purposes. It is a native of Indonesia and Malaysia. An oil is obtained from its leaves and rhizomes. It has many medicinal properties.
