= Alpinia petiolata =

Scientific classification
- Kingdom: Plantae
- Clade: Tracheophytes
- Clade: Angiosperms
- Clade: Monocots
- Clade: Commelinids
- Order: Zingiberales
- Family: Zingiberaceae
- Genus: Alpinia
- Species: A. petiolata

Binomial name
- Alpinia petiolata Baker

Species of flowering plant

Alpinia petiolata, the stalked-leaved alpinia, is a species of ginger native to Peninsular Malaysia. It was first described by John Gilbert Baker.
