= Alpinia rafflesiana =

Scientific classification
- Kingdom: Plantae
- Clade: Embryophytes
- Clade: Tracheophytes
- Clade: Angiosperms
- Clade: Monocots
- Clade: Commelinids
- Order: Zingiberales
- Family: Zingiberaceae
- Genus: Alpinia
- Species: A. rafflesiana

Binomial name
- Alpinia rafflesiana Wall. ex Baker

Species of flowering plant

Alpinia rafflesiana, commonly known in Malaysia as tepus telor, is a perennial herb belonging to the family Zingiberaceae. It is native to Peninsular Malaysia.

== Description ==
The herb typically grows 0.5 meters (1.5 ft) to 2 meters (6 ft) tall. The leaves are hairless and smooth on the upper surface and have light velvety hairs on the lower surface and margins in an alternating arrangement. It has an indeterminate inflorescence and is monoecious, with the female flower having 5 carpels and 5 stigmas and the male flowers having 5 anthers. Flowers are bright orange colored, measure between 4 and 4 ½ cm long with dark orange bracts and boat-shaped lobes; they lack petals and have a lily-like fragrance. The fruits are small, round, green, fleshy and contain one seed.

== Ecology ==
Alpinia rafflesiana is found in the secondary forest and tends to grow from sea level to 1,200 meters. This plant tends to grow best in environments with full to partial sunlight, and moist and fertile soil. The A. rafflesiana species is dispersed by wind and water, and the species is pollinated by birds, bees and bats.

== Cultivation and uses ==
Alpinia rafflesiana is mainly cultivated as a medicinal crop, growing the best in an environment containing moist and nutritious soil with either partial or full sunlight. The fruit of the A. rafflesiana plant is used as an anti-inflammatory and alternative cancer treatment by isolating cardamonin, a chemical that inhibits major signaling pathways found in inflammation and cancer. In neuroinflammatory disorders, the isolated cardamonin has been used to block the secretion of pro-inflammatory mediators. Cardamonin isolated from A. rafflesiana has shown to be successful in treating ulcers, nausea and vomiting, bacterial infections, fungal infections, low blood sugar, indigestion, and anxiety. The leaves, pseudo-stems, rhizomes, and fruit of the plant are used to produce essential oils with antimicrobial properties. The leaves of A. rafflesiana are commonly used to shrink and drain boils through poultice application.
