= Alpinetin =

Names
- IUPAC name (2S)-7-Hydroxy-5-methoxyflavan-4-one
- Systematic IUPAC name (2S)-7-Hydroxy-5-methoxy-2-phenyl-2,3-dihydro-4H-1-benzopyran-4-one
- Other names (2S)-7-Hydroxy-5-methoxy-2-phenyl-2,3-dihydro-4H-chromen-4-one

Identifiers
CAS Number	36052-37-6
3D model (JSmol)	Interactive image
ChEBI	CHEBI:449909
ChEMBL	ChEMBL537954
ChemSpider	135938
PubChem CID	154279
UNII	SX3EL59QD8
CompTox Dashboard (EPA)	DTXSID80189620
- InChI: InChI=1S/C16H14O4/c1-19-14-7-11(17)8-15-16(14)12(18)9-13(20-15)10-5-3-2-4-6-10/h2-8,13,17H,9H2,1H3/t13-/m0/s1 Key: QQQCWVDPMPFUGF-ZDUSSCGKSA-N; InChI=1S/C16H14O4/c1-19-14-7-11(17)8-15-16(14)12(18)9-13(20-15)10-5-3-2-4-6-10/h2-8,13,17H,9H2,1H3/t13-/m0/s1
- SMILES: O=C2c3c(O[C@H](c1ccccc1)C2)cc(O)cc3OC

Properties
Chemical formula	C_{16}H_{14}O_{4}
Molar mass	270.284 g·mol^{−1}
- Except where otherwise noted, data are given for materials in their standard state (at 25 °C [77 °F], 100 kPa). verify (what is ?) Infobox references

Alpinetin is a phytochemical isolated from a variety of plants including those of the genus Alpinia. It is going through tests to see if it is a vasorelaxant.
