= Alpinia globosa =

Scientific classification
- Kingdom: Plantae
- Clade: Tracheophytes
- Clade: Angiosperms
- Clade: Monocots
- Clade: Commelinids
- Order: Zingiberales
- Family: Zingiberaceae
- Genus: Alpinia
- Species: A. globosa

Binomial name
- Alpinia globosa (Lour.) Horan.

Synonyms
- Amomum globosum Lour.; Cardamomum globosum (Lour.) Kuntze; Languas globosa (Lour.) Burkill in Gard. Bull. Straits Settlem. 6: 80 (1929); Zingiber globosum (Lour.) Stokes

Species of flowering plant

Alpinia globosa is a species of flowering plant in the ginger family, Zingiberaceae. It is sometimes referred to by the common name round Chinese cardamom and is native to South-Central China, and Vietnam. It was first described by João de Loureiro, and got its current name from Paul Fedorowitsch Horaninow.
