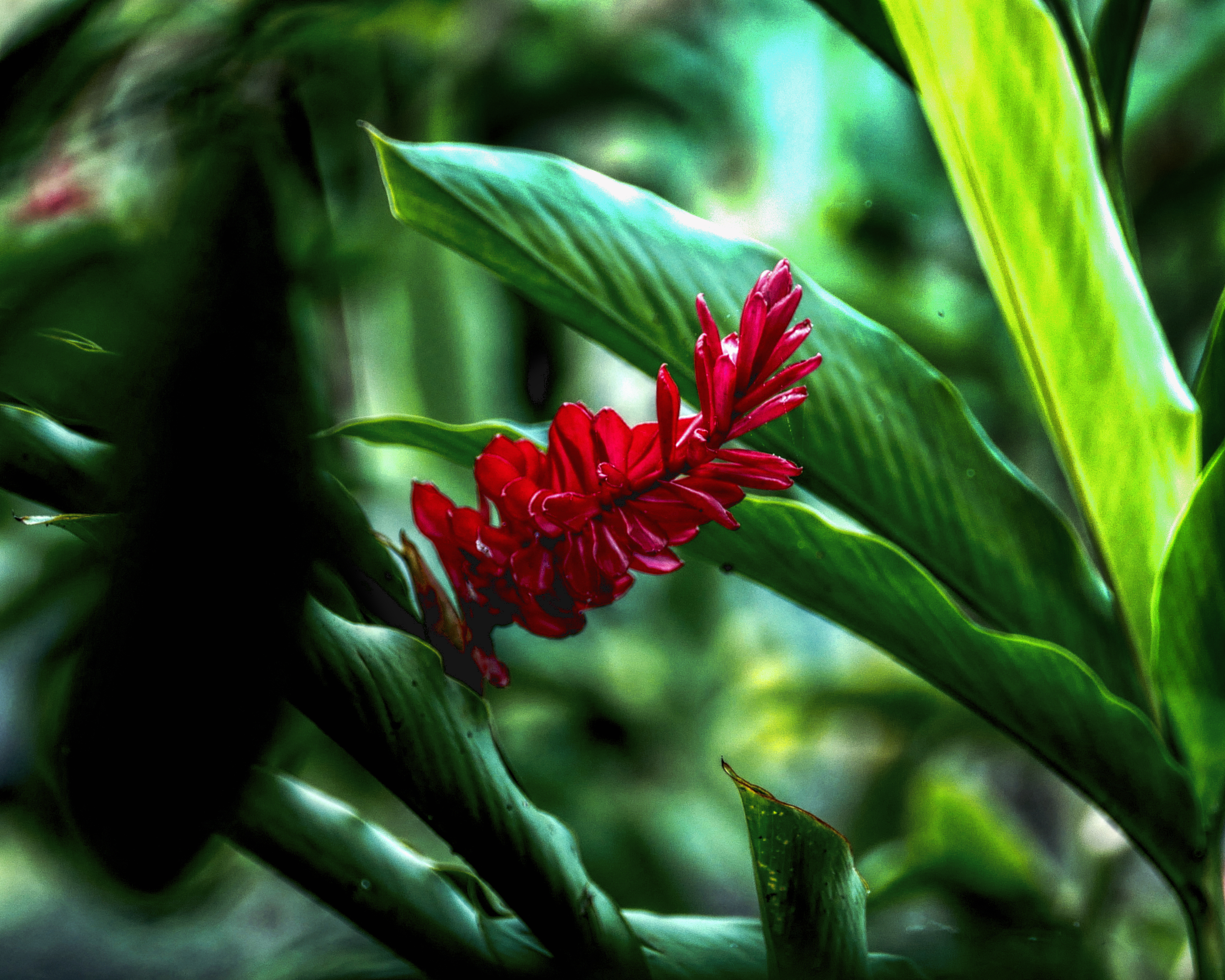

Scientific classification
- Kingdom: Plantae
- Clade: Tracheophytes
- Clade: Angiosperms
- Clade: Monocots
- Clade: Commelinids
- Order: Zingiberales
- Family: Zingiberaceae
- Genus: Alpinia
- Species: A. purpurata

Binomial name
- Alpinia purpurata K.Schum.

= Alpinia purpurata =

Red ginger

Species of flowering plant

Alpinia purpurata, commonly referred to as red ginger, ostrich plume and pink cone ginger, is a ginger native to Maluku and the southwest Pacific islands. In typical ginger fashion, A. purpurata is a rhizomatous plant, spreading underground in a horizontal growth habit, sending feeder roots downwards into the substrate and sprouting leafy vertical stems from nodes located along the rhizome. As its common name implies, red ginger blooms with showy inflorescences on long, bright magenta- to red-hued bracts; while they appear to be a blossom, bracts are in fact modified leaves that contain the plant's actual flowers. Bracts are a common feature of many botanical genera (such as Euphorbia sp. or the Araceae family), having evolved to protect and resemble the flowers and appeal to pollinators. The actual flower "parts" (pollen, pistil, stamen, etc.) are located inside, often accessed by crawling insects like ants or beetles.

Red ginger has several cultivars, such as A. purpurata 'Jungle King' and 'Jungle Queen'. The plant grows in many regions outside of its native southwest Pacific islands, including the countries and territories of Dominica, Grenada, Guadeloupe, Hawaii, Jamaica, Martinique, Puerto Rico, St. Lucia, St. Vincent, Suriname (where its Dutch name is bokkepoot, or "billy-goat's foot") and Trinidad and Tobago. It is also found in several Central American nations, including Belize and Panama. It is the national flower of Samoa, where it is locally called teuila.

Red ginger can also be grown successfully in the United States, in places such as South Florida and coastal Southern California, as these regions' winter low temperatures do not typically reach freezing, usually dropping no lower than 45°-50 °F (about 7°-10 °C) at the coldest points of the year. Additionally, the plant may require extra overhead sun protection, as well as irrigation, in drier, hotter or sunnier climes outside its native range; as with many ginger species, red ginger prefers partial shade, indirect light and consistently moist—but not saturated—soil conditions, with preferably high levels of ambient humidity. If care is provided that the leaves do not sunburn, the red ginger can tolerate a few hours of full sun, earlier in the day. Extra light may help to stimulate more vivid foliage and vibrant blooms. In addition to planting in outdoor landscapes, red ginger may also be grown as an indoor houseplant (if provided with adequate light exposure). It can be successfully conditioned to grow in LECA or PON (in full, passive or semi-hydroponic setups). Its cut flowers and leaves are often used in floral arrangements and tropical bouquets.

In Hawaii, the flowers of red ginger are grown commercially for sale, and have been associated with the Hamakua area for a long time. Once a very common flower regionally, the gardening community there has experienced a slight decline in recent years, though is starting to make a comeback. Red ginger blooms are also, sometimes, called "graveyard flowers" as they are customarily placed at loved ones' headstones, lasting for quite a while thanks to their vigor & long shelf-life as a cut flower.

== Gallery ==
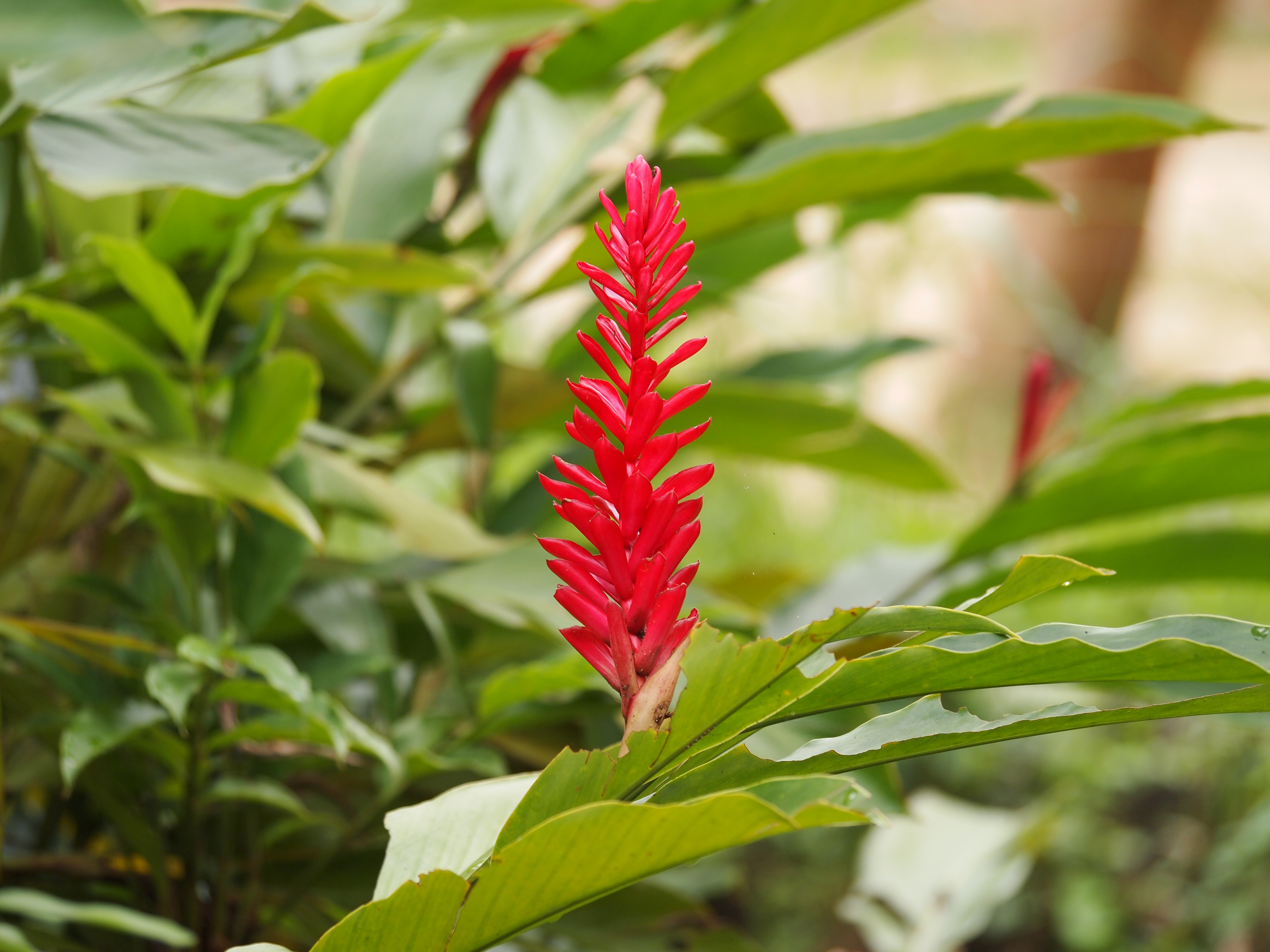
Red ginger flower; Malaysia.

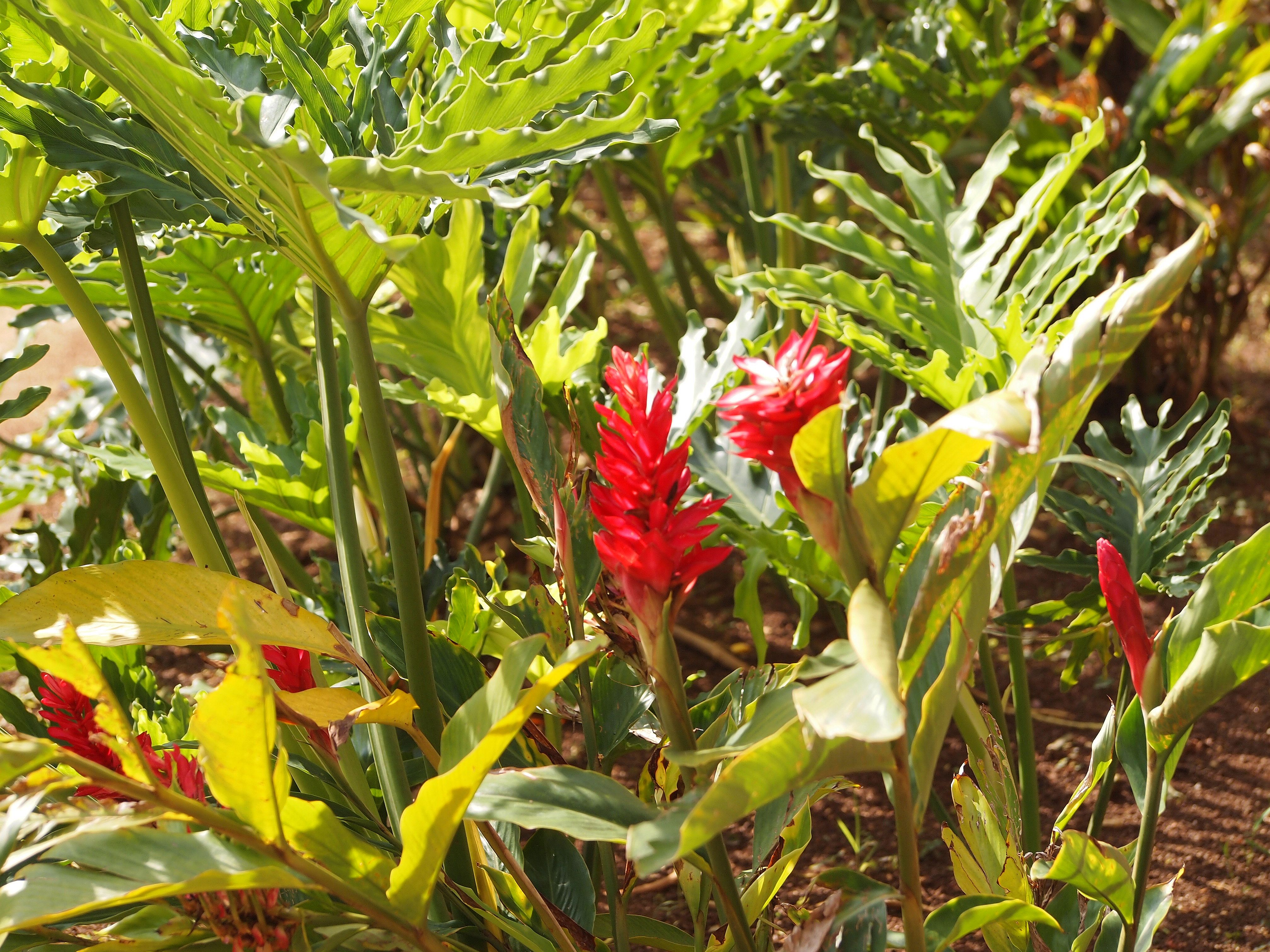
Alpinia purpurata; Malaysia.

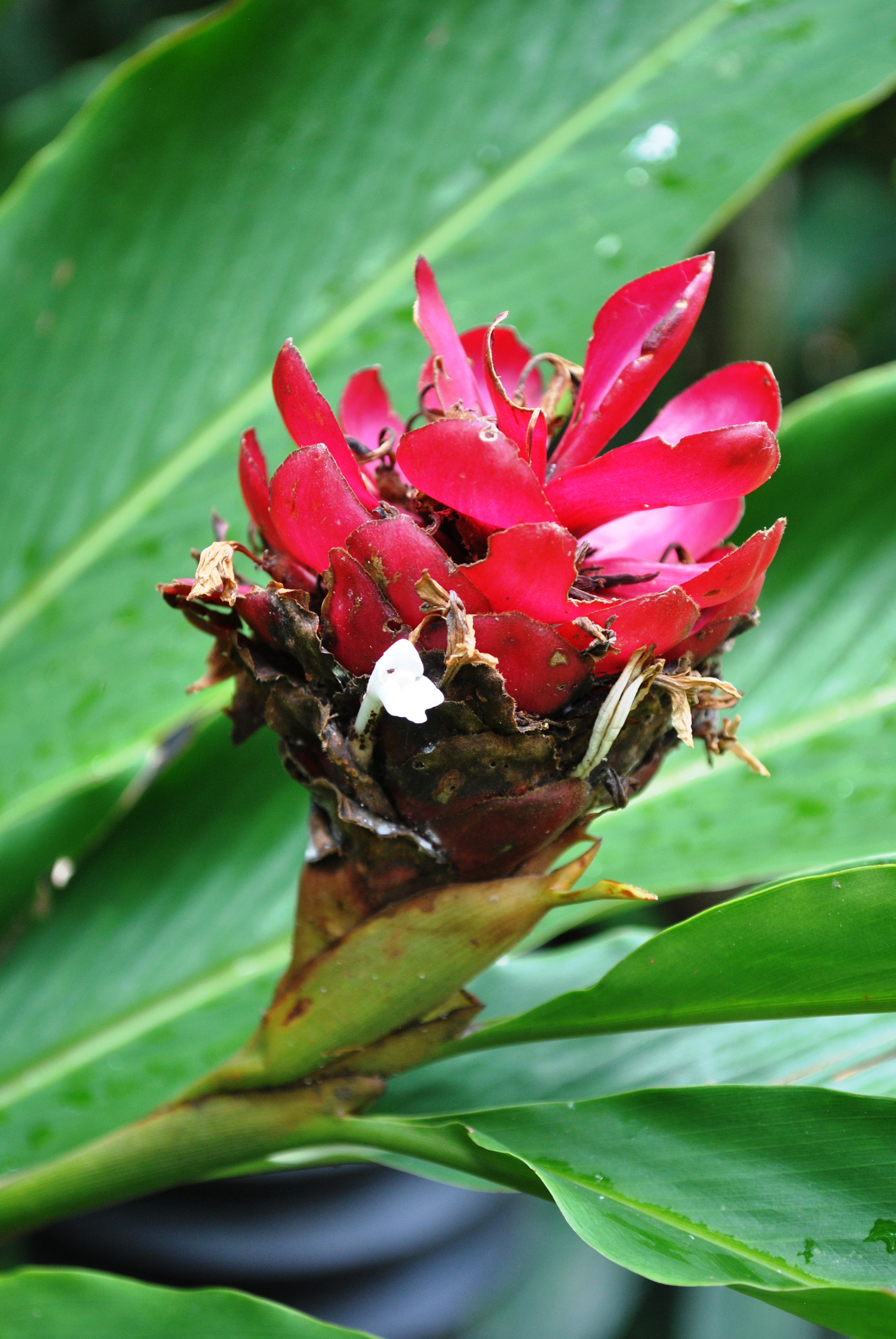
A. purpurata; Singapore Botanic Gardens.

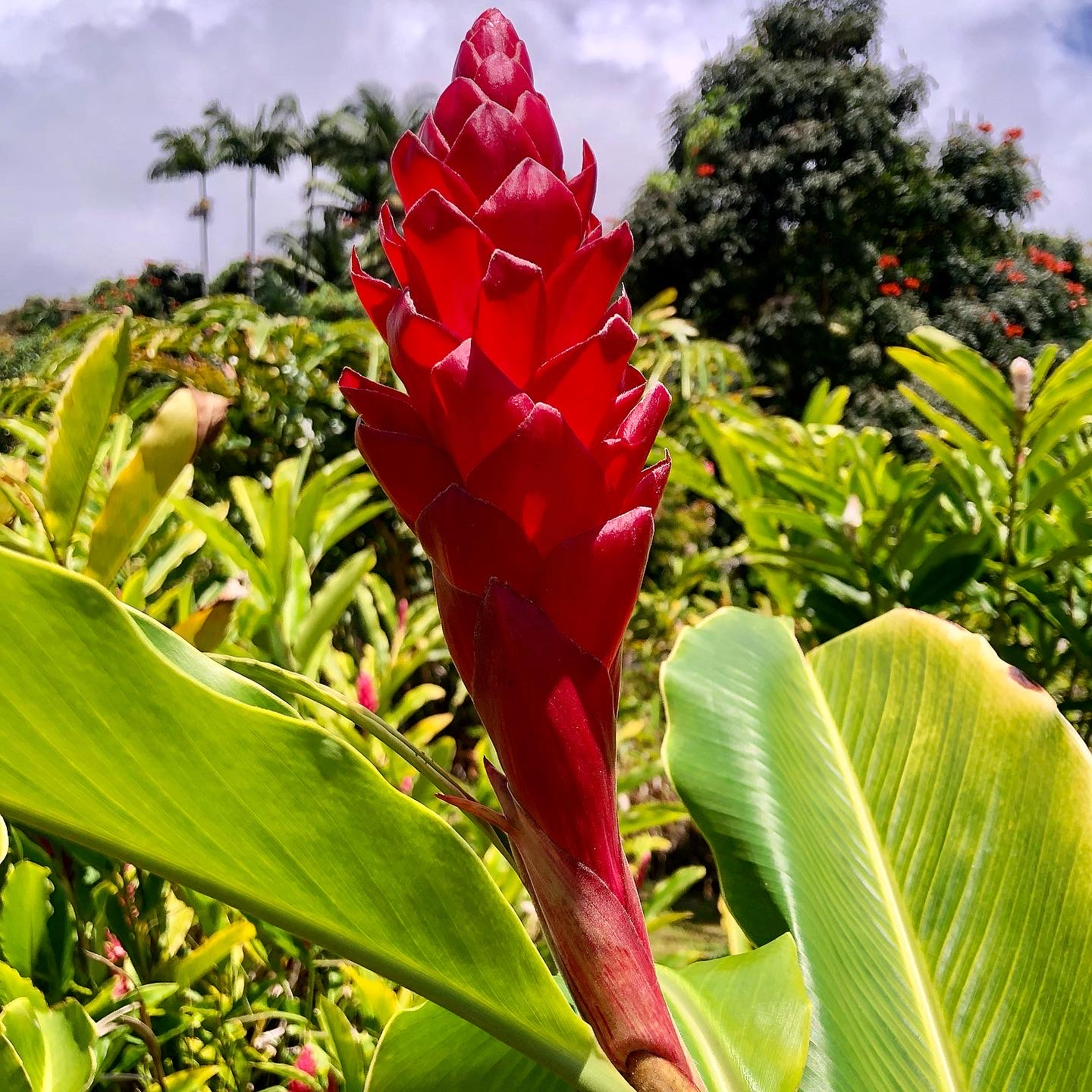
Emergent bloom at a plant nursery, Hamakua coast, Hawaii.

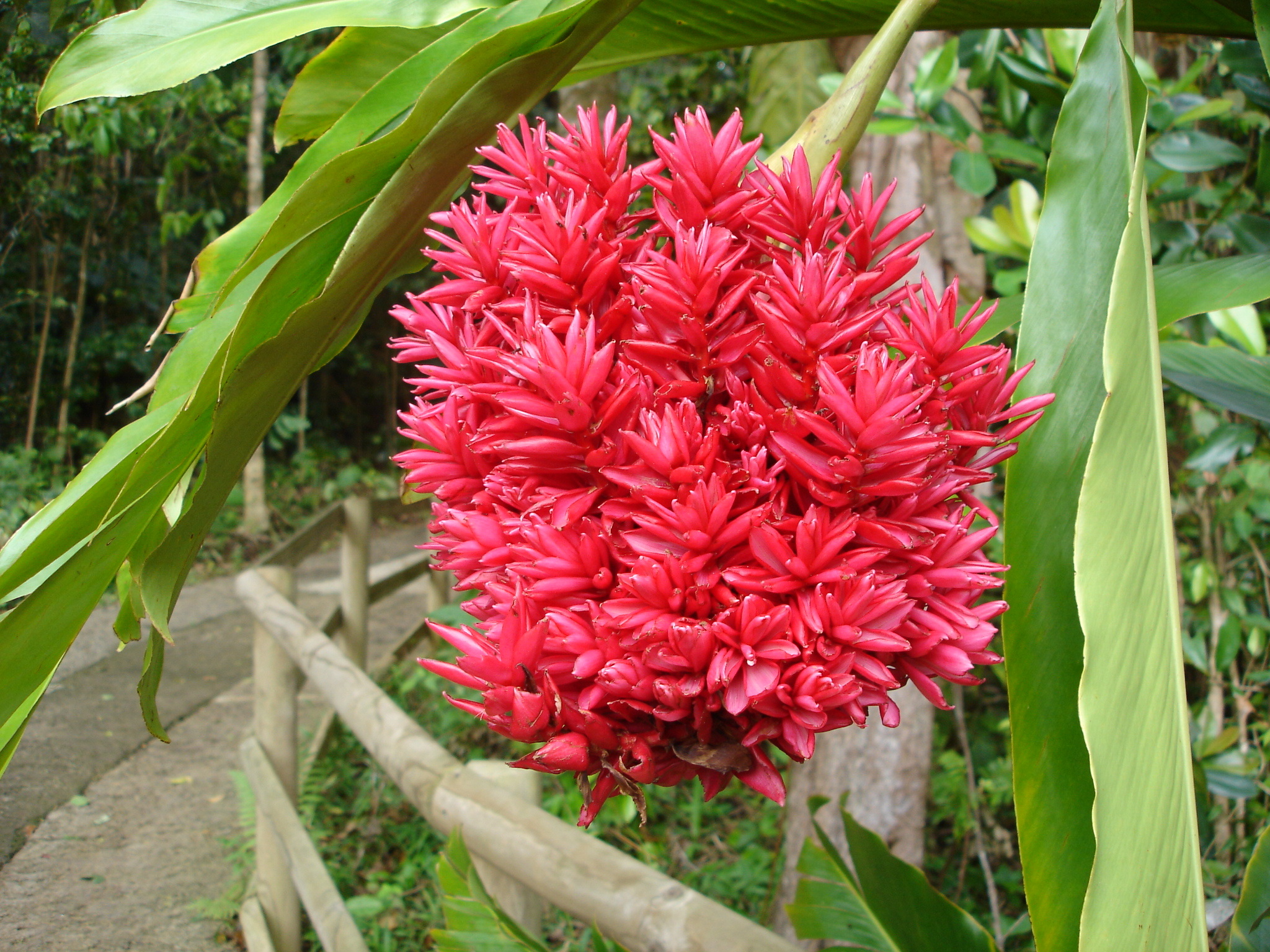
Branching red ginger flower in Guadeloupe (double-flowered form, A. purpurata cv. 'Tahitian Ginger').

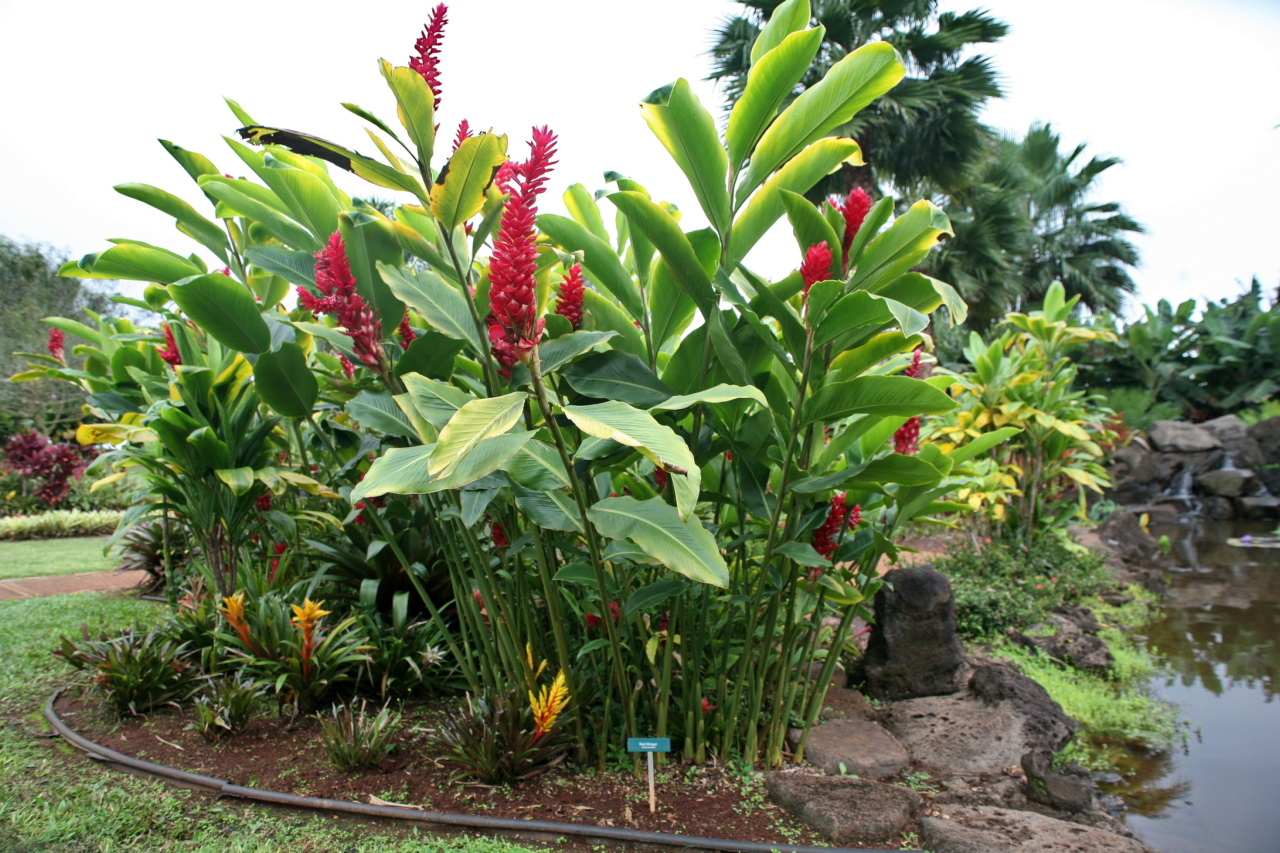
Fully grown, mature stand of A. purpurata.

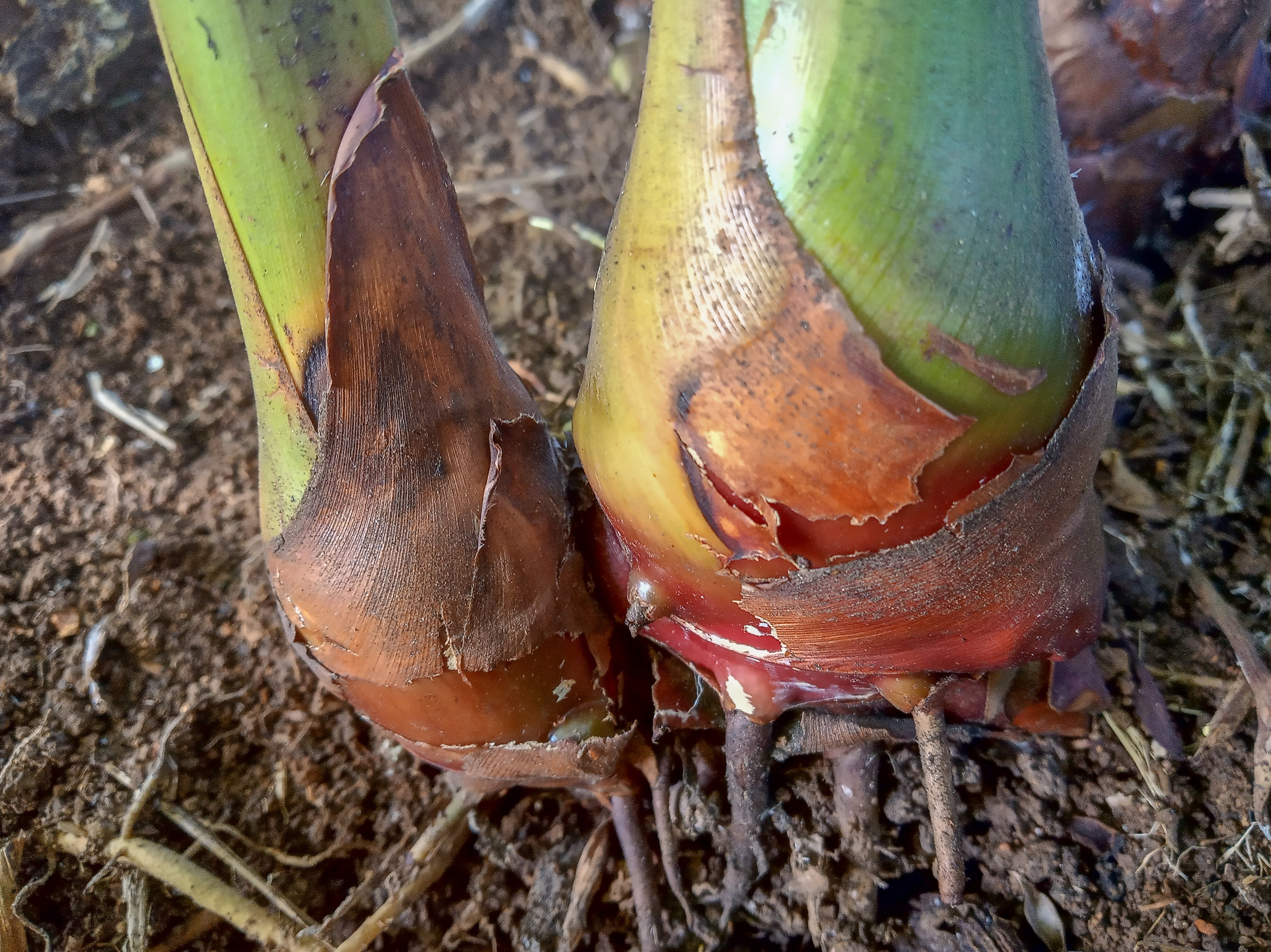
Harvested plants showing root growth from rhizome.

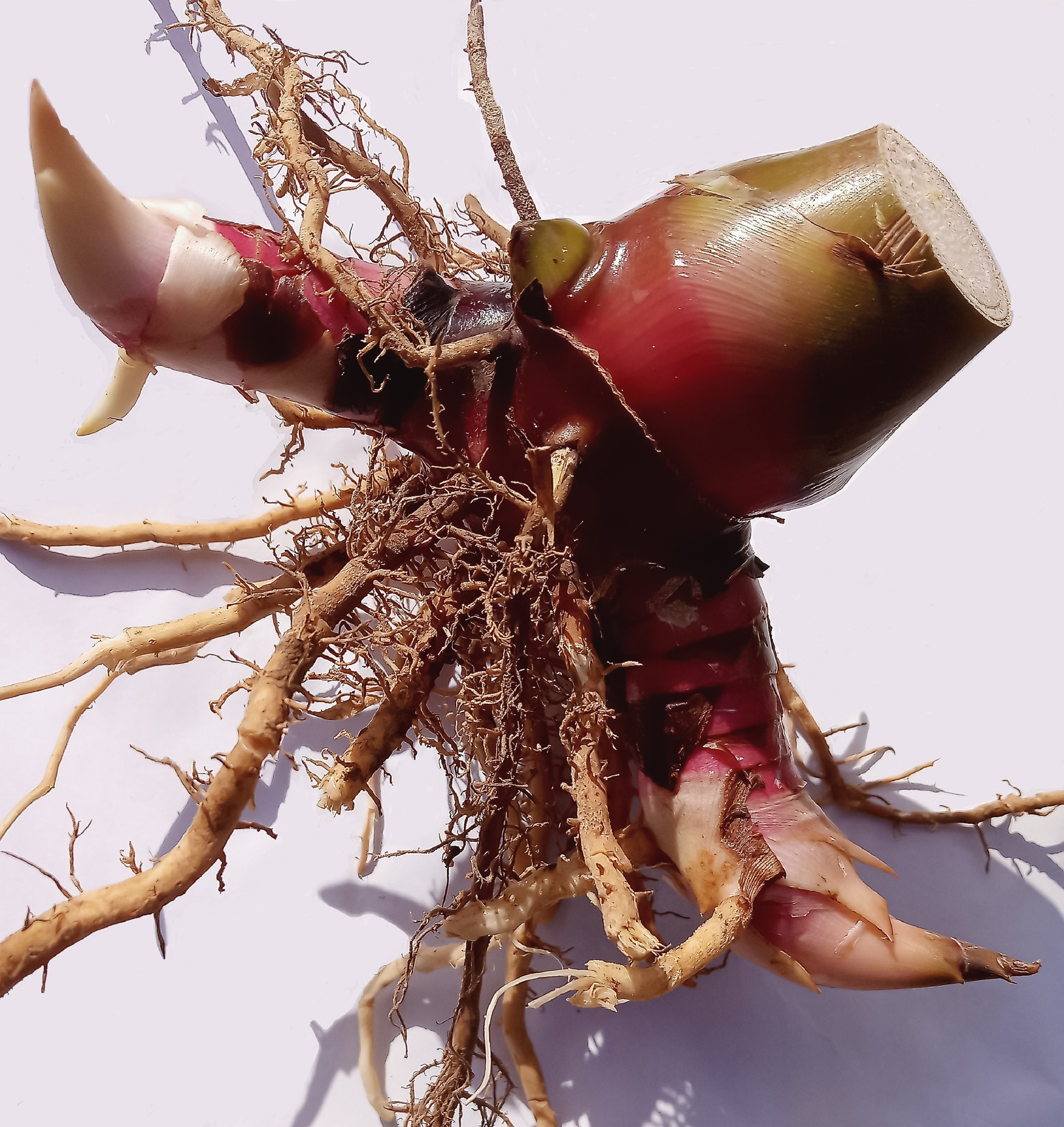
Cross-section view of roots and rhizome, with stem and leaves pruned and new stem sprouts visible on the sides.

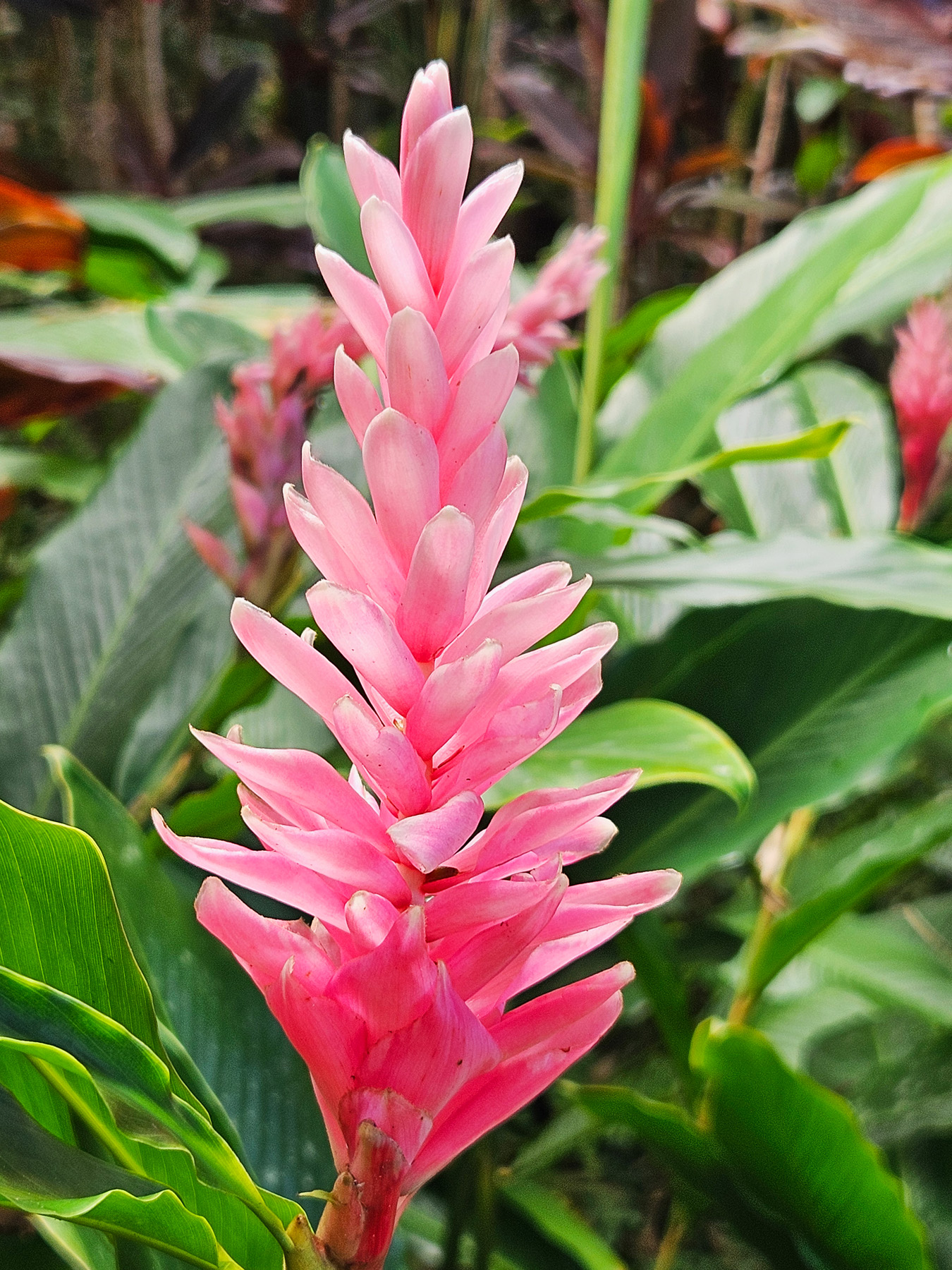
Alpinia purpurata (Vieill.) K.Schum. (Hawaii)

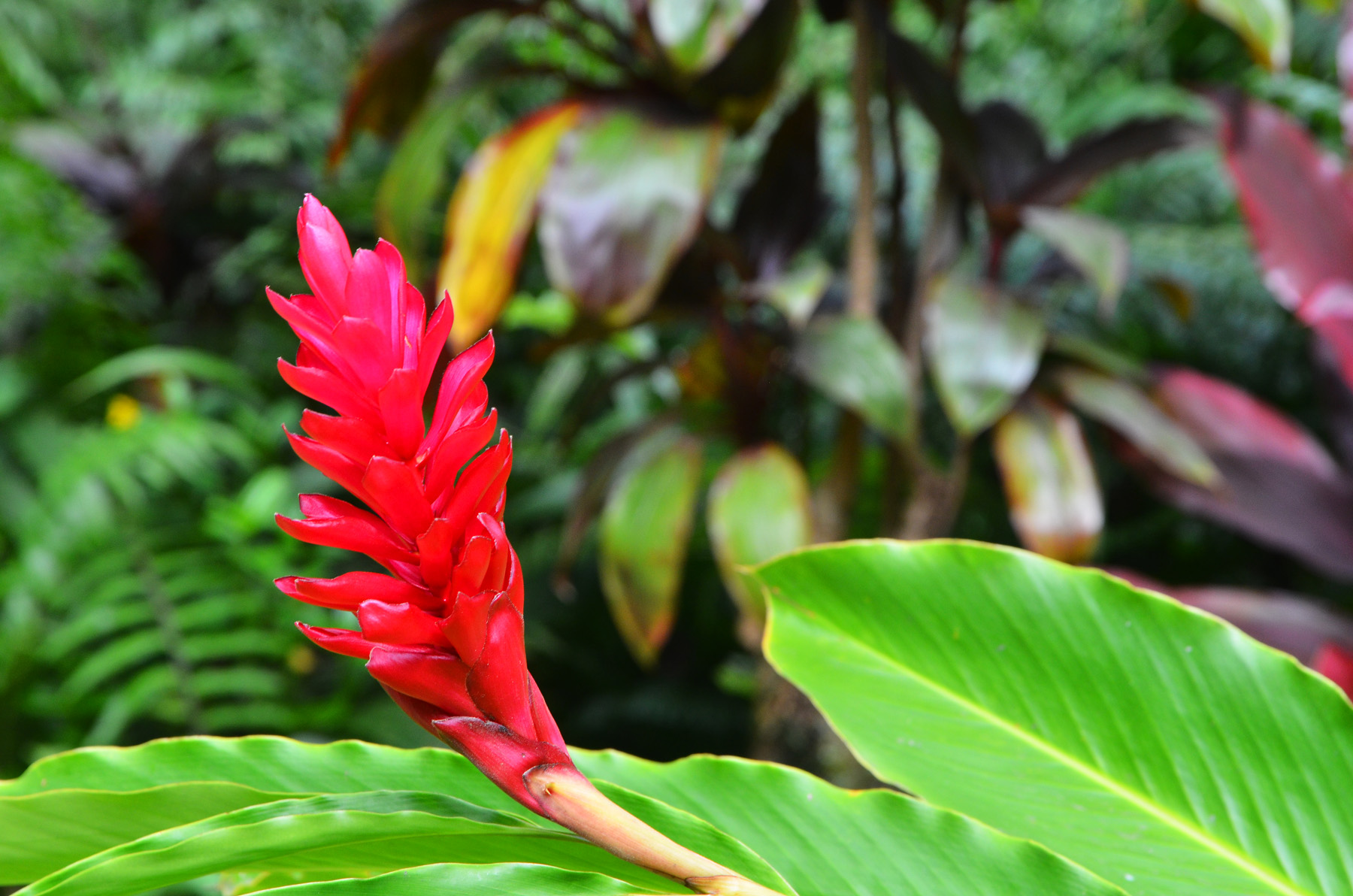
Alpinia purpurata (Big Island)
