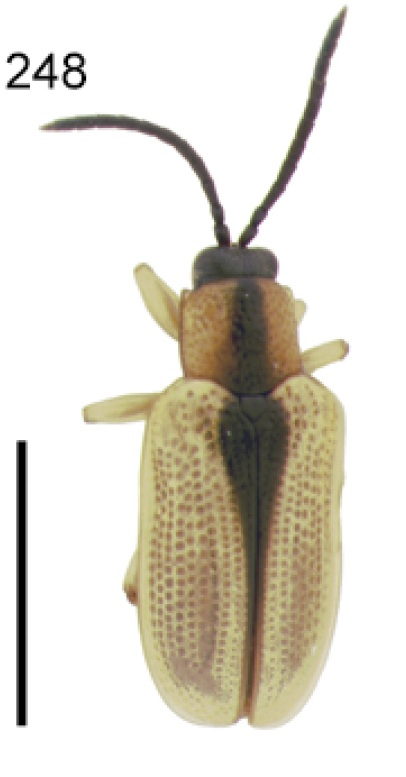

Scientific classification
- Kingdom: Animalia
- Phylum: Arthropoda
- Class: Insecta
- Order: Coleoptera
- Suborder: Polyphaga
- Infraorder: Cucujiformia
- Family: Chrysomelidae
- Genus: Cephaloleia
- Species: C. suturalis

Binomial name
- Cephaloleia suturalis Baly, 1885

= Cephaloleia suturalis =

Species of beetle

Cephaloleia suturalis is a species of beetle of the family Chrysomelidae. It is found in Costa Rica, Guatemala and Nicaragua.

== Description ==
Adults reach a length of about 4.9–5.1 mm. The head, antennae and scutellum are black, while the pronotum is yellowish with a medial black vitta from the base to the apex. The elytron is yellowish with a black sutural vitta. The legs are yellowish-brown.

== Biology ==
The recorded host plants are Costus species (including Costus malortieanus), Cephaloleia pulverulentus and Cephaloleia laevis.
