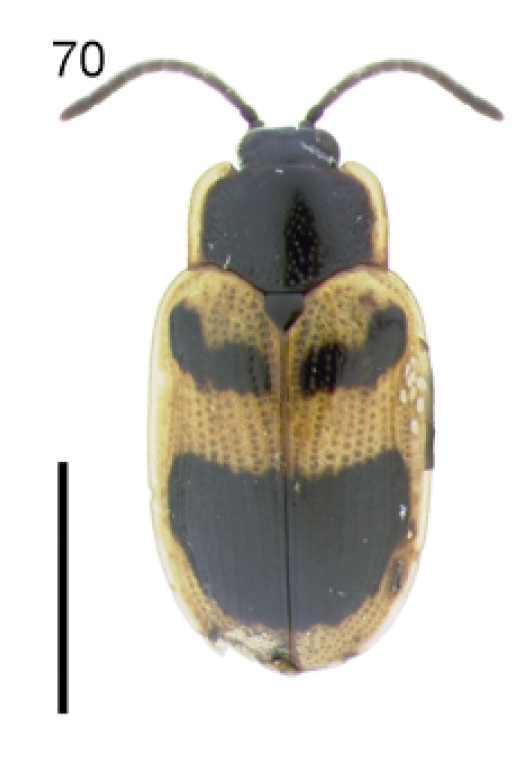

Scientific classification
- Kingdom: Animalia
- Phylum: Arthropoda
- Class: Insecta
- Order: Coleoptera
- Suborder: Polyphaga
- Infraorder: Cucujiformia
- Family: Chrysomelidae
- Genus: Cephaloleia
- Species: C. amba

Binomial name
- Cephaloleia amba Staines, 2014

= Cephaloleia amba =

Species of beetle

Cephaloleia amba is a species of beetle of the family Chrysomelidae. It is found in Colombia, Ecuador and Peru.

== Description ==
Adults reach a length of about 4.9–5.6 mm. The head, scutellum and pronotum (except the lateral margin) are black and the elytron is pale yellow with a black irregular transverse band and the apical half (except the lateral and apical margins) black.

== Biology ==
The hostplant is unknown, but adults have been collected on Costus species.

== Etymology ==
The species name is derived from Greek ambon (meaning edge) and refers to the pale flange of the pronotum and elytra.
