= Costus geothyrsus =

Conservation status
- Critically Endangered (IUCN 3.1)

Scientific classification
- Kingdom: Plantae
- Clade: Tracheophytes
- Clade: Angiosperms
- Clade: Monocots
- Clade: Commelinids
- Order: Zingiberales
- Family: Costaceae
- Genus: Costus
- Species: C. geothyrsus

Binomial name
- Costus geothyrsus K.Schum

Species of flowering plant

Costus geothyrsus is a critically endangered species of plant endemic to Ecuador. It is found in only one unprotected locale, in disturbed and secondary growth forest at low elevation. The flowers are similar to those of Costus pulverulentus.
