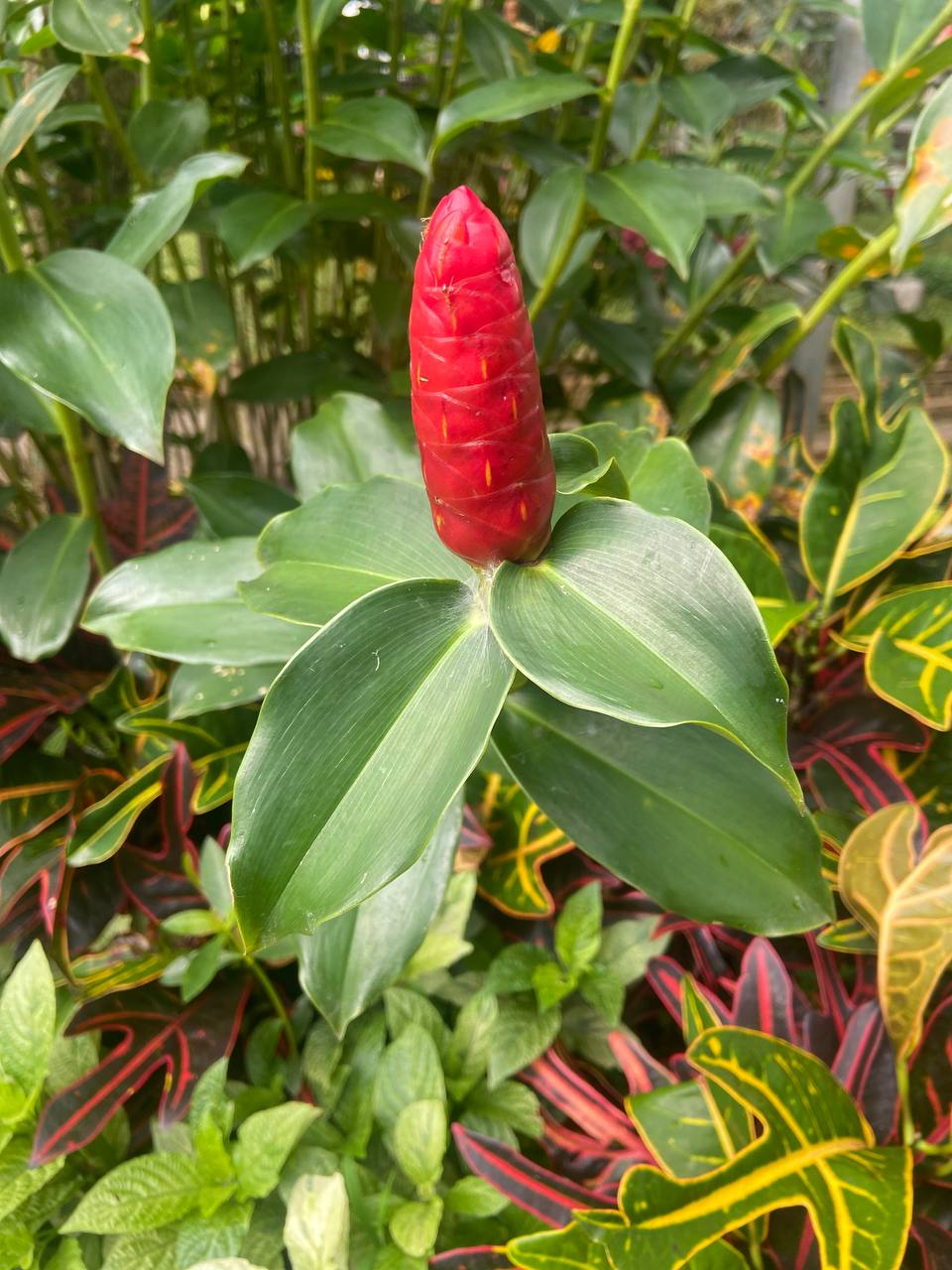
- Costus spicatus in Singapore

Scientific classification
- Kingdom: Plantae
- Clade: Tracheophytes
- Clade: Angiosperms
- Clade: Monocots
- Clade: Commelinids
- Order: Zingiberales
- Family: Costaceae
- Genus: Costus
- Species: C. spicatus

Binomial name
- Costus spicatus Jacq.

Synonyms
- Alpinia spicata; Costus cylindricus

= Costus spicatus =

Spiked spiralflag ginger Indian head ginger

Species of flowering plant

Costus spicatus, also known as spiked spiralflag ginger or Indian head ginger, is a species of herbaceous plant in the Costaceae family (also sometimes placed in Zingiberaceae). Common names in the Antilles include cumani, gengibre cimarron, gengibrillo, canne d’eau, and la canne de rivière.

== Distribution ==
Costus spicatus is native to some islands of the Caribbean (including Dominica, Guadeloupe, Hispaniola, Martinique, and Puerto Rico). There has been some confusion about the native range of Costus spicatus. Kew Botanical Gardens lists it as native to Mexico. It has been described as exotic or native to Cuba. Costus spicatus is possibly invasive in lower montane rainforests on Saint Lucia, where botanist Roger Graveson considers it to be an escaped exotic.

== Description ==
Costus spicatus leaves grow to a length of approximately 1 ft (30 cm) and a width of approximately 4 in (10 cm). It produces a short red cone, from which red-orange flowers emerge one at a time. In botanical literature, Costus woodsonii has often been misidentified as Costus spicatus. Costus spicatus is also similar in appearance to Costus scaber and Costus spiralis.

== Cultivation ==
Costus spicatus will grow in full sun if it is kept moist. It reaches a maximum height of about 6 to 7 feet (1.8 to 2.1 m).

== Ecology ==
Costus spicatus can develop a symbiotic partnership with certain species of ants (often only a single species of ant will be compatible). The ants are provided with a food source (nectar in C. spicatus flowers) as well as a place to construct a nest. In turn, the ants protect developing seeds from herbivorous insects.

== Use ==
Costus spicatus has several traditional uses. According to the Lacandon Maya, Costus spicatus increases soil fertility, is edible, and is a medicine. Other groups also use it in traditional medicine. The Totonac people use Costus spicatus to treat kidney problems and hepatitis. In Trinidad, it has been used to treat sexually transmitted infections. In São Tomé, it is known to be used as a diuretic.

In Dominican folk medicine, an herbal tea made from the leaves of C. spicatus is used for diabetes (hyperglycemia). However, a 2009 study concluded that C. spicatus tea "...had no efficacy in the treatment of obesity-induced hyperglycemia."
