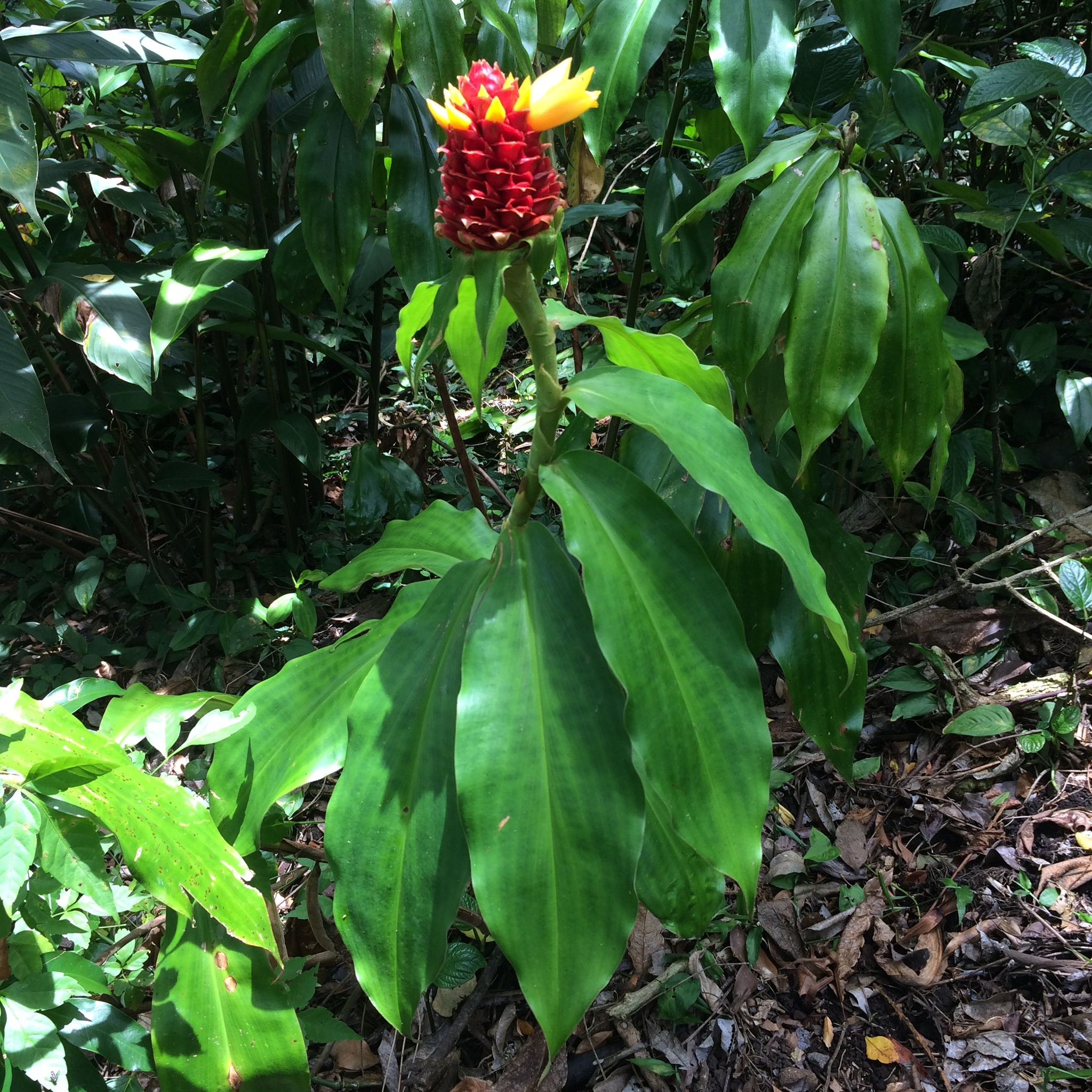

Conservation status
- Near Threatened (IUCN 3.1)

Scientific classification
- Kingdom: Plantae
- Clade: Tracheophytes
- Clade: Angiosperms
- Clade: Monocots
- Clade: Commelinids
- Order: Zingiberales
- Family: Costaceae
- Genus: Costus
- Species: C. montanus

Binomial name
- Costus montanus Maas

= Costus montanus =

Species of flowering plant

Costus montanus is a near threatened species of plant endemic to Costa Rica. It grows in moist cloud forests at middle altitudes, in the shade and along streams. Costus montanus was first described by Paul Maas in 1972.

Costus montanus is sometimes confused with other Costus species such as Costus barbatus and Costus ricus.
