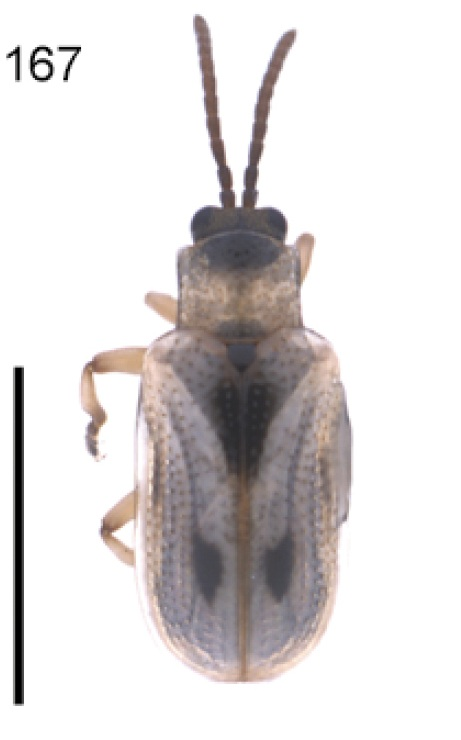

Scientific classification
- Kingdom: Animalia
- Phylum: Arthropoda
- Class: Insecta
- Order: Coleoptera
- Suborder: Polyphaga
- Infraorder: Cucujiformia
- Family: Chrysomelidae
- Genus: Cephaloleia
- Species: C. interrupta

Binomial name
- Cephaloleia interrupta García-Robledo & Staines, 2014

= Cephaloleia interrupta =

Species of beetle

Cephaloleia interrupta is a species of beetle of the family Chrysomelidae. It is found in Costa Rica.

== Description ==
Adults reach a length of about 4.3–4.5 mm. The head and scutellum are black, while the antennae are pitchy-brown. The pronotum and legs are pale yellowish and the elytron is pale yellowish with a short black vitta and an elongate oval black macula behind middle.

== Biology ==
Adults have been collected off Costus species.

== Etymology ==
The species name is derived from Latin interruptum and refers to the interrupted elytral puncture rows at the base.
