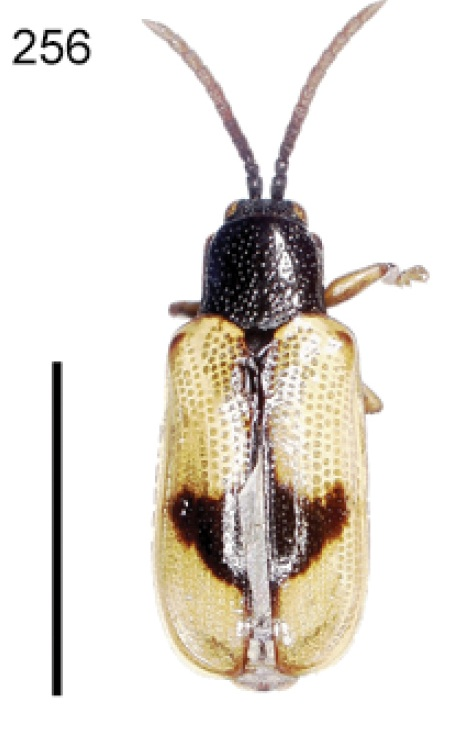

Scientific classification
- Kingdom: Animalia
- Phylum: Arthropoda
- Class: Insecta
- Order: Coleoptera
- Suborder: Polyphaga
- Infraorder: Cucujiformia
- Family: Chrysomelidae
- Genus: Cephaloleia
- Species: C. trimaculata

Binomial name
- Cephaloleia trimaculata Baly, 1858

Synonyms
- Cephalolia trimaculata columbica Weise, 1913

= Cephaloleia trimaculata =

Species of beetle

Cephaloleia trimaculata is a species of beetle of the family Chrysomelidae. It is found in Colombia, Costa Rica, Ecuador, French Guiana, Panama and Venezuela.

== Description ==
Adults reach a length of about 4.6–4.8 mm. The head, pronotum and scutellum are black. Antennomeres 1–2 are also black, while 3–11 are yellow. The elytron is yellow with a small black humeral macula and a black subovate sutural macula.

== Biology ==
Adults have been collected on ginger lily (Zingiberaceae), including Renealmia species (such as Renealmia pluriplicata), but also on Costus pulverulentus.
