= Costus curvibracteatus =

Conservation status
- Least Concern (IUCN 3.1)

Scientific classification
- Kingdom: Plantae
- Clade: Tracheophytes
- Clade: Angiosperms
- Clade: Monocots
- Clade: Commelinids
- Order: Zingiberales
- Family: Costaceae
- Genus: Costus
- Species: C. curvibracteatus

Binomial name
- Costus curvibracteatus Maas

Species of flowering plant

Costus curvibracteatus is a tropical rhizomatous perennial native to Costa Rica and Panama.

== Taxonomy ==
The first description of Costus curvibracteatus as a species was published by the Dutch botanist Paul Maas in 1976 in the Acta Botanica Neerlandica. The article, 'Notes on New World Zingiberaceae', described 12 new species in the genus Costus. The following year, Maas published a monograph on the Zingiberaceae, clearing up some taxonomic confusion and expanding descriptions, including that for C. curvibracteatus. In this and other early works, the genus Costus is placed in the family Zingiberaceae, subfamily Costoideae. Following further classification contributions by botanist W. John Kress, the spiral gingers were recognised as a sister clade to the Zingiberaceae and moved to the family Costaceae, as originally suggested by the Japanese botanist Takenoshin Nakai in 1941. (Note: As a member of the genus Costus, the plant, despite its common name, is neither a type of citrus fruit (genus Citrus), a tulip (genus Tulipa) or ginger spice (genus Zingiber).)

== Distribution and habitat ==
Costus curvibracteatus is native to Costa Rica and Panama, where it usually grows in the understory of forested montane areas between 700 and 1,900 metres (2,300 and 6,200 ft). The plant can sometimes be found growing as low as 50 m (160 ft). One record exists of the plant being found in the Chocó region of Colombia.

The plant is not uncommon in its native habitat and has been classified by the International Union for Conservation of Nature as being of least concern.

== Habit and description ==
An evergreen perennial, the large leaves of C. curvibracteatus can be effective ground cover, ranging in size from 15 to 35 centimetres (5.9 to 13.8 in) long and 5 to 10 cm (2.0 to 3.9 in) wide. They are glossy and glabrous above, but hirsute on the edges and underside, and alternately arranged on a spiralling stem, which has a diameter about 1.5 to 2.5 cm (0.59 to 0.98 in). Coriaceous (leather-like texture) and dark green, the leaves are obovate to elliptic, with a cuneate to rounded base, and the apex is usually acute to acuminate. One of the main features that distinguishes C. barbatus from C. curvibracteatus is the size of the ligule; that of the former is larger, by about 10 to 20 mm (0.39 to 0.79 in).

Glossy, overlapping bracts form a terminal inflorescence, that is spike-shaped to ovoid. The bracts are red to orange, usually becoming more orange at the apex, which curves outward. The inflorescence is quite variable in size, ranging from 4 to 18 centimetres (1.6 to 7.1 in) long and 3 to 9 centimetres (1.2 to 3.5 in) cm broad. During flowering, small, hermaphroditic yellow or orange tubular florets emerge among the bracts. They are usually about as long as the bracts but can be substantially longer. The bracts superficially resemble those of Renealmia cernua.

The height of the plant overall is typically between 1 and 1.5 metres (3 ft 3 in and 4 ft 11 in), though it occasionally can grow as tall as 3 metres (9.8 ft). Its rhizomes are about 20 millimetres (0.79 in) thick. Unlike its relative Zingiber officinale, the rhizomes are not edible, and it is not used as a spice.

== Reproduction and cultivation ==
Costus curvibracteatus produces abundant nectar in its tubular florets and is pollinated by hummingbirds. Its seeds, by which it reproduces, are contained within glabrous, ellipsoid capsules, 10 to 17 mm long.

Only occasionally cultivated as an ornamental, it can nevertheless be grown successfully in milder climates if kept warm and sheltered in a shady location, with well-watered soil. It also grows well when potted and indoors. The plant can be grown from seeds, by first soaking them, or from cuttings of a mature plant.

Costus productus is more common in the ornamental plant trade, but is often incorrectly labelled as C. curvibracteatus.
