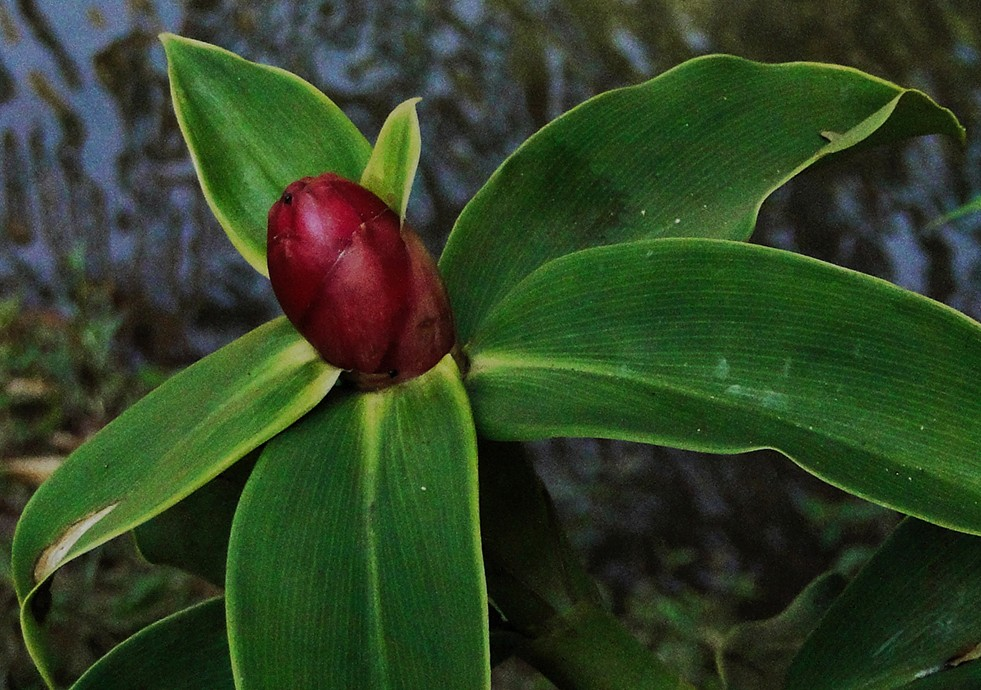
- Cultivated in São Paulo, Brazil
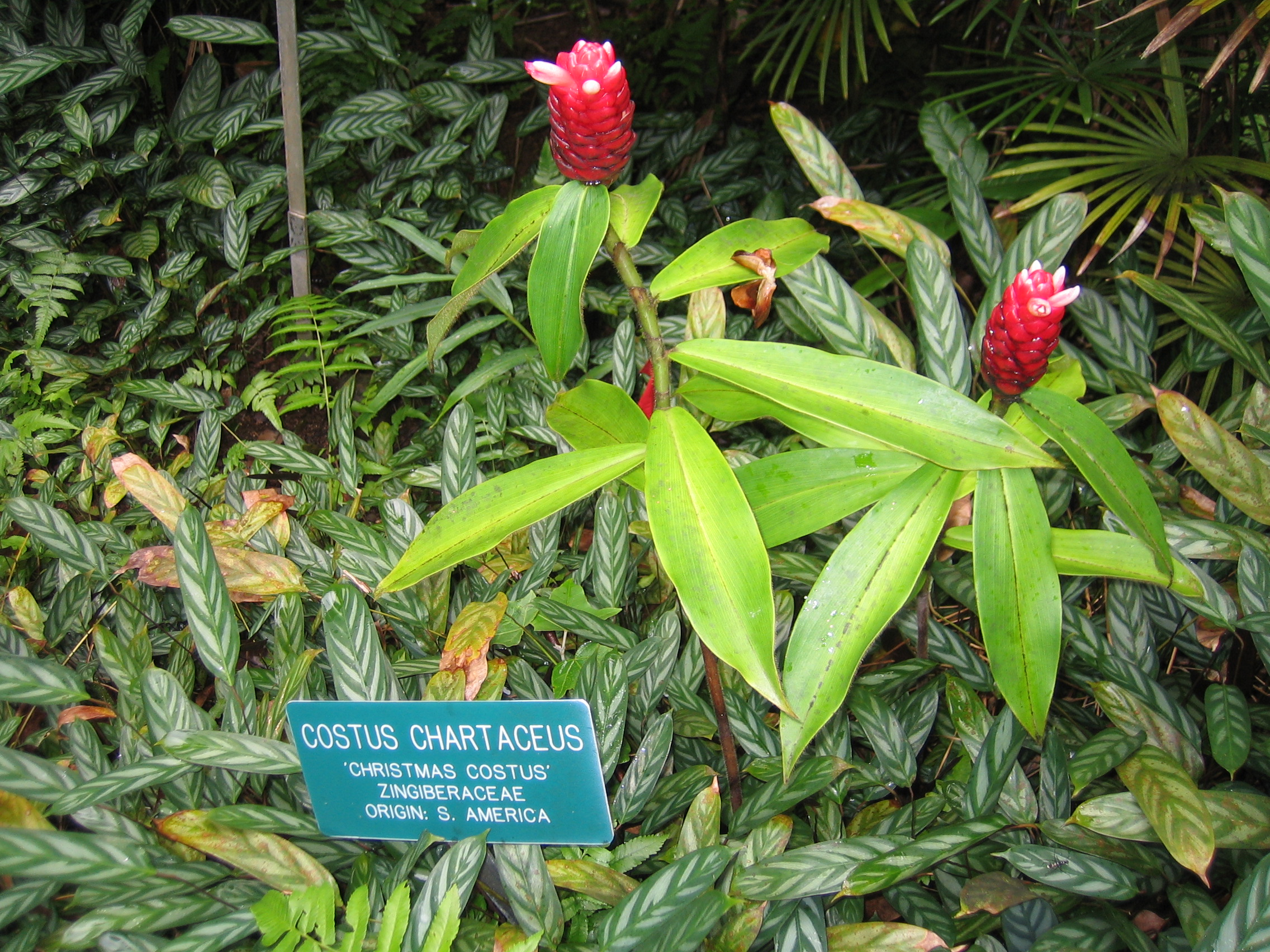
- At Hawaii Botanical Garden

Scientific classification
- Kingdom: Plantae
- Clade: Embryophytes
- Clade: Tracheophytes
- Clade: Spermatophytes
- Clade: Angiosperms
- Clade: Monocots
- Clade: Commelinids
- Order: Zingiberales
- Family: Costaceae
- Genus: Costus
- Species: C. chartaceus

Binomial name
- Costus chartaceus Maas

= Costus chartaceus =

Christmas costus

Species of flowering plant

Costus chartaceus, commonly known as the Christmas costus, is a perennial plant with a red inflorescence first described by Paul Maas in 1972. It is native to Colombia and Ecuador but cultivated as an ornamental in other regions. It is not winter hardy.

Costus chartaceus is similar in appearance to Costus prancei and Costus sprucei. Costus chartaceus is known locally as Caña agria in Spanish, Allpala-shangu in Quichua, Tentemokagi in Huaorani, Úntuntup in Achuar and Jivaro, and Virucaspi in an unidentified language.
