= Costus zamoranus =

Conservation status
- Endangered (IUCN 3.1)

Scientific classification
- Kingdom: Plantae
- Clade: Tracheophytes
- Clade: Angiosperms
- Clade: Monocots
- Clade: Commelinids
- Order: Zingiberales
- Family: Costaceae
- Genus: Costus
- Species: C. zamoranus

Binomial name
- Costus zamoranus Steyerm.

Species of flowering plant

Costus zamoranus is an endangered species of plant native to Bolivia, Colombia, and Ecuador. As of 2015 there were estimated to be 200 plants still growing wild in Ecuador, though the remaining forest habitat is threatened by farming, livestock and logging.

Costus zamoranus was first described by Julian Alfred Steyermark in 1964.

In Ecuador, Costus zamoranus is used medicinally along with other plants.
