= Costus longibracteolatus =

Scientific classification
- Kingdom: Plantae
- Clade: Tracheophytes
- Clade: Angiosperms
- Clade: Monocots
- Clade: Commelinids
- Order: Zingiberales
- Family: Costaceae
- Genus: Costus
- Species: C. longibracteolatus

Binomial name
- Costus longibracteolatus Maas

Species of flowering plant

Costus longibracteolatus is a species of flowering plant in the genus Costus. Its native range is western South America to Guyana, where it grows in forests at lower elevations. Costus longibracteolatus is known locally as Caña and Caña agria in Spanish, Sacha chiguilla in Kichwa, and Kiwácyo in Bora. It was first described by Paul Maas in 1972.

Costus longibracteolatus has the common cultivars Costus 'Kiss of Death' and Costus 'Long Kiss'.
