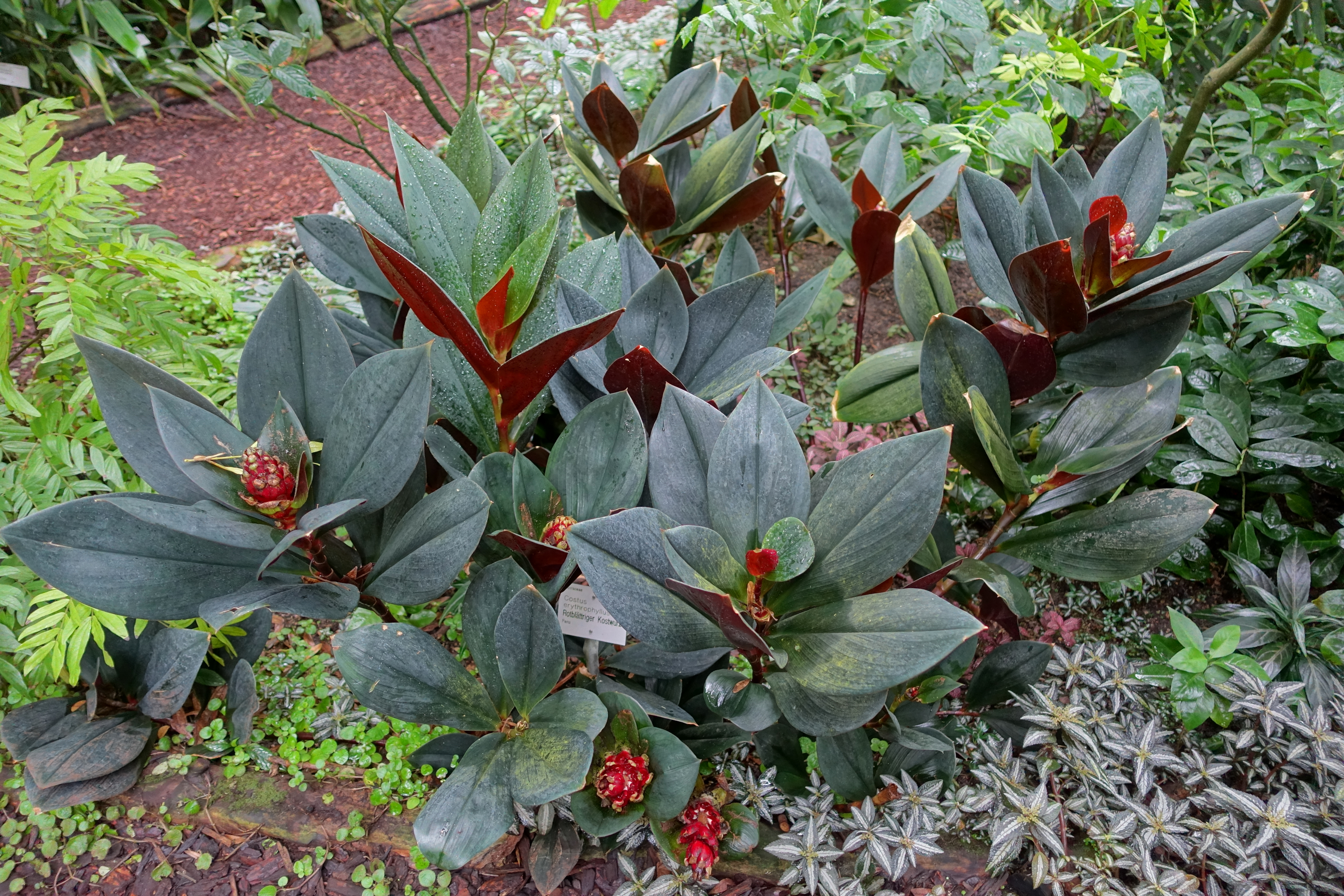

Scientific classification
- Kingdom: Plantae
- Clade: Tracheophytes
- Clade: Angiosperms
- Clade: Monocots
- Clade: Commelinids
- Order: Zingiberales
- Family: Costaceae
- Genus: Costus
- Species: C. erythrophyllus

Binomial name
- Costus erythrophyllus Loes.

= Costus erythrophyllus =

Species of flowering plant

Costus erythrophyllus is species of flowering plant in the family Costaceae. It is a tropical rhizomatous perennial plant native to Colombia, Ecuador, Peru, and northern Brazil. It was first described in 1929. The most common form in cultivation grows to about 1 meter in height, with waxy leaves that are dark green on top, and deep purple underneath. In Huambisa, Costus erythrophyllus is known as untuntu.
