= Costus vinosus =

Conservation status
- Critically endangered, possibly extinct in the wild (IUCN 3.1)

Scientific classification
- Kingdom: Plantae
- Clade: Tracheophytes
- Clade: Angiosperms
- Clade: Monocots
- Clade: Commelinids
- Order: Zingiberales
- Family: Costaceae
- Genus: Costus
- Species: C. vinosus

Binomial name
- Costus vinosus Maas

Species of flowering plant

Costus vinosus is a critically endangered species of plant in the family Costaceae which may now be extinct in the wild. It is endemic to Panama. Costus vinosus was first described by Paul Maas in 1976. As of 2015 Costus vinosus could still be found in the wild.
