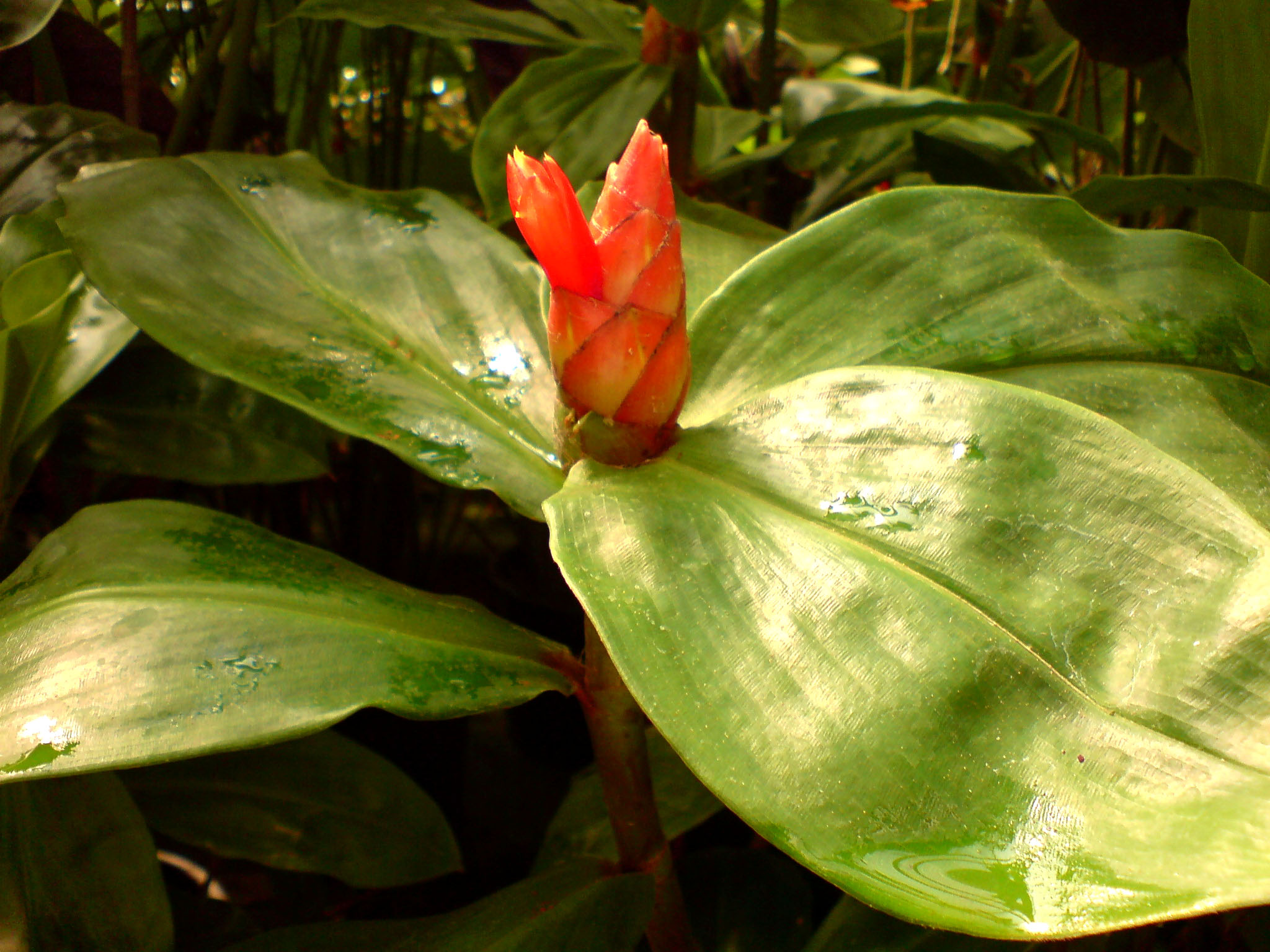

Scientific classification
- Kingdom: Plantae
- Clade: Tracheophytes
- Clade: Angiosperms
- Clade: Monocots
- Clade: Commelinids
- Order: Zingiberales
- Family: Costaceae
- Genus: Costus
- Species: C. scaber

Binomial name
- Costus scaber Ruiz & Pav.

Synonyms
- Costus anachiri Jacq.; Costus ciliatus Miq.; Costus cylindricus var. anachiri (Jacq.) Petersen; Costus cylindricus var. ciliatus (Miq.) Petersen; Costus nutans K.Schum.; Costus puchucupango J.F.Macbr.; Costus quintus Roem. & Schult.; Costus scaberulus Rich. ex Gagnep.; Costus tatei Rusby

= Costus scaber =

Species of plant

Costus scaber is a species of plant in the family Costaceae. Its native range is Mexico to Tropical America.

In Costa Rica, Costus scaber is grown in homegardens and used to treat multiple medical conditions. In Trinidad, it is used as an ingredient in treating dogs for snakebite.

Costus scaber has been introduced to Hawaii, the Leeward Islands, and Puerto Rico. It has been identified as native or alien to Saint Lucia.

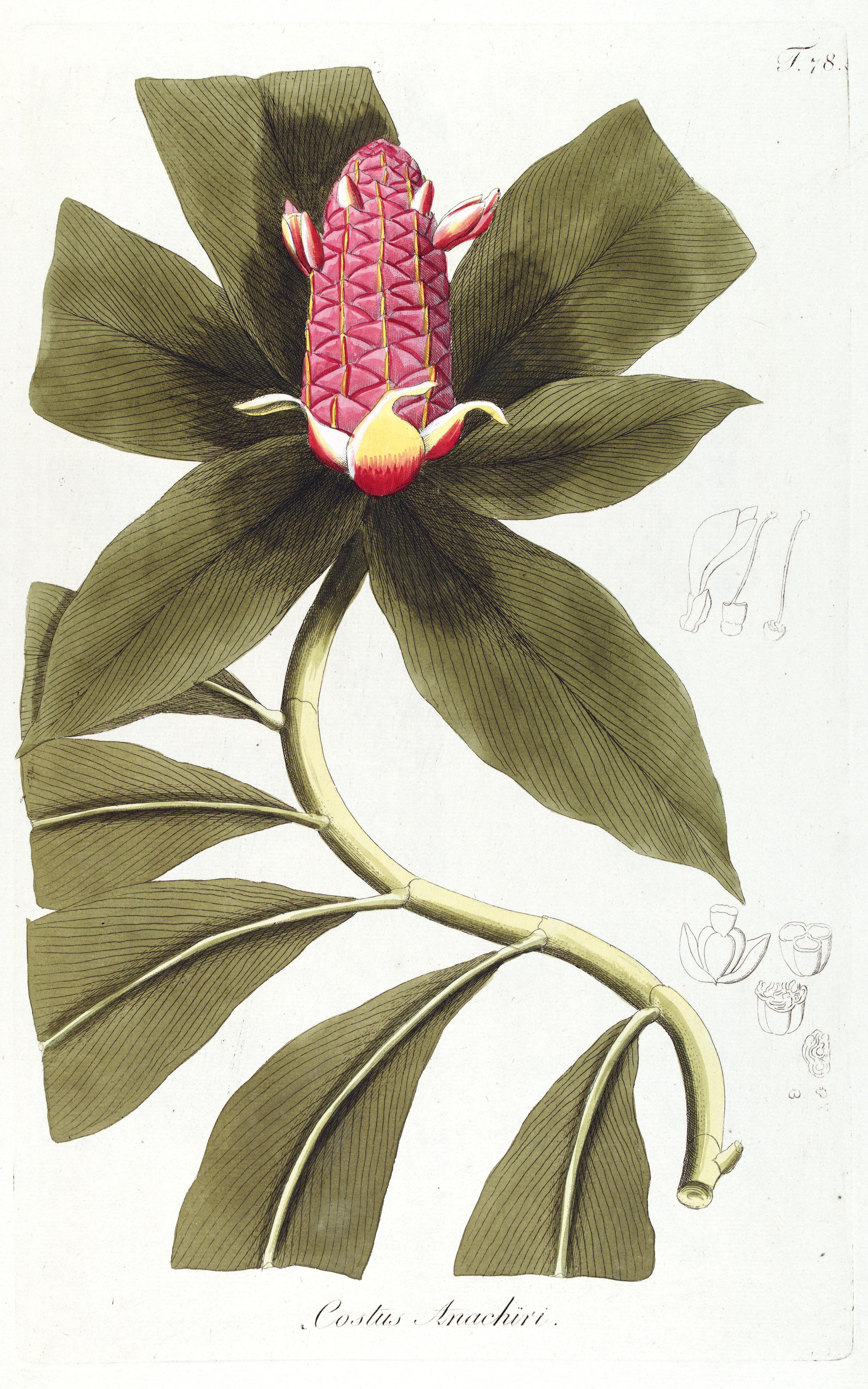
Detail of plant.

Costus scaber is very similar in appearance to other species of Costus, especially Costus spicatus and Costus spiralis.
