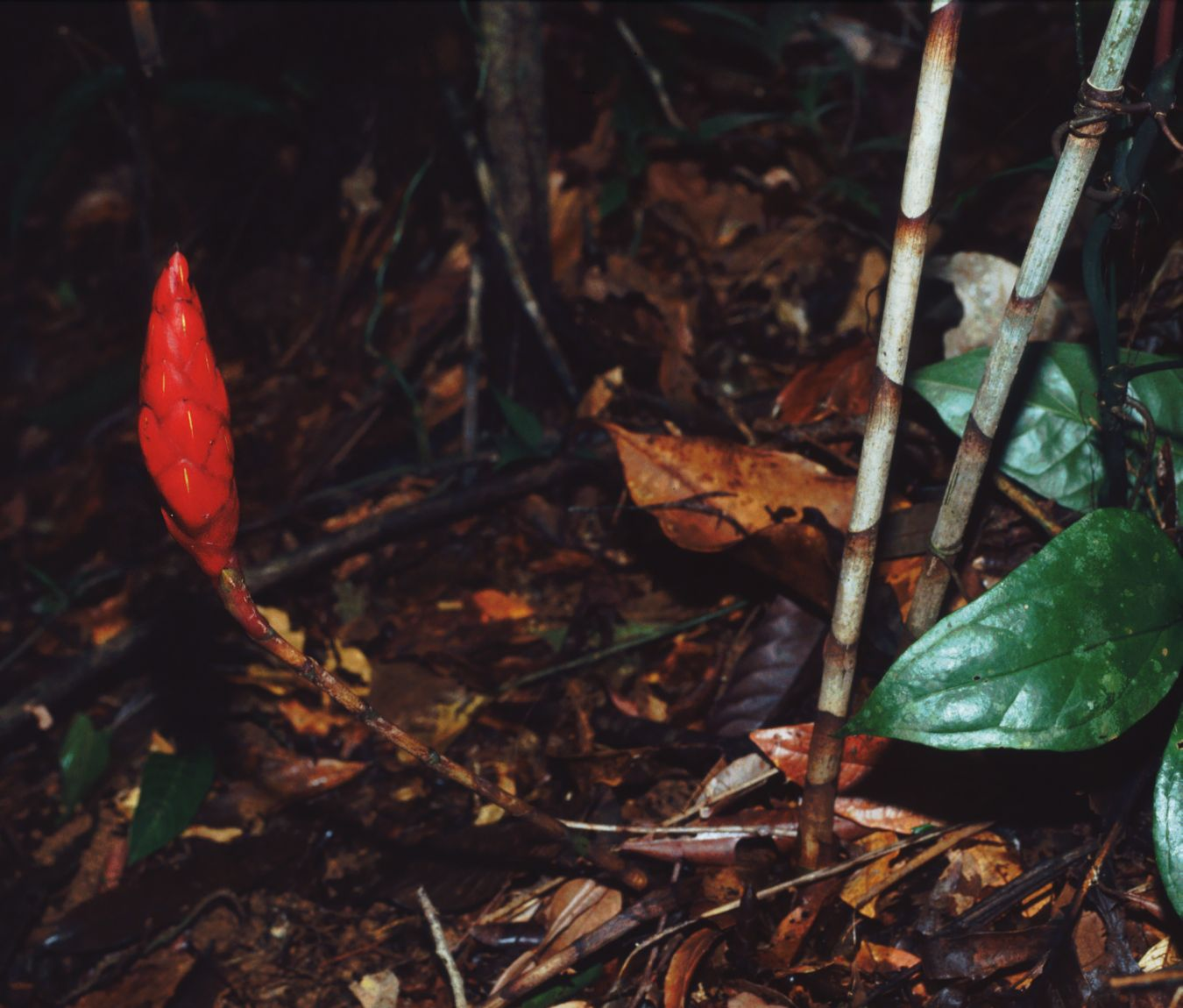

Conservation status
- Least Concern (IUCN 3.1)

Scientific classification
- Kingdom: Plantae
- Clade: Tracheophytes
- Clade: Angiosperms
- Clade: Monocots
- Clade: Commelinids
- Order: Zingiberales
- Family: Costaceae
- Genus: Costus
- Species: C. stenophyllus

Binomial name
- Costus stenophyllus Standl. & L.O.Williams

= Costus stenophyllus =

Species of flowering plant

Costus stenophyllus, the bamboo costus, is a species of plant endemic to Costa Rica. In southern Costa Rica, it grows in forests, most typically on ridges and steep slopes. It is also grown as an ornamental outside of its native range.

Costus stenophyllus is not easily confused with other Central American species of Costus, in part due to its narrow leaves.
