= Costus louisii =

Conservation status
- Critically Endangered (IUCN 3.1)

Scientific classification
- Kingdom: Plantae
- Clade: Embryophytes
- Clade: Tracheophytes
- Clade: Spermatophytes
- Clade: Angiosperms
- Clade: Monocots
- Clade: Commelinids
- Order: Zingiberales
- Family: Costaceae
- Genus: Costus
- Species: C. louisii

Binomial name
- Costus louisii H.Maas & Maas

Species of flowering plant

Costus louisii is a critically endangered species of plant endemic to Gabon.

Costus louisii was first described by Hiltje Maas-van de Kamer and Paul Maas in 2016. A.M. Louis collected the first and only specimen of Costus louisii obtained from the wild. Costus louisii has only been found in a small area, and its habitat appears threatened by human actions.

Costus louisii resembles Costus afer in appearance.
