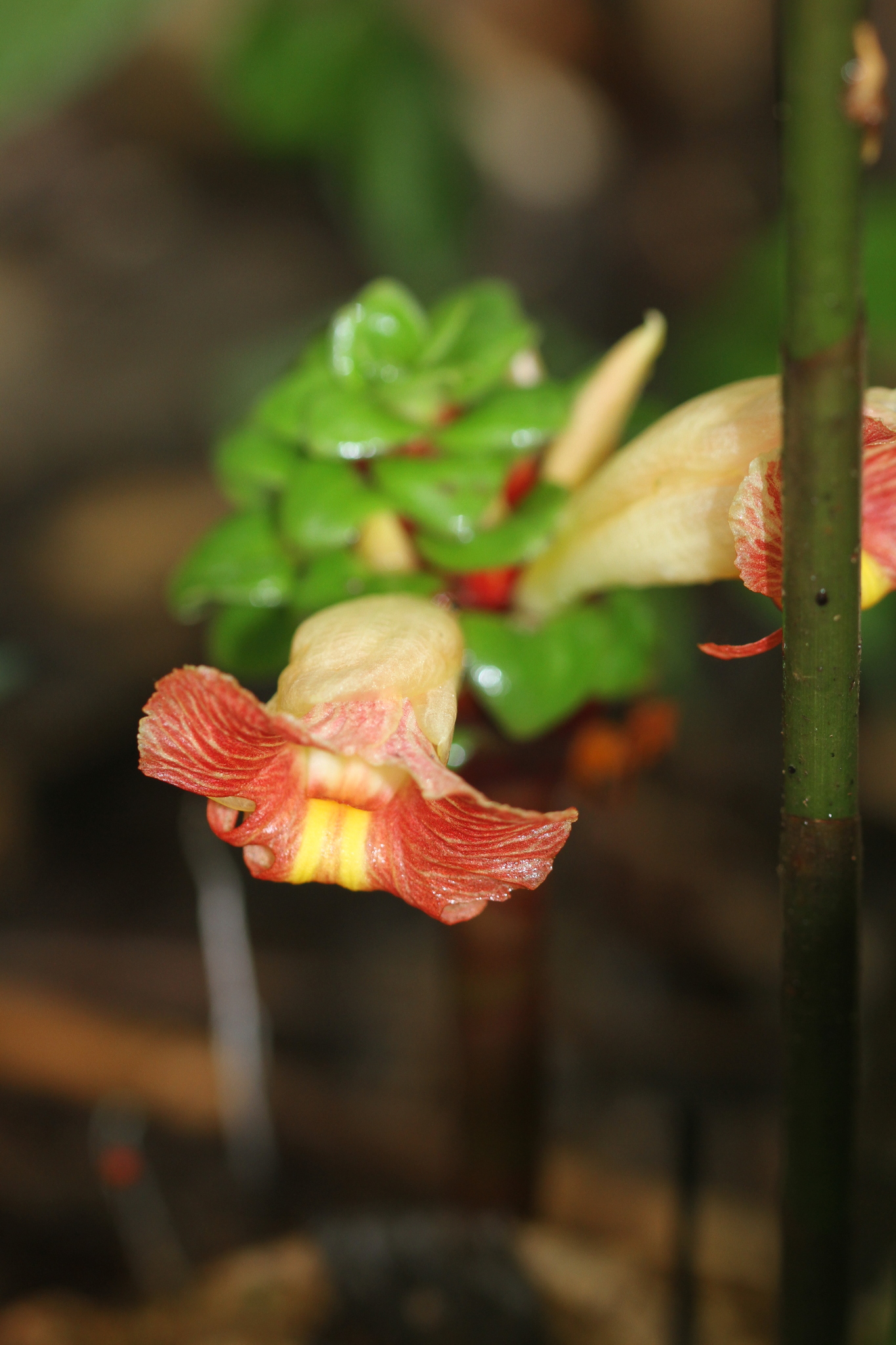

Scientific classification
- Kingdom: Plantae
- Clade: Tracheophytes
- Clade: Angiosperms
- Clade: Monocots
- Clade: Commelinids
- Order: Zingiberales
- Family: Costaceae
- Genus: Costus
- Species: C. claviger

Binomial name
- Costus claviger Benoist

Synonyms
- Costus bracteatus Gleason; Costus guianicus Loes.

= Costus claviger =

Species of flowering plant

Costus claviger is a species of flowering plant from the genus Costus.

== Description ==
Costus claviger is a rhizomatous geophyte and grows primarily in the wet tropical biome. It flowers in the rainy season.

== Distribution ==
Costus claviger is native to: French Guiana, Guyana and Suriname. It preferes to grow on a granitic substrate, i.e. in soil that contains granite.
