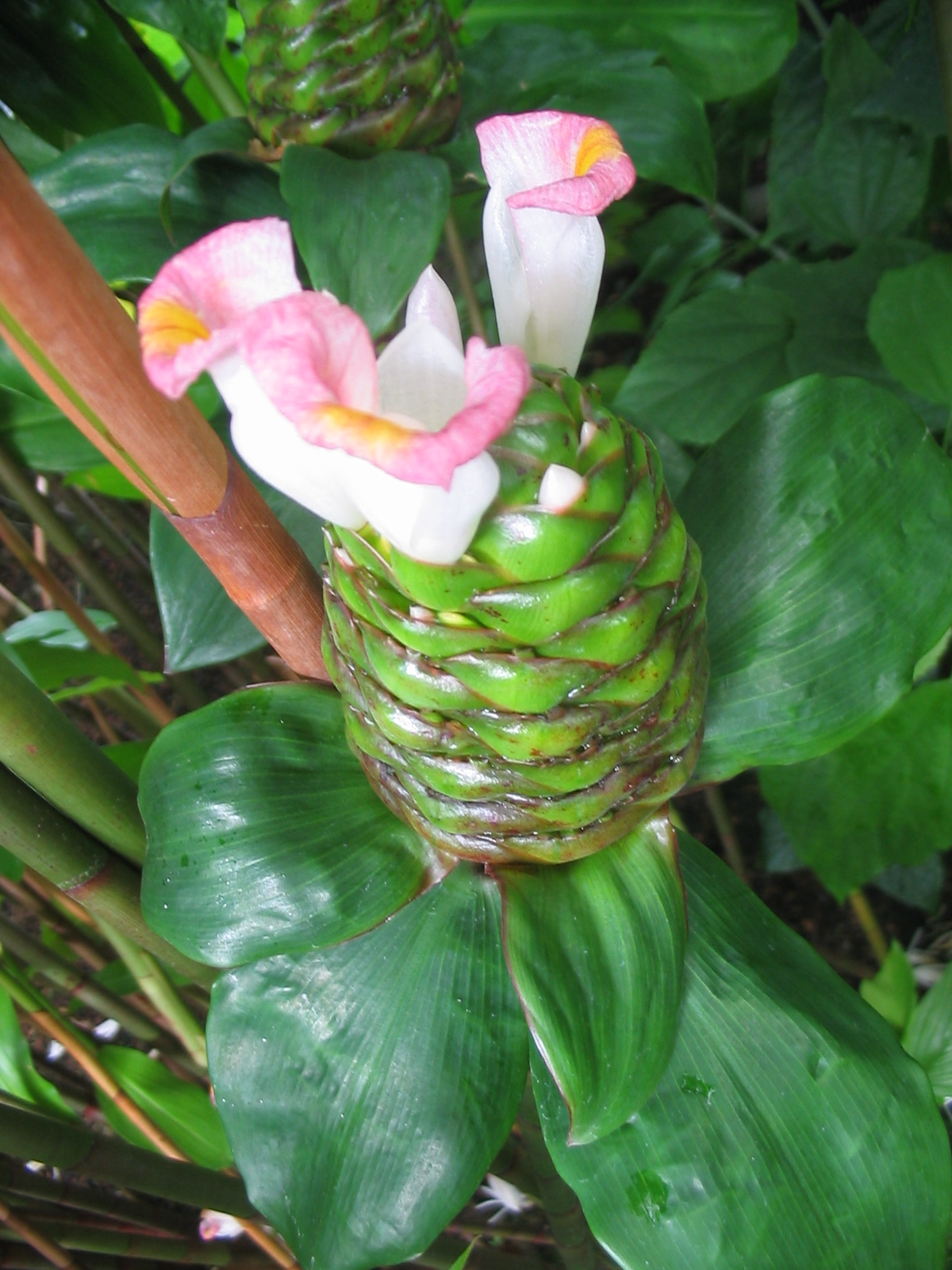

Scientific classification
- Kingdom: Plantae
- Clade: Embryophytes
- Clade: Tracheophytes
- Clade: Angiosperms
- Clade: Monocots
- Clade: Commelinids
- Order: Zingiberales
- Family: Costaceae
- Genus: Costus
- Species: C. afer

Binomial name
- Costus afer Ker Gawl.

= Costus afer =

Species of plant

Costus afer, English ginger lily or common ginger lily, is a species of plant native to Tropical Africa.

Costus afer is widely cultivated. It has many traditional uses, including but not limited to treating a range of medical ailments. Costus afer is high in diosgenin.

Costus afer has a wide native distribution spanning North East Africa, West Africa, Central Africa, East Africa, and Southern Tropical Africa.

Costus afer is sometimes confused with other African species of Costus, such as Costus dubius and Costus lucanusianus. It is also similar looking to Costus louisii.
