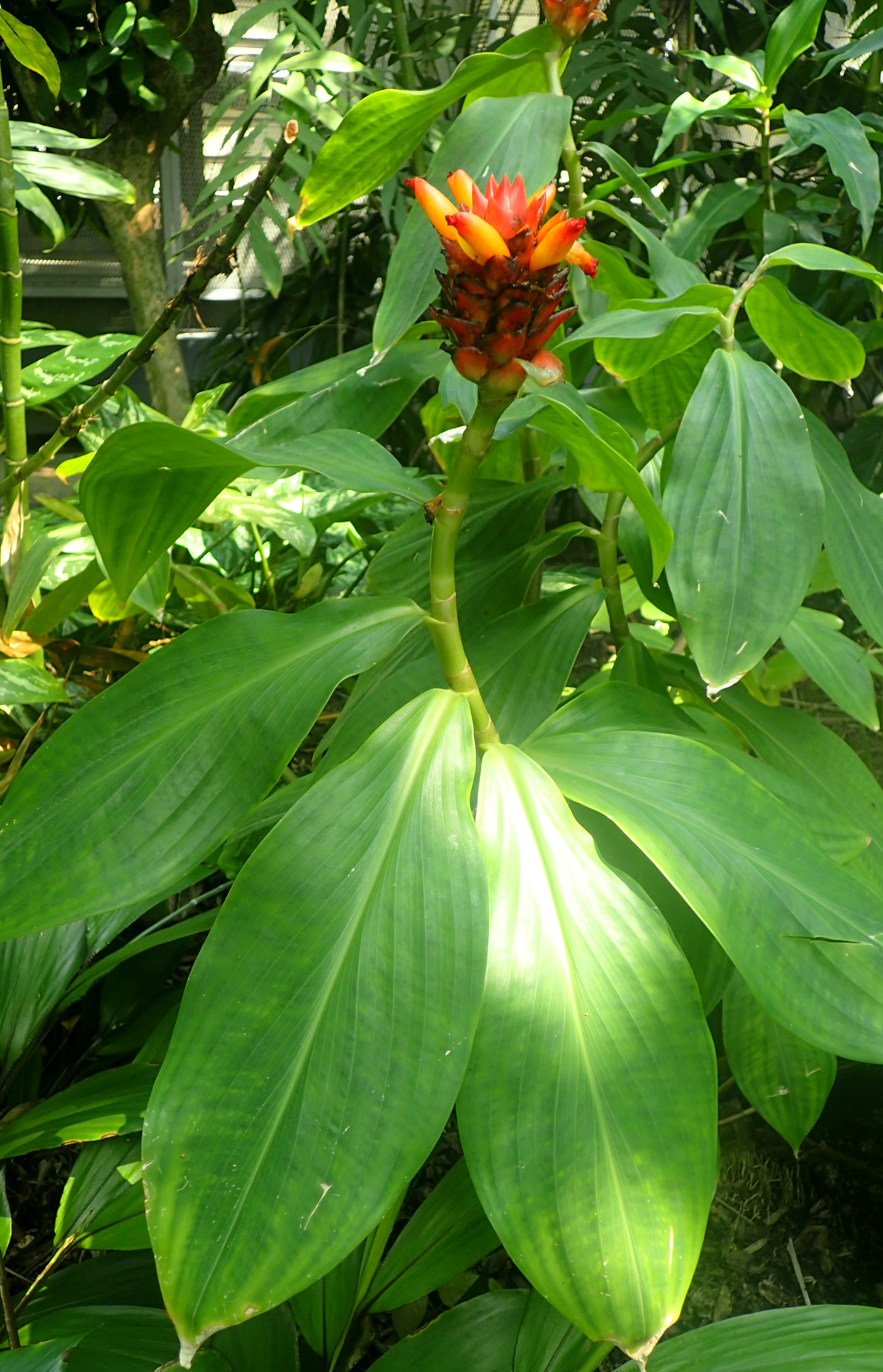

Scientific classification
- Kingdom: Plantae
- Clade: Tracheophytes
- Clade: Angiosperms
- Clade: Monocots
- Clade: Commelinids
- Order: Zingiberales
- Family: Costaceae
- Genus: Costus
- Species: C. productus

Binomial name
- Costus productus Gleason ex Maas

= Costus productus =

Species of plant

Costus productus, known as orange tulip ginger, dwarf orange ginger, or green mountain spiral flag, is a species of plant in the Costaceae family. Costus productus is native to South Colombia and Peru.

Costus productus var. strigosis is a hairy variety from southern Colombia, while Costus productus var. productus is a smooth variety from Peru. The cultivated forms of Costus productus are all C. productus var. productus, and there are several different cultivars.

The flowers of Costus productus are edible. The Yanesha people use Costus productus along with Bactris gasipaes and Bromelia species to treat symptoms of epilepsy.

Costus productus has been often incorrectly identified as Costus curvibracteatus.
