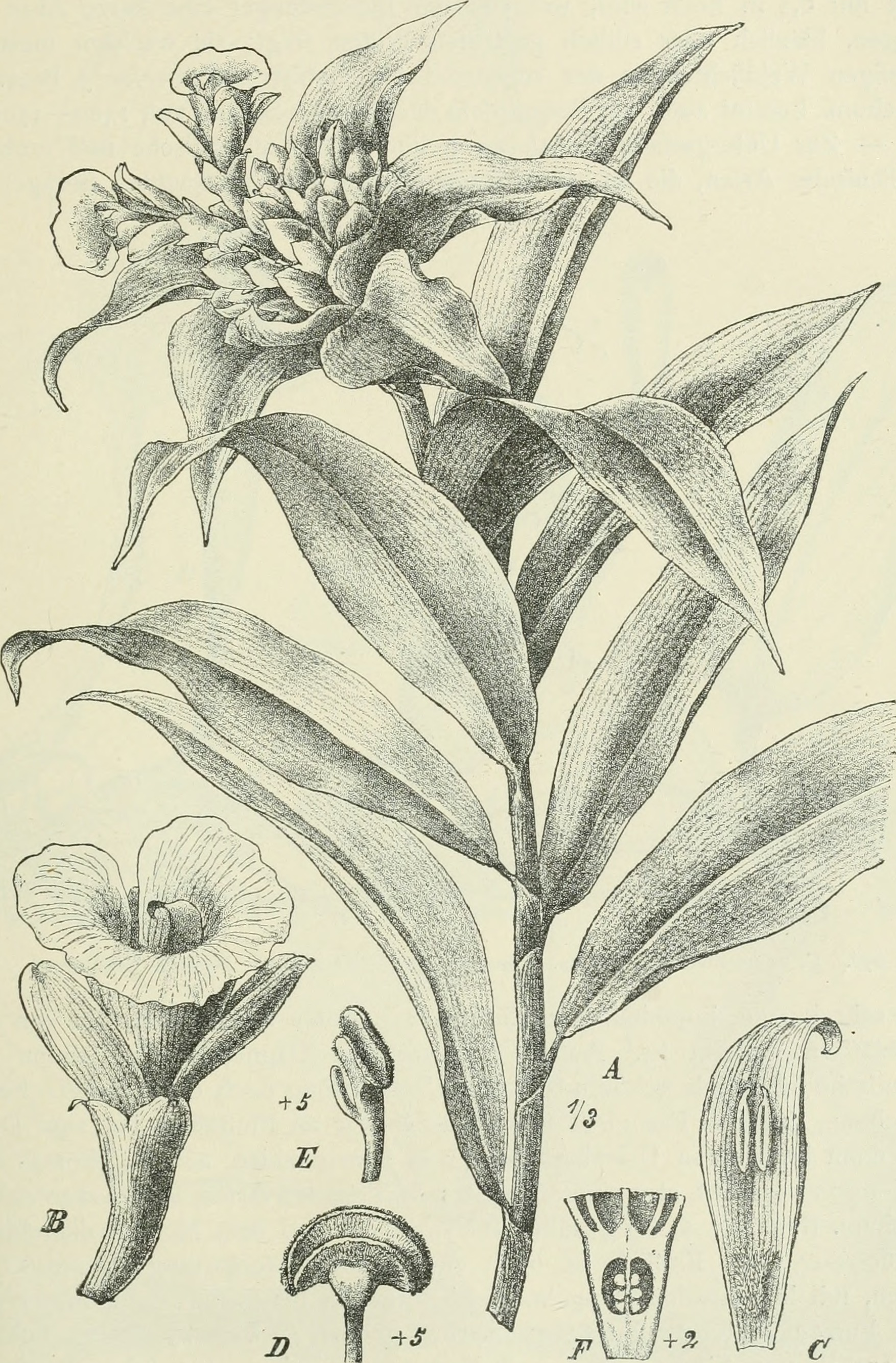

Scientific classification
- Kingdom: Plantae
- Clade: Embryophytes
- Clade: Tracheophytes
- Clade: Spermatophytes
- Clade: Angiosperms
- Clade: Monocots
- Clade: Commelinids
- Order: Zingiberales
- Family: Costaceae
- Genus: Costus
- Species: C. lucanusianus

Binomial name
- Costus lucanusianus J.Braun & K.Schum.

= Costus lucanusianus =

Species of plant

Costus lucanusianus is a species of plant native to Africa. It is widely distributed across North East Africa, West Africa, Central Africa, East Africa, and Southern Tropical Africa.

Costus lucanusianus is commonly cultivated.

Costus lucanusianus has many different traditional medicinal uses. Rhizomes of Costus lucanusianus are higher in percent diosgenin than those of Cheilocostus speciosus.

Costus lucanusianus is sometimes confused with Costus afer. Costus lucanusianus and Costus aureus are very similar vegetatively, though they differ in flower color.
