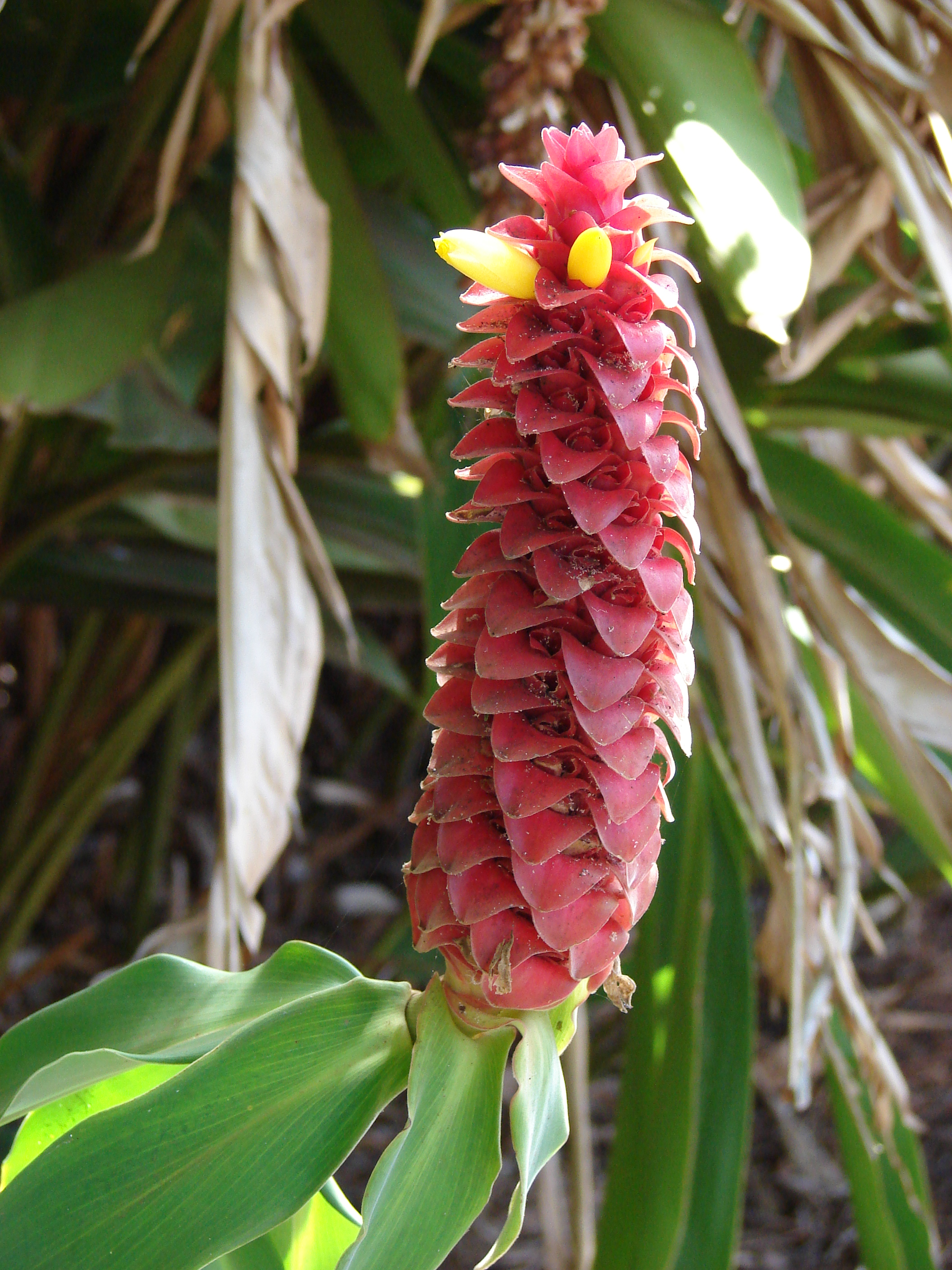

Scientific classification
- Kingdom: Plantae
- Clade: Tracheophytes
- Clade: Angiosperms
- Clade: Monocots
- Clade: Commelinids
- Order: Zingiberales
- Family: Costaceae
- Genus: Costus
- Species: C. comosus

Binomial name
- Costus comosus (Jacq.) Roscoe

= Costus comosus =

Species of plant

Costus comosus, known as red tower ginger, is a species of plant native to South Mexico to Ecuador.

As a cultivated plant,Costus comosus is cold hardy; however, if it freezes back to the ground over the winter it is unlikely to flower.

Costus comosus contains chemical compounds which have been found to have anti-diabetic activity. In traditional medicine, Costus comosus is used to treat several conditions including asthma, bronchitis, intestinal worms, diabetes, and liver diseases. It is also used traditionally for rash and fever. People of Southern Ecuador use Costus comosus to treat headache, liver pain, diabetes, influenza, and kidney ailments. They also use it as a diuretic.

The name Costus barbatus has often been mistakenly applied to Costus comosus.
