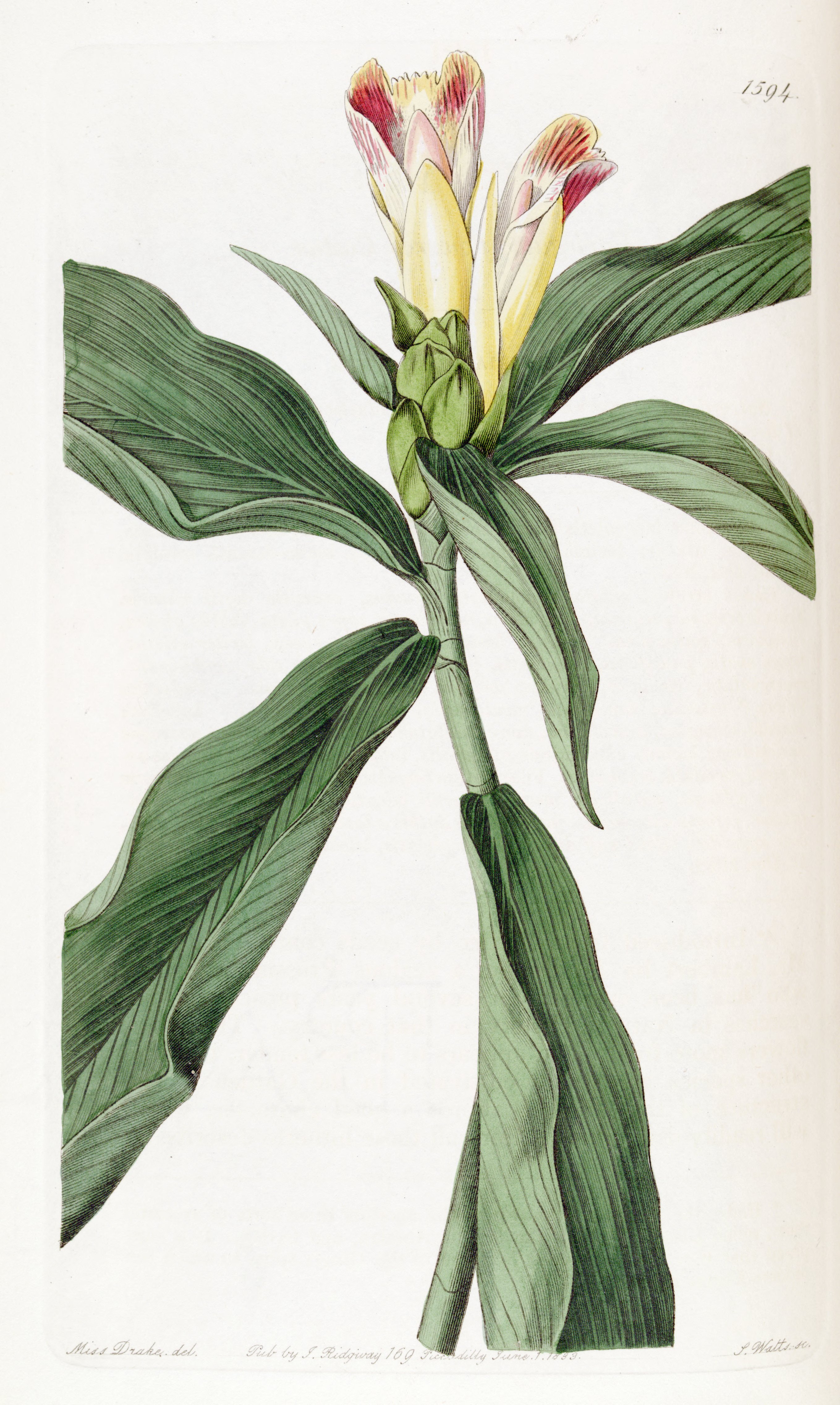

Scientific classification
- Kingdom: Plantae
- Clade: Tracheophytes
- Clade: Angiosperms
- Clade: Monocots
- Clade: Commelinids
- Order: Zingiberales
- Family: Costaceae
- Genus: Costus
- Species: C. pictus

Binomial name
- Costus pictus D.Don

Synonyms
- Costus congestus Rowlee; Costus mexicanus Liebm.; Pyxa picta (D.Don) S.R.Dutta & S.Yadav

= Costus pictus =

Species of plant

Costus pictus, known as painted spiral ginger or spotted spiral ginger, is a species of plant in the Costaceae family. Its native range is Mexico to Central America.

Costus pictus is winter-hardy in north Florida.
