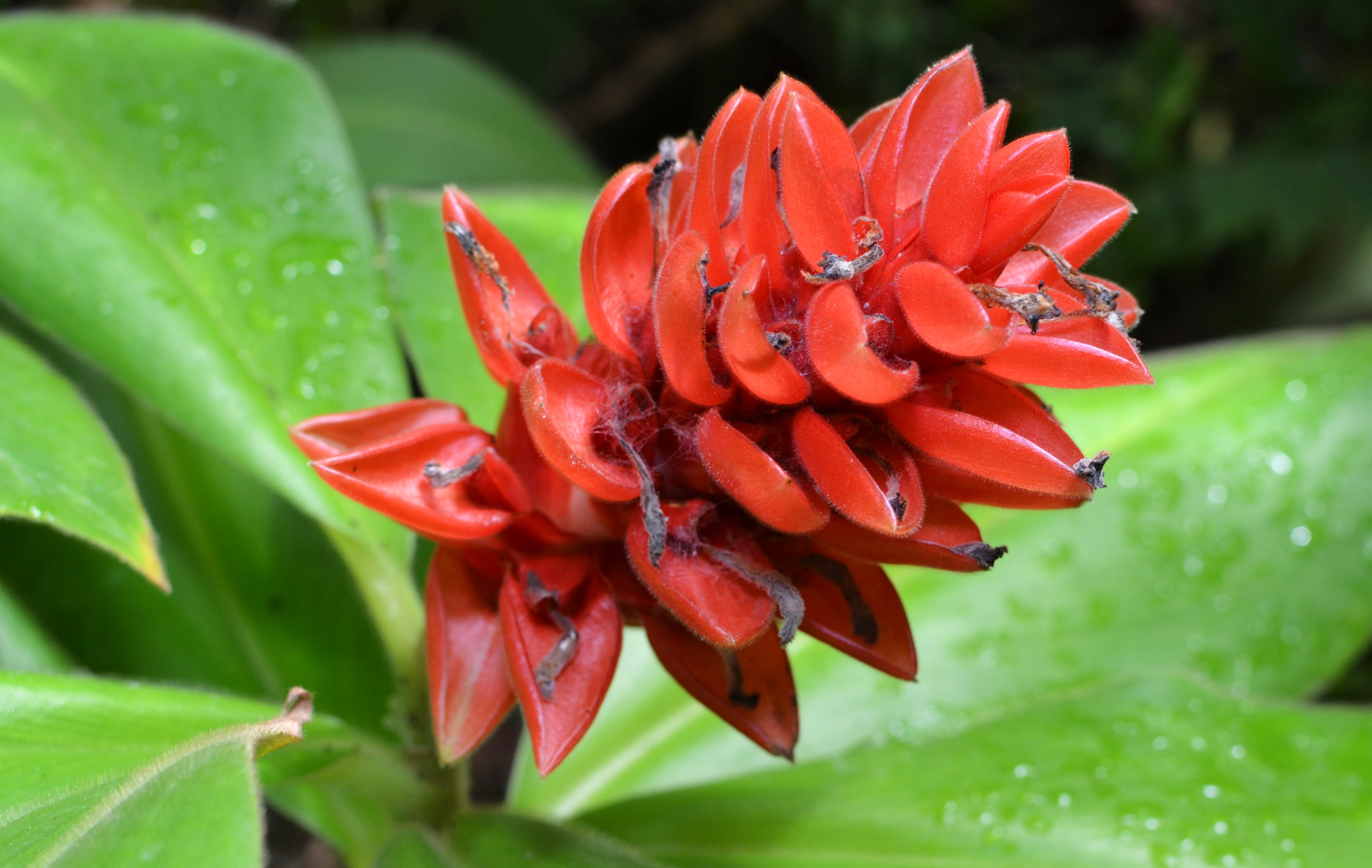

Scientific classification
- Kingdom: Plantae
- Clade: Tracheophytes
- Clade: Angiosperms
- Clade: Monocots
- Clade: Commelinids
- Order: Zingiberales
- Family: Costaceae
- Genus: Costus
- Species: C. osae

Binomial name
- Costus osae Maas & H.Maas

= Costus osae =

Species of flowering plant

Costus osae is a species of flowering plant in the family Costaceae. One of many rare tropical plants in the Costus family, Costus osae is a species native to Costa Rica described in 1997 by Paul Maas and Hiltje Maas-van de Kamer. It has also been reported from Colombia.

This plant has thick stems with large green fuzzy leaves. It grows to an average height of about four feet and produces thick clusters of bright red bracts. It is rare as a garden plant or houseplant in the United States and it is speculated to be hardy in zones 9–10.

Costus osae is named for the Osa Peninsula of Costa Rica, where it is found. In the wild, it is pollinated by hummingbirds.
