= Costus nitidus =

Conservation status
- Endangered (IUCN 3.1)

Scientific classification
- Kingdom: Plantae
- Clade: Tracheophytes
- Clade: Angiosperms
- Clade: Monocots
- Clade: Commelinids
- Order: Zingiberales
- Family: Costaceae
- Genus: Costus
- Species: C. nitidus

Binomial name
- Costus nitidus Maas

Species of flowering plant

Costus nitidus is an endangered species of plant in the family Costaceae. Its native range is Costa Rica to Panama. Costus nitidus was first described by Paul Maas in 1976. The name "nitidus" means "with a polished surface, neat, shining."

Costus nitidus is similar to Costus plicatus.
