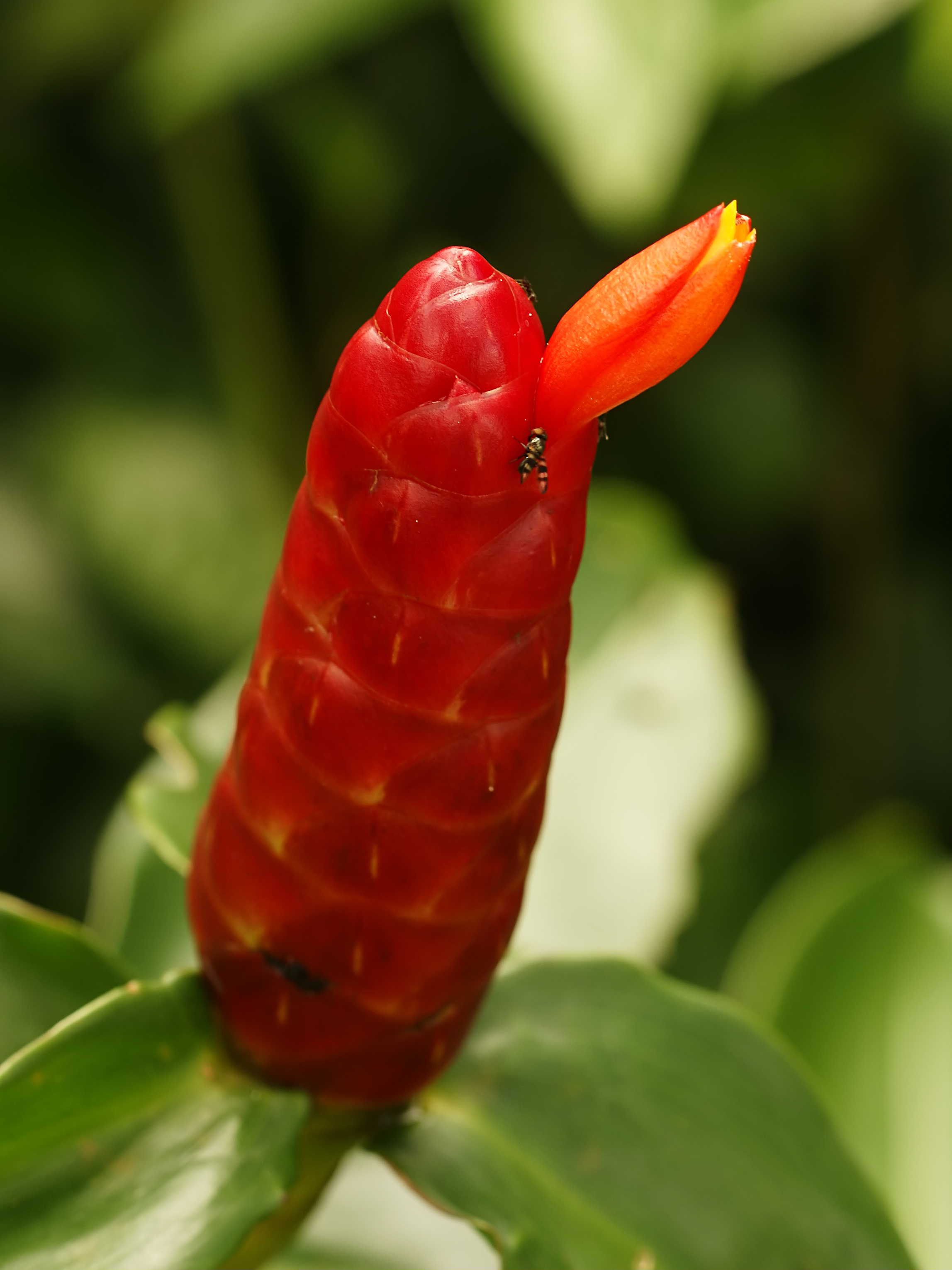
- Inflorescence
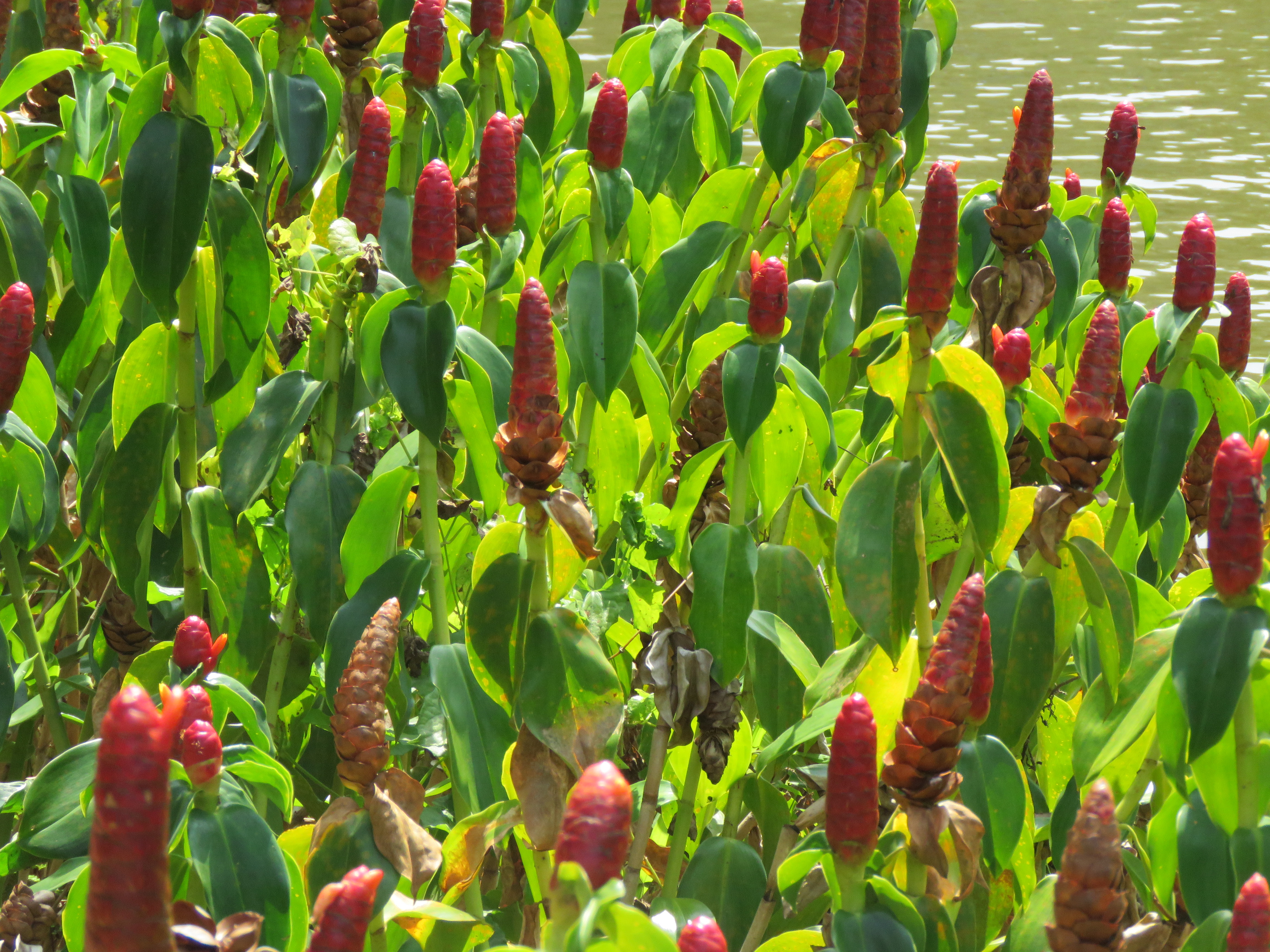
- Mass effect

Conservation status
- Least Concern (IUCN 3.1)

Scientific classification
- Kingdom: Plantae
- Clade: Tracheophytes
- Clade: Angiosperms
- Clade: Monocots
- Clade: Commelinids
- Order: Zingiberales
- Family: Costaceae
- Genus: Costus
- Species: C. woodsonii

Binomial name
- Costus woodsonii Maas

= Costus woodsonii =

Species of plant

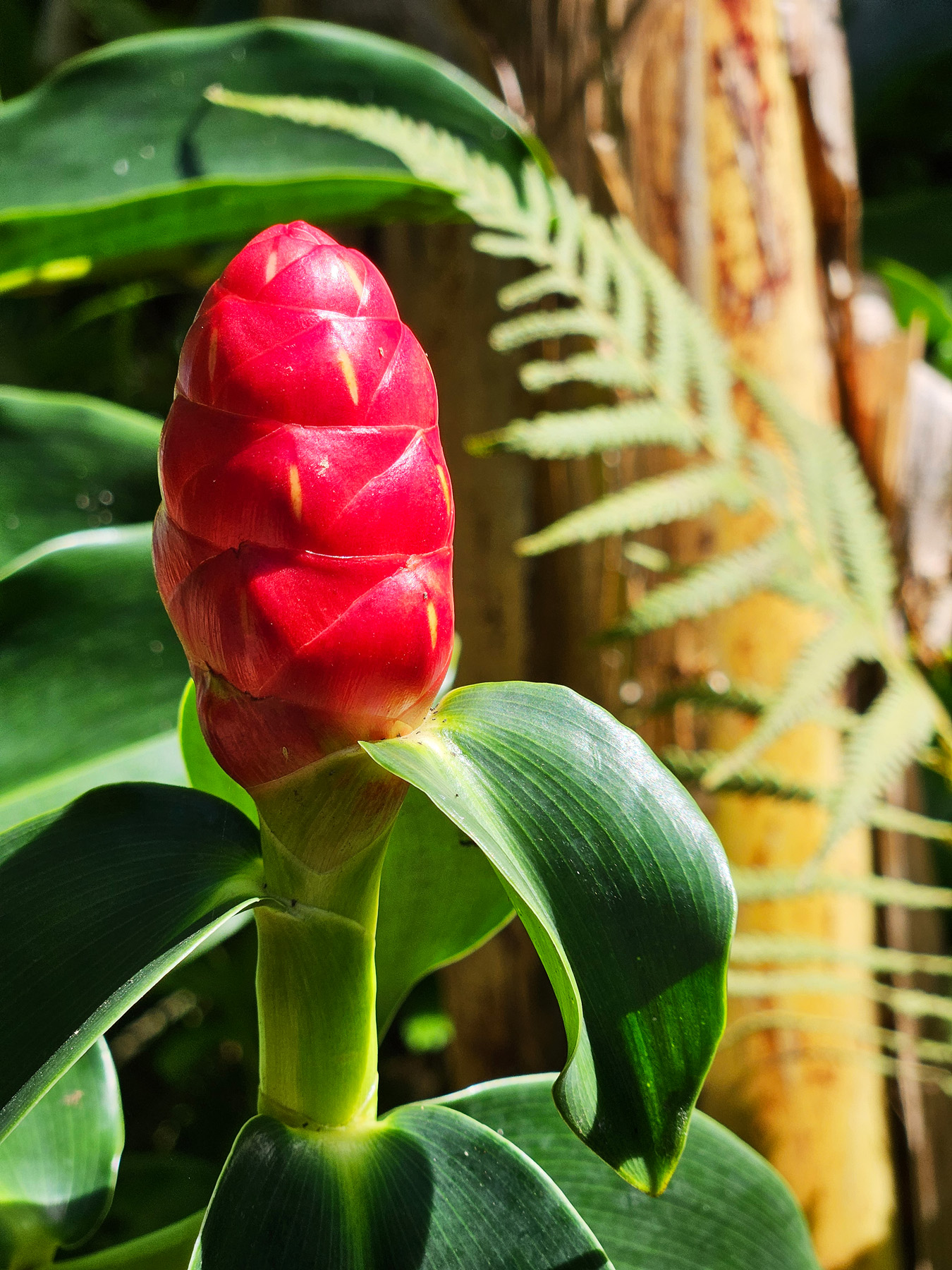
Costus woodsonii Maas., Maui

Costus woodsonii, the red button ginger or scarlet spiral flag, is a species of flowering plant in the family Costaceae, native to Nicaragua, Costa Rica, Panama, and Colombia. A rhizomatous geophytic perennial, it is recommended for coastal gardens, borders, containers, and general wet, tropical garden applications. It is more widely cultivated than other species of Costus. Costus woodsonii was first described by Paul Maas in 1972 and is named for Robert Woodson of the Missouri Botanical Garden.

Costus woodsonii flowers all year round. Unlike other Costaceae, Costus woodsonii can grow in sandy, coastal areas.

== Ecology ==
The inflorescence of C. woodsonii has bracts that produce extrafloral nectar. This nectar attracts ants that interfere with oviposition by herbivores of the plant. White-faced capuchins (Cebus capucinus) eat Costus woodsonii.
