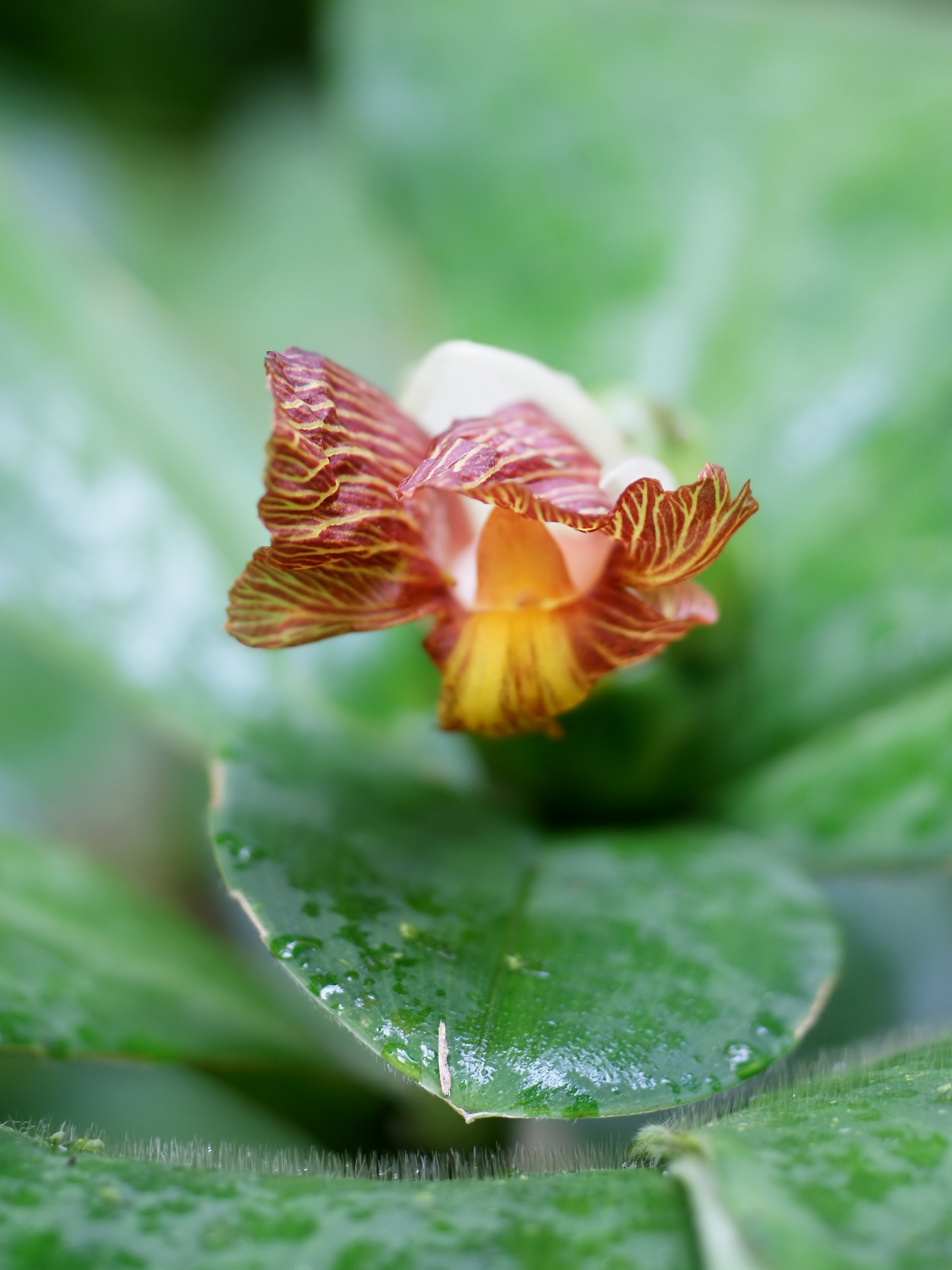
- At Puentes Colgantes near Arenal, Costa Rica

Scientific classification
- Kingdom: Plantae
- Clade: Tracheophytes
- Clade: Angiosperms
- Clade: Monocots
- Clade: Commelinids
- Order: Zingiberales
- Family: Costaceae
- Genus: Costus
- Species: C. elegans

Binomial name
- Costus elegans Petersen

Synonyms
- Costus malortieanus H.Wendl.

= Costus elegans =

Species of flowering plant

Costus elegans, known as stepladder plant, spiral ginger, or spiral flag, is a species of perennial herbaceous flowering plant in the family Costaceae. It is native to Costa Rica, Nicaragua, and Honduras. Costus elegans is often cultivated as an ornamental plant.

== Description ==
Costus elegans has large felty leaves and grows up to 1 meter tall. The ligule is short. Flowers are formed at the terminal ends of stalks. The corollas are creamy white to yellow and have red-striped labellum wings.

== Distribution and habitat ==
It is native to Costa Rica, Nicaragua, and Honduras. Costus elegans has been introduced in the Dominican Republic, Puerto Rico, and on the island of Maui, Hawaii, U.S.A.

== Gallery ==
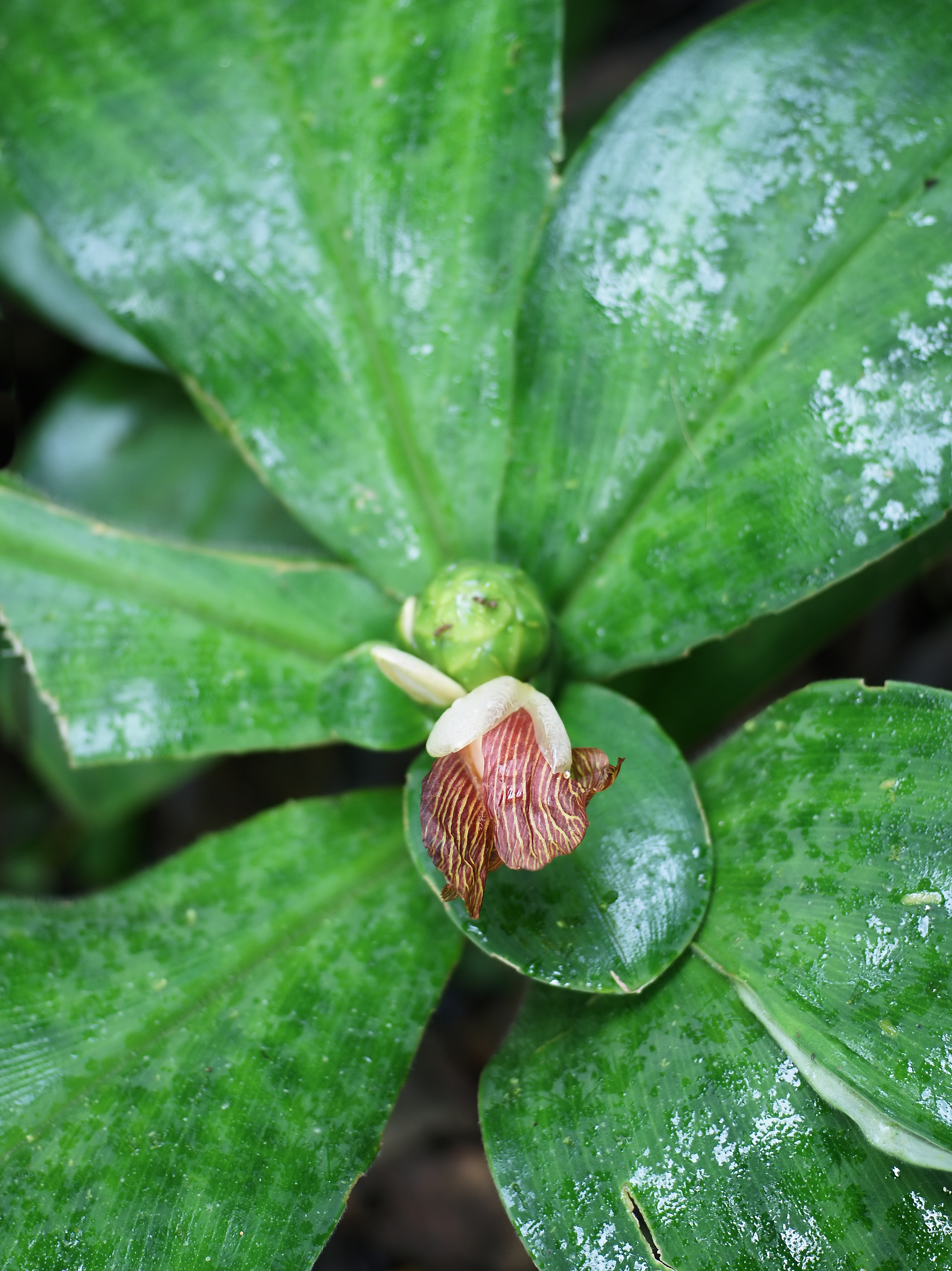

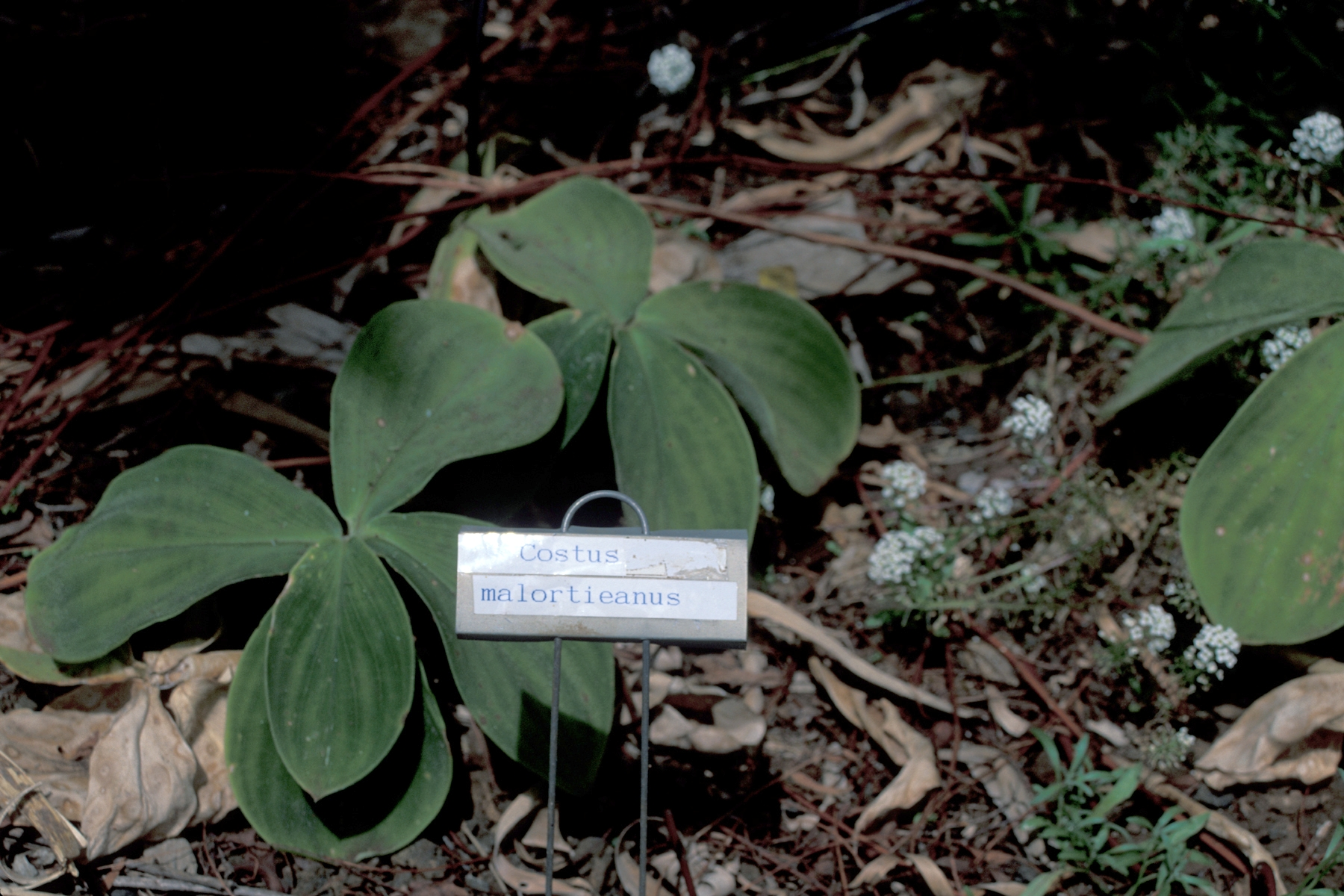

== See also ==
- List of least concern plants
