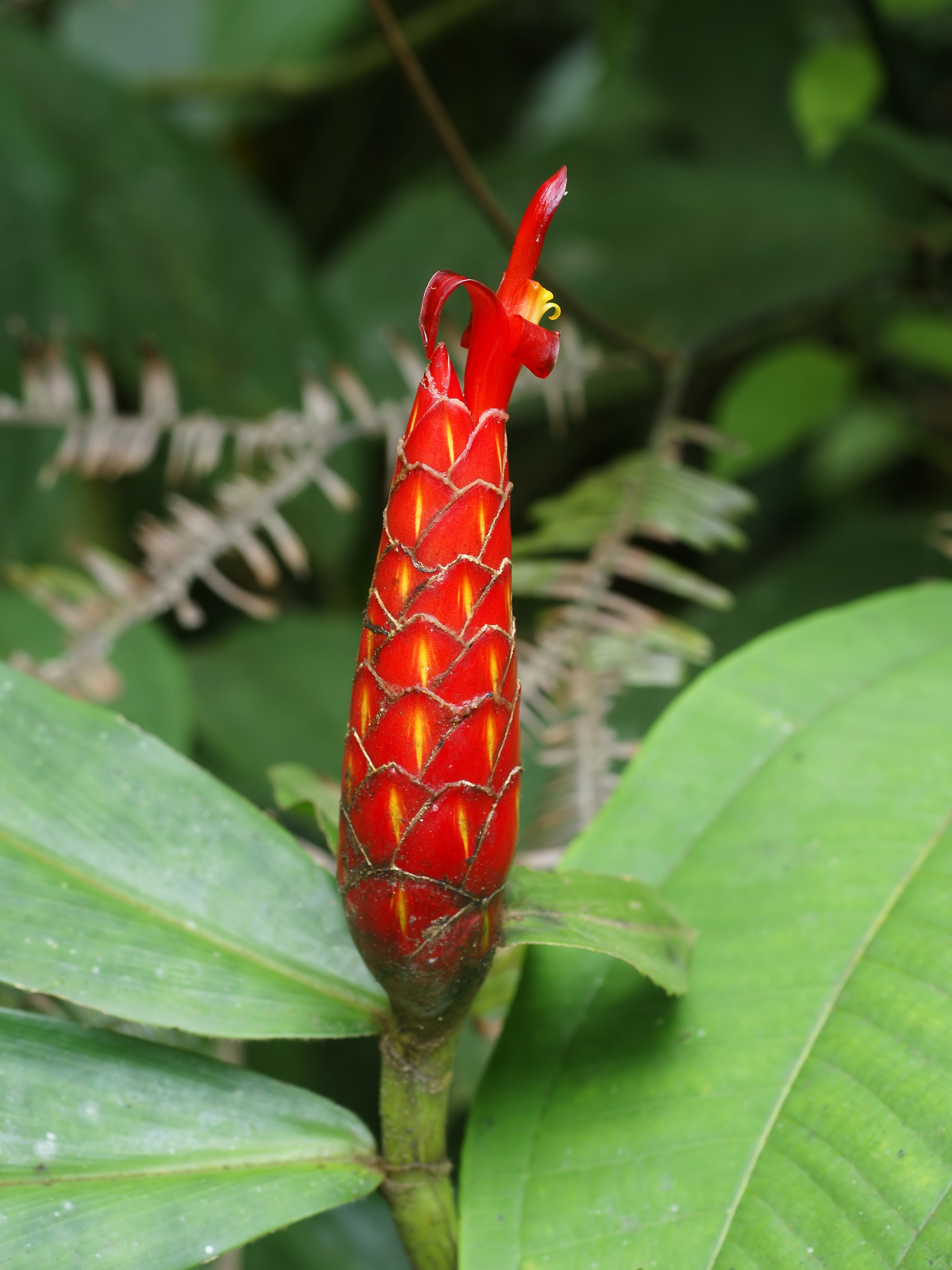
- Inflorescence
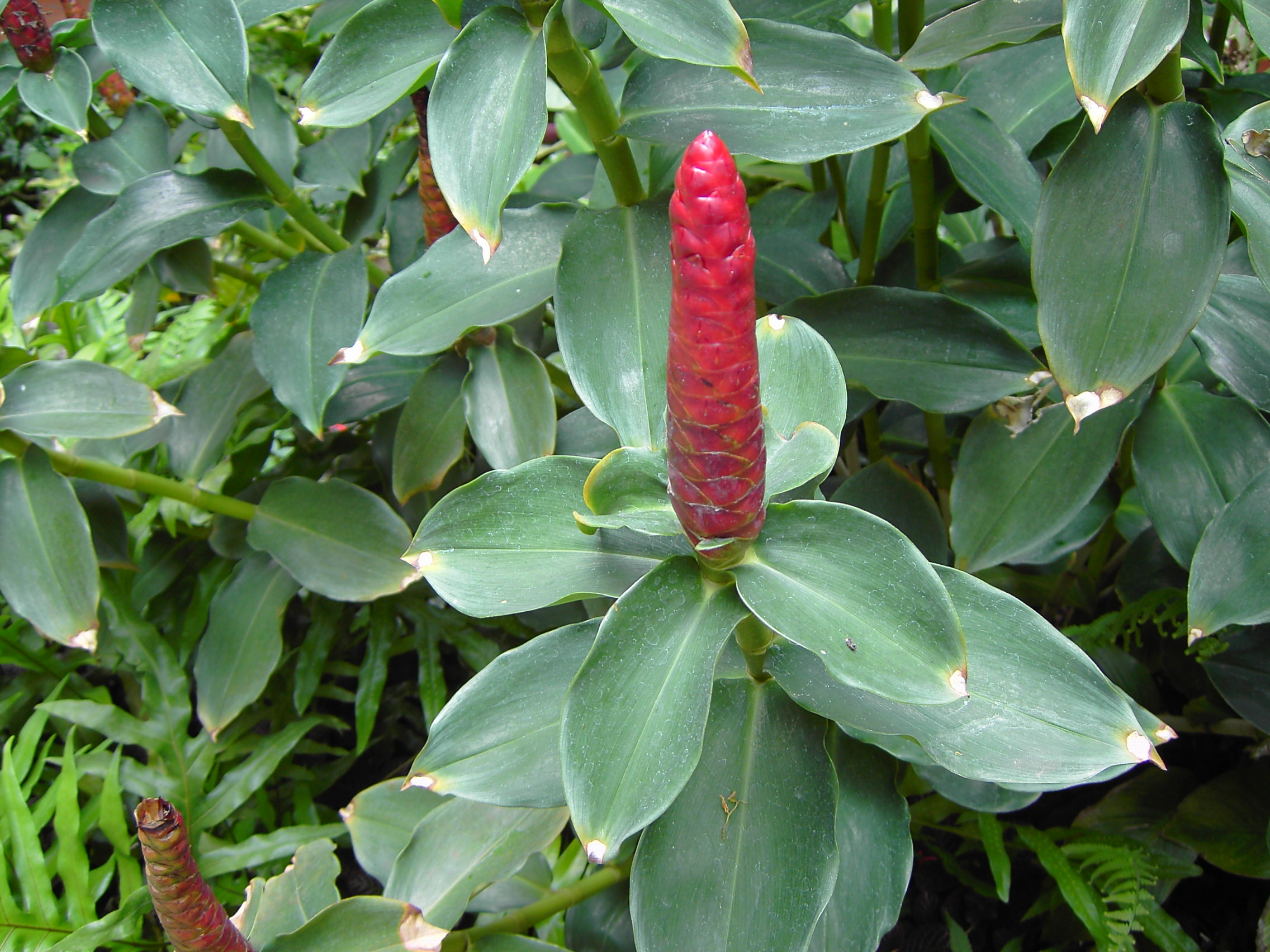
- Habit

Scientific classification
- Kingdom: Plantae
- Clade: Embryophytes
- Clade: Tracheophytes
- Clade: Spermatophytes
- Clade: Angiosperms
- Clade: Monocots
- Clade: Commelinids
- Order: Zingiberales
- Family: Costaceae
- Genus: Costus
- Species: C. pulverulentus

Binomial name
- Costus pulverulentus C.Presl

Synonyms
- Costus formosus C.V.Morton; Costus laxus Petersen; Costus ruber C.Wright ex Griseb.; Costus sanguineus Donn.Sm.

= Costus pulverulentus =

Species of plant

Costus pulverulentus, the red cigar or spiral ginger (a name it shares with other members of its family), is a species of flowering plant in the family Costaceae. It is native to Mexico, Central America, Colombia, Venezuela, and Ecuador, and it has been introduced to Cuba and Florida. It is invasive in Hawaii.

A rhizomatous perennial reaching 4 to 6 ft (1.2 to 1.8 m), Costus pulverulentus is typically found in wet tropical areas. It is used as an ornamental, and there are cultivars, including 'Serena', 'Pink Lips', and 'Purple Passion'.

Costus pulverulentus has a number of traditional medicinal applications. Ngäbe curanderos in Panama sell it to women suffering from pain after giving birth. In Ecuador, Costus pulverulentus is traditionally macerated and placed on snakebites by members of the Colorado people. They also apply the sap of the rachis to infected and swollen eyes. In Tlanchinol, Hidalgo, Mexico, a Costus pulverulentus infusion is made for people afflicted with kidney problems and fever.
