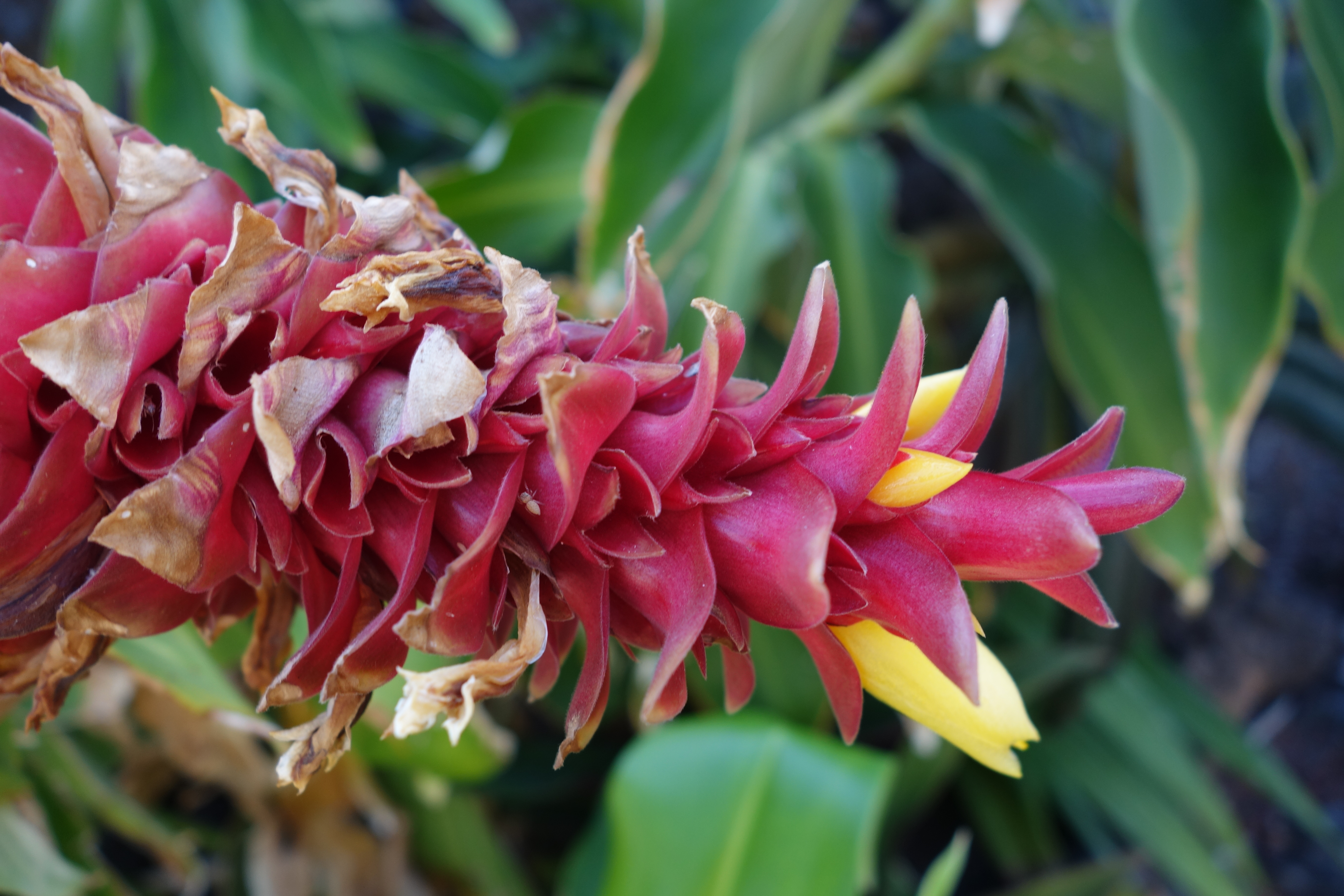

Conservation status
- Critically Endangered (IUCN 3.1)

Scientific classification
- Kingdom: Plantae
- Clade: Tracheophytes
- Clade: Angiosperms
- Clade: Monocots
- Clade: Commelinids
- Order: Zingiberales
- Family: Costaceae
- Genus: Costus
- Species: C. barbatus

Binomial name
- Costus barbatus Suess.

= Costus barbatus =

Species of flowering plant

Costus barbatus is a critically endangered species of plant native to Costa Rica.

Costus barbatus is a perennial plant with a red inflorescence. The foliage of Costus barbatus is dark green and fuzzy underneath. The long red inflorescences are complemented with bright yellow tubular flowers. Clumps spread easily and produce plants that normally get to six feet tall. Costus barbatus flowers all year round.

Costus barbatus is pollinated by hummingbirds.

The name Costus barbatus has often been mistakenly applied to Costus comosus. Costus comosus can be found in nurseries and botanical gardens, while Costus barbatus is not cultivated.
