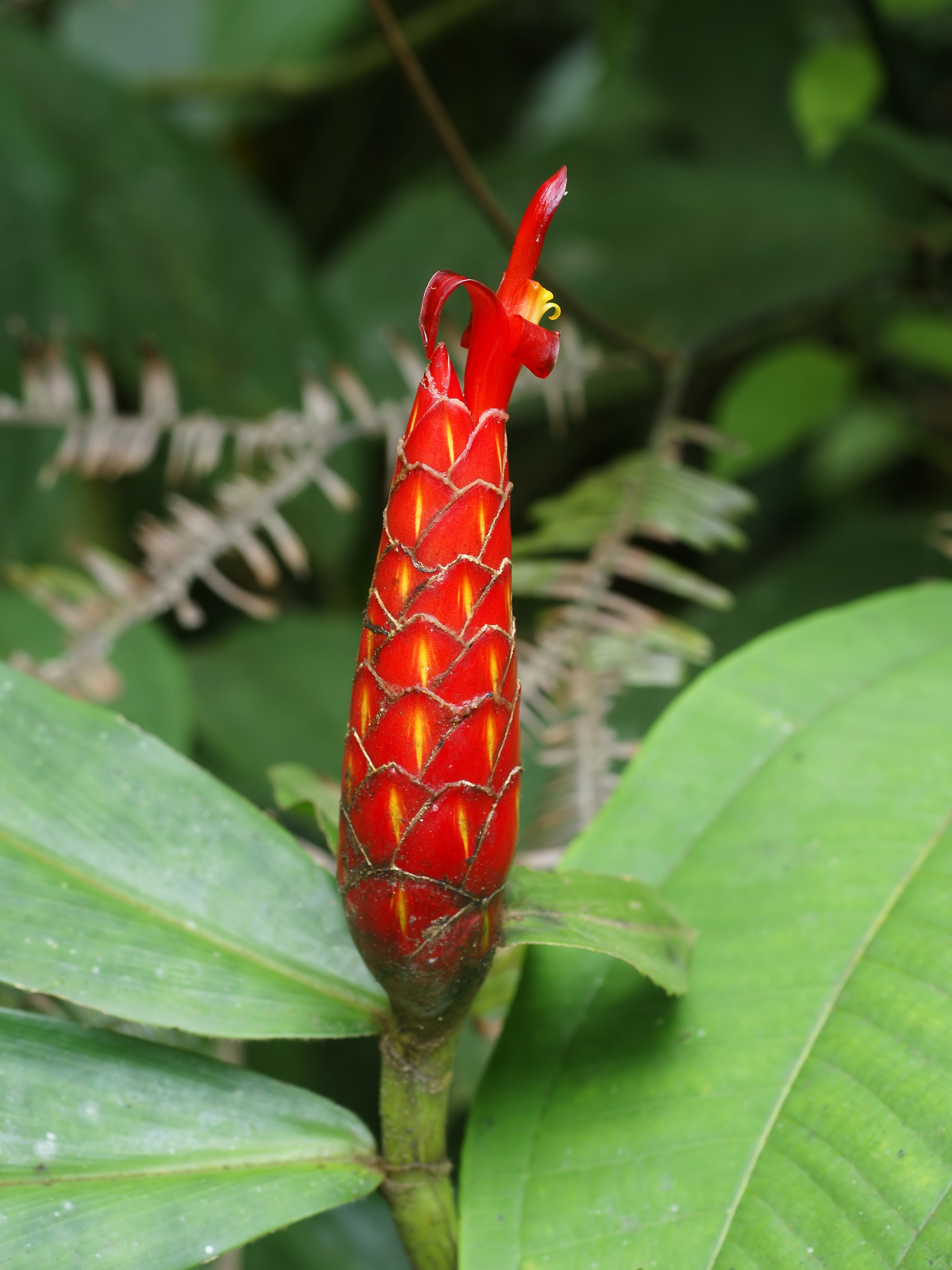
- Costus pulverulentus in Costa Rica

Scientific classification
- Kingdom: Plantae
- Clade: Tracheophytes
- Clade: Angiosperms
- Clade: Monocots
- Clade: Commelinids
- Order: Zingiberales
- Family: Costaceae
- Genus: Costus; L.

Synonyms
- Cadalvena Fenzl; Gissanthe Salisb.; Jacuanga T.Lestib.

= Costus =

Genus of flowering plants

Costus is a genus of herbaceous perennial plants in the family Costaceae, described by Linnaeus in 1753. It is widespread through tropical and subtropical regions of Asia, Africa, and the Americas.

Costus is often characterized and distinguished from relatives such as Zingiber (true ginger) by its spiraling stems. The genus as a whole is thus often called spiral gingers, but this can also refer to C. barbatus specifically. It is important not to confuse Costus scaber, C. spectabilis etc. with the herb known by the common name "costus".

Costus spectabilis is the floral emblem of Nigeria; its flowers are represented (erroneously in red instead of yellow color) on its coat of arms.

Costus productus and Costus guanaiensis are among the species of Costus with edible flowers. Other Costus species' flowers have also been determined to be edible.

Some Costus species have traditional medicinal and veterinary uses. For example, in Trinidad and Tobago, a mix of Costus scaber juice and crushed Renealmia alpinia berries is used to treat dogs bitten by snakes.

Costus naturally hybridizes, and commercial hybrids have also been produced.

== Species ==
As of June 2024, Plants of the World Online recognises 115 species, as follows:

- Costus acanthocephalus K.Schum.
- Costus acreanus (Loes.) Maas
- Costus acutissimus Maas & H.Maas
- Costus adolphi-friderici Loes.
- Costus afer Ker Gawl.
- Costus albiflos Maas & H.Maas
- Costus alfredoi Maas & H.Maas
- Costus allenii Maas
- Costus alleniopsis Maas & D.Skinner
- Costus alticola Maas & H.Maas
- Costus amazonicus (Loes.) J.F.Macbr.
- Costus antioquiensis Maas & H.Maas
- Costus arabicus L.
- Costus asplundii (Maas) Maas
- Costus asteranthus Maas & H.Maas
- Costus atlanticus E.M.Pessoa & M.Alves
- Costus aureus Maas & H.Maas
- Costus barbatus Suess.
- Costus beckii Maas & H.Maas
- Costus bicolor J.Braun & K.Schum.
- Costus bracteatus Rowlee
- Costus bullatus Meekiong, Muliati & Ipor
- Costus callosus Maas & H.Maas
- Costus chartaceus Maas
- Costus chrysocephalus K.Schum.
- Costus claviger Benoist
- Costus clemensiae Ridl.
- Costus cochabambae Maas & H.Maas
- Costus comosus (Jacq.) Roscoe
- Costus convexus Maas & D.Skinner
- Costus cordatus Maas
- Costus cupreifolius Maas
- Costus curvibracteatus Maas
- Costus dendrophilus K.Schum.
- Costus dinklagei K.Schum.
- Costus dirzoi García-Mend. & G.Ibarra
- Costus douglasdalyi Maas & H.Maas
- Costus dubius (Afzel.) K.Schum.
- Costus eburneus Meekiong, Muliati & Tawan
- Costus elegans Veitch ex J.Dix
- Costus erythrocoryne K.Schum.
- Costus erythrophyllus Loes.
- Costus erythrothyrsus Loes.
- Costus fenestralis Maas & H.Maas
- Costus fissicalyx N.R.Salinas, Clavijo & Betancur
- Costus flammulus K.M.Kay & P.Juárez
- Costus fortalezae K.Schum.
- Costus gabonensis Koechlin
- Costus geothyrsus K.Schum.
- Costus gibbosus D.Skinner & Maas
- Costus giganteus Welw. ex Ridl.
- Costus glaucus Maas
- Costus gracillimus Maas & H.Maas
- Costus guanaiensis Rusby
- Costus juruanus K.Schum.
- Costus kupensis Maas & H.Maas
- Costus laevis Ruiz & Pav.
- Costus lasius Loes.
- Costus lateriflorus Baker
- Costus ledermannii Loes.
- Costus leucanthus Maas
- Costus ligularis Baker
- Costus lilaceus Maas & H.Maas
- Costus lima K.Schum.
- Costus loangensis H.Maas & Maas
- Costus longibracteolatus Maas
- Costus louisii H.Maas & Maas
- Costus lucanusianus J.Braun & K.Schum.
- Costus maboumiensis Pellegr.
- Costus macranthus K.Schum.
- Costus microcephalus K.Schum.
- Costus mollissimus Maas & H.Maas
- Costus montanus Maas
- Costus mosaicus W.Bull
- Costus muluensis Meekiong, Ipor & Tawan
- Costus nimba H.Maas & Maas
- Costus nitidus Maas
- Costus obscurus D.Skinner & Maas
- Costus oligophyllus K.Schum.
- Costus oreophilus Maas & D.Skinner
- Costus osae Maas & H.Maas
- Costus phyllocephalus K.Schum.
- Costus pictus D.Don
- Costus pitalito C.D.Specht & H.Maas
- Costus plicatus Maas
- Costus plowmanii Maas
- Costus prancei Maas & H.Maas
- Costus productus Gleason ex Maas
- Costus pseudospiralis Maas & H.Maas
- Costus pulverulentus C.Presl
- Costus quasi-appendiculatus Woodson ex Maas
- Costus ricus Maas & H.Maas
- Costus rubineus D.Skinner & Maas
- Costus rumphianus Valeton ex K.Heyne
- Costus scaber Ruiz & Pav.
- Costus schlechteri H.J.P.Winkl.
- Costus sepacuitensis Rowlee
- Costus spectabilis (Fenzl) K.Schum.
- Costus spicatus (Jacq.) Sw.
- Costus spiralis (Jacq.) Roscoe
- Costus sprucei Maas
- Costus stenophyllus Standl. & L.O.Williams
- Costus sulfureus K.Schum.
- Costus talbotii Ridl.
- Costus tappenbeckianus J.Braun & K.Schum.
- Costus ulei Loes.
- Costus vargasii Maas & H.Maas
- Costus varzearum Maas
- Costus villosissimus Jacq.
- Costus vinosus Maas
- Costus whiskeycola Maas & H.Maas
- Costus wilsonii Maas
- Costus woodsonii Maas
- Costus zamoranus Steyerm.
- Costus zingiberoides J.F.Macbr.

Formerly placed here

Numerous other species have been called Costus over the years, but are now regarded as members of other genera. Such genera include Alpinia, Amomum, Caulokaempferia, Cheilocostus, Chamaecostus, Dimerocostus, Hellenia, Paracostus, Renealmia, Tapeinochilos, etc.

== Gallery ==
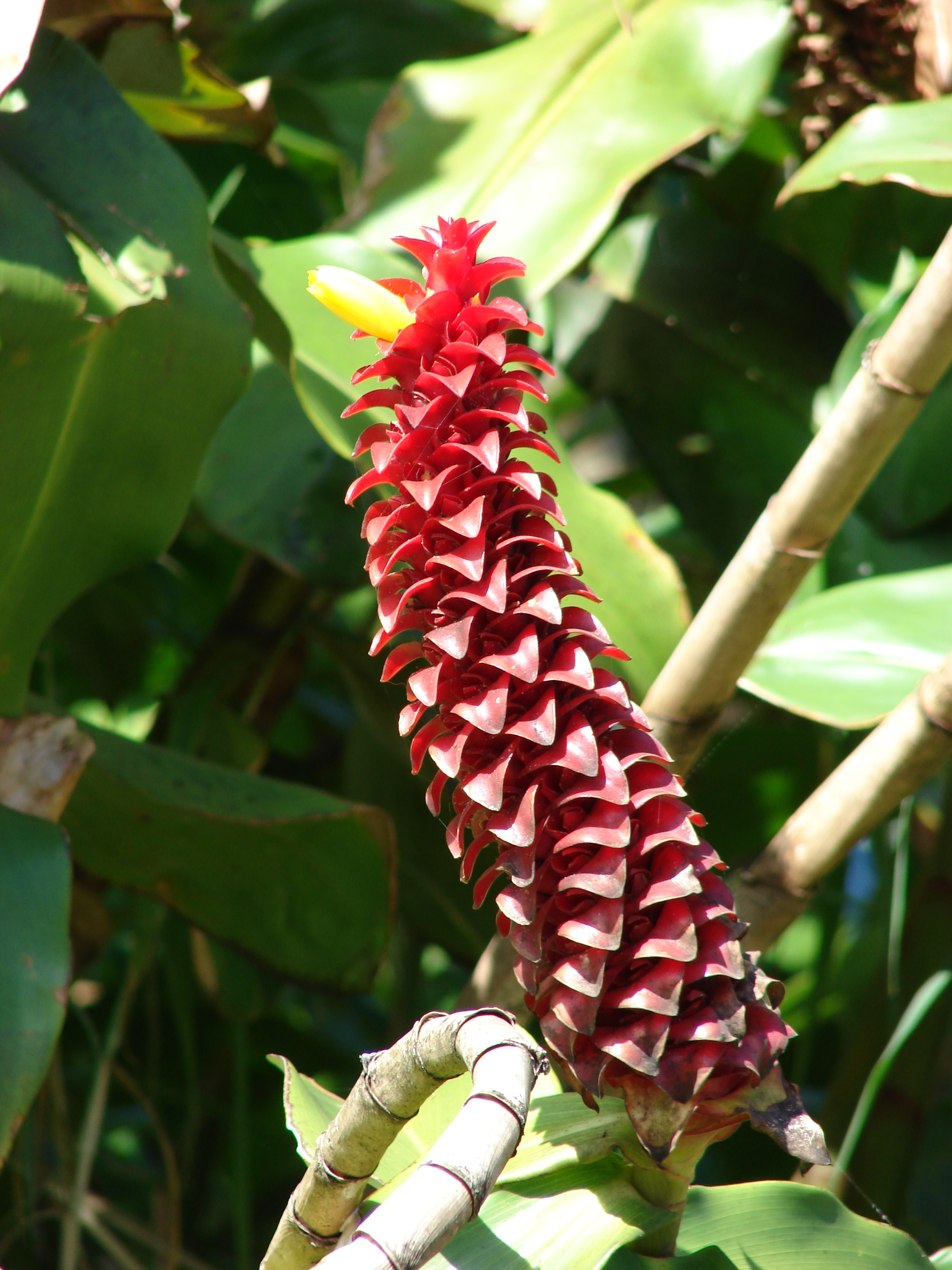
Costus comosus

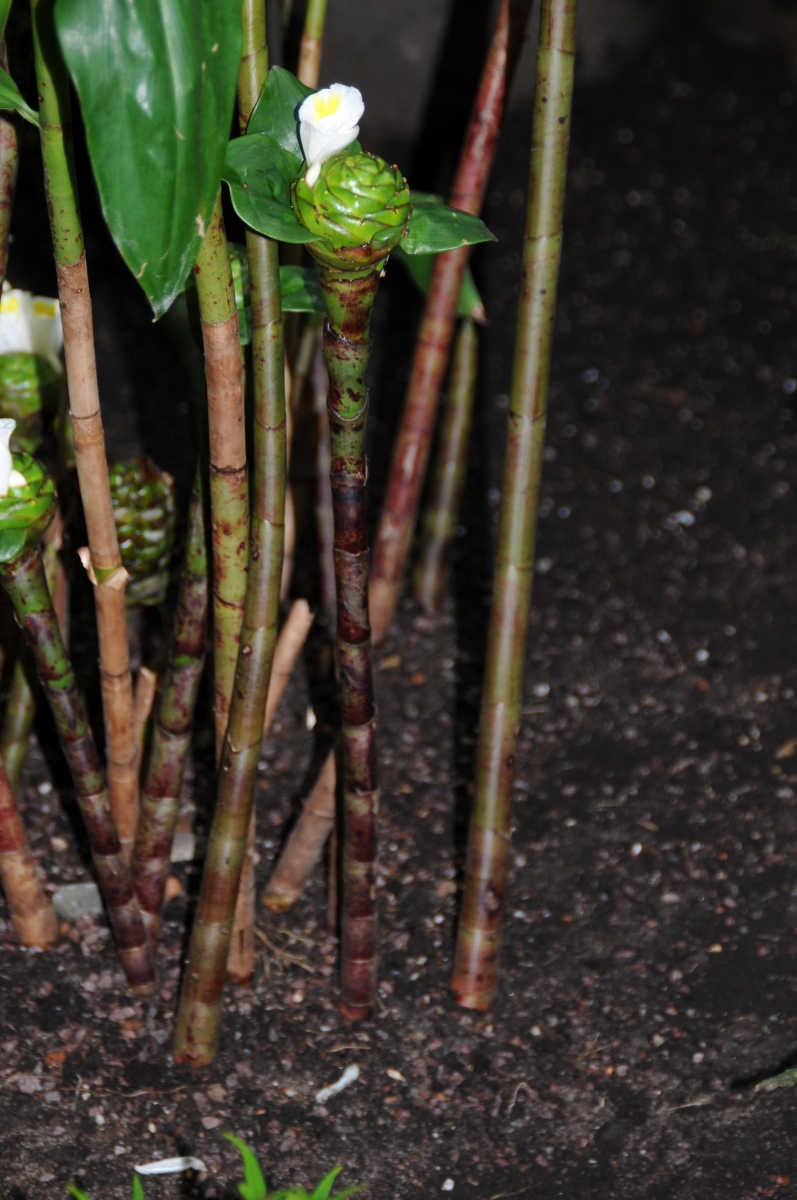
Costus dubius

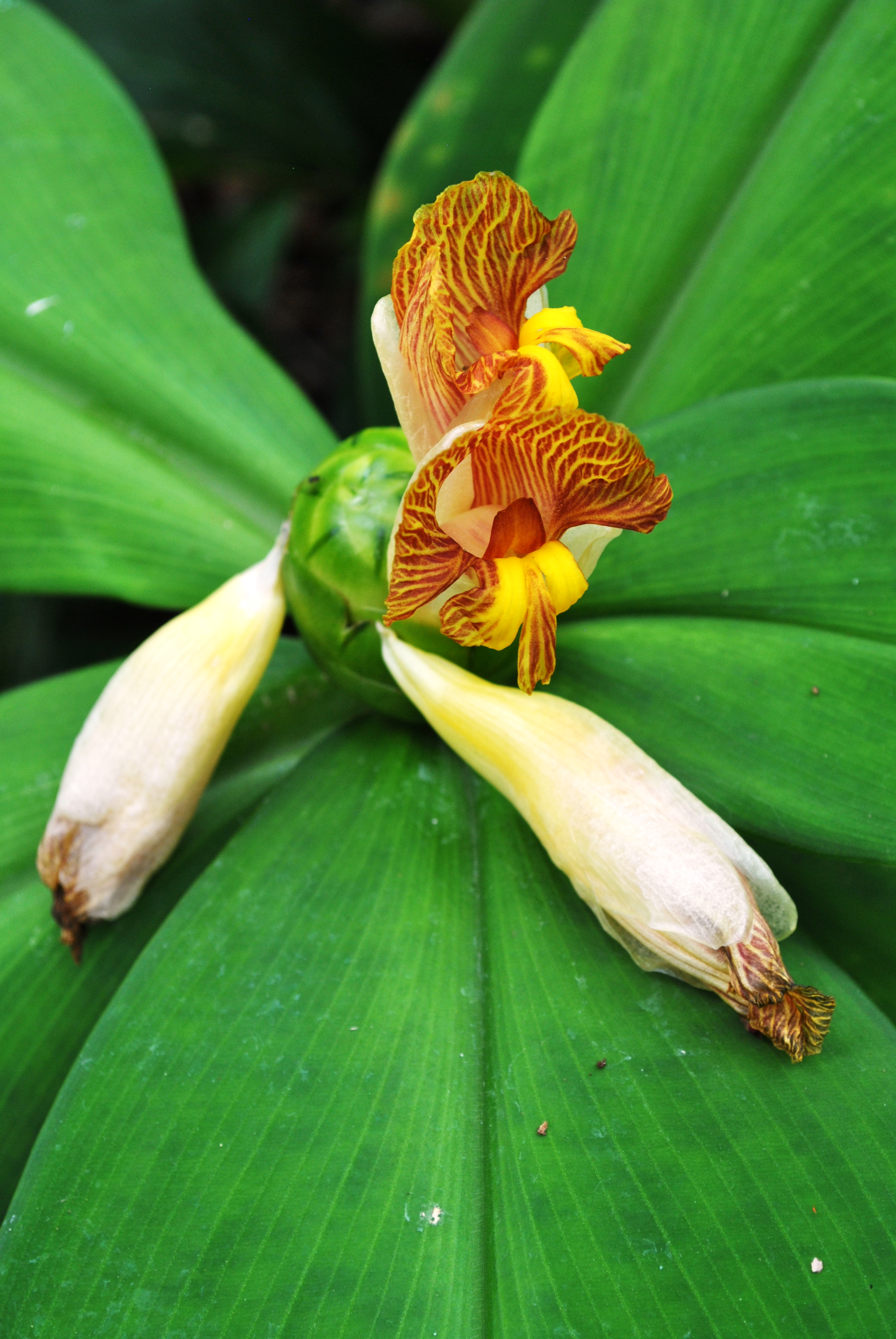
Costus malortieanus

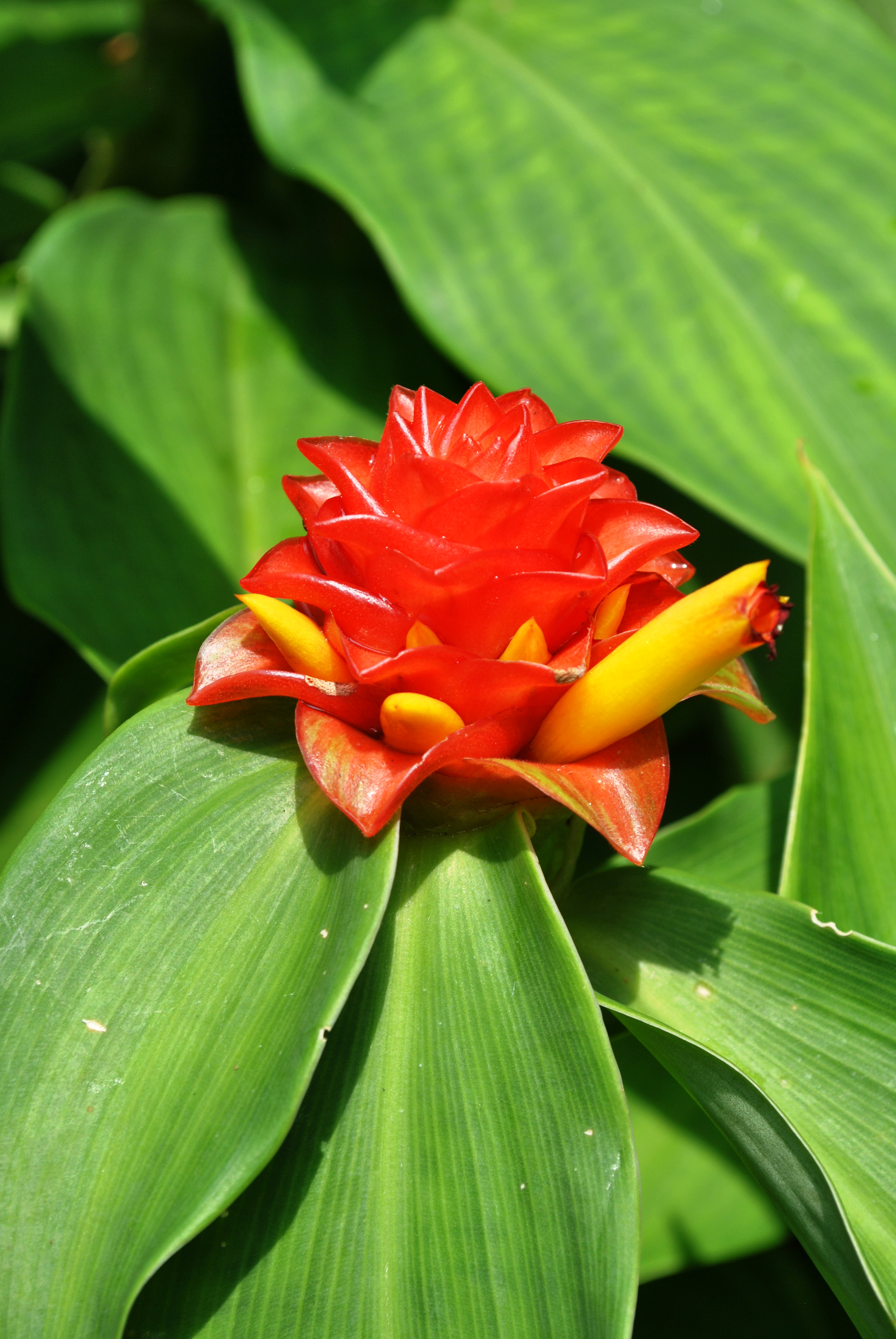
Costus productus

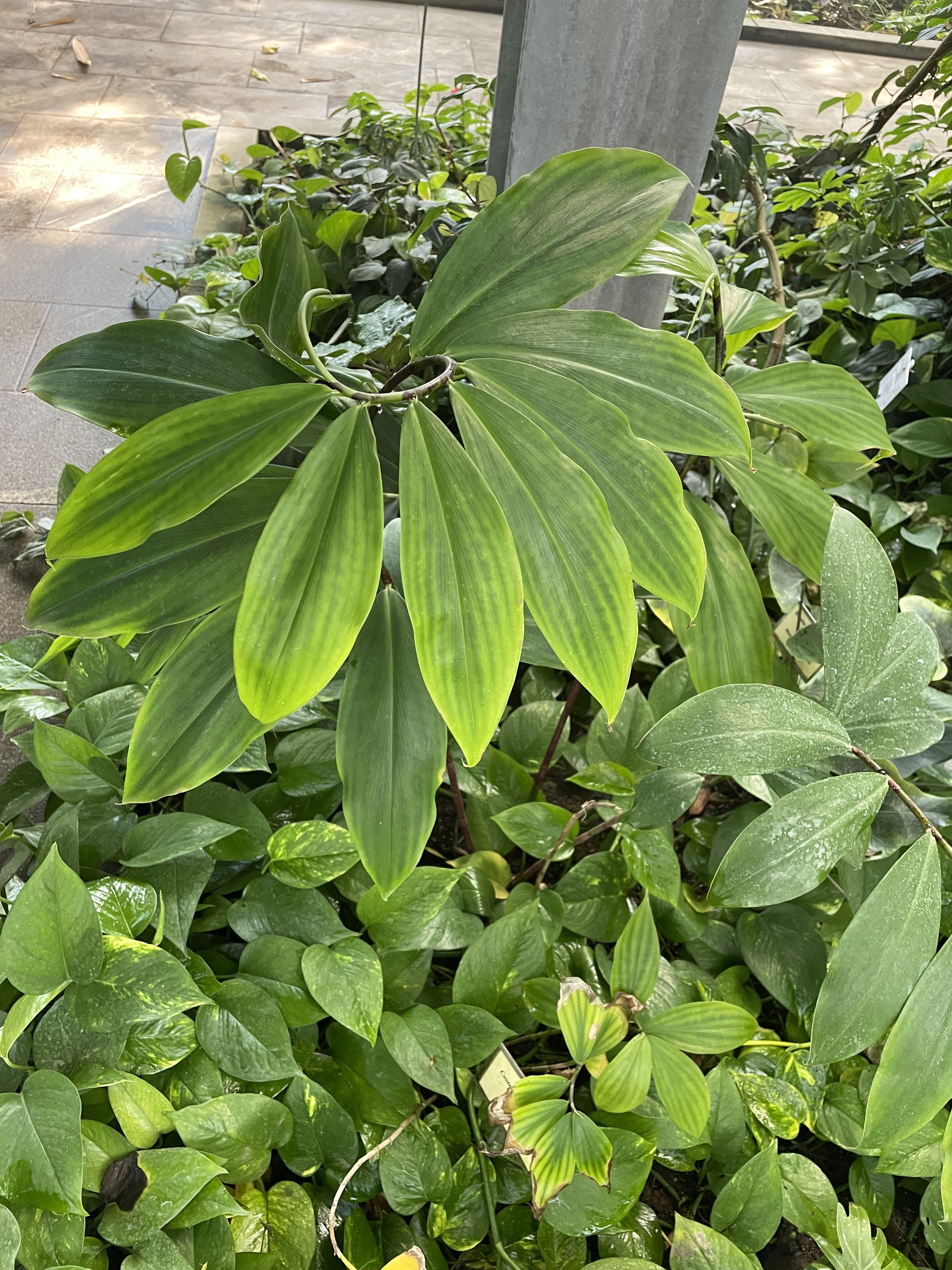
Costus dubius
