= List of lycaenid genera: O =

The large butterfly family Lycaenidae contains the following genera starting with the letter O:

- Oboronia
- Ocaria
- Oenomaus
- Ogyris
- Olynthus
- Orachrysops
- Oraidium
- Orcya
- Oreolyce
- Ornipholidotos
- Orthomiella
- Ostrinotes
- Otnjukovia
- Oxylides
