= Regio XIII Aventinus =

Historical region of Rome

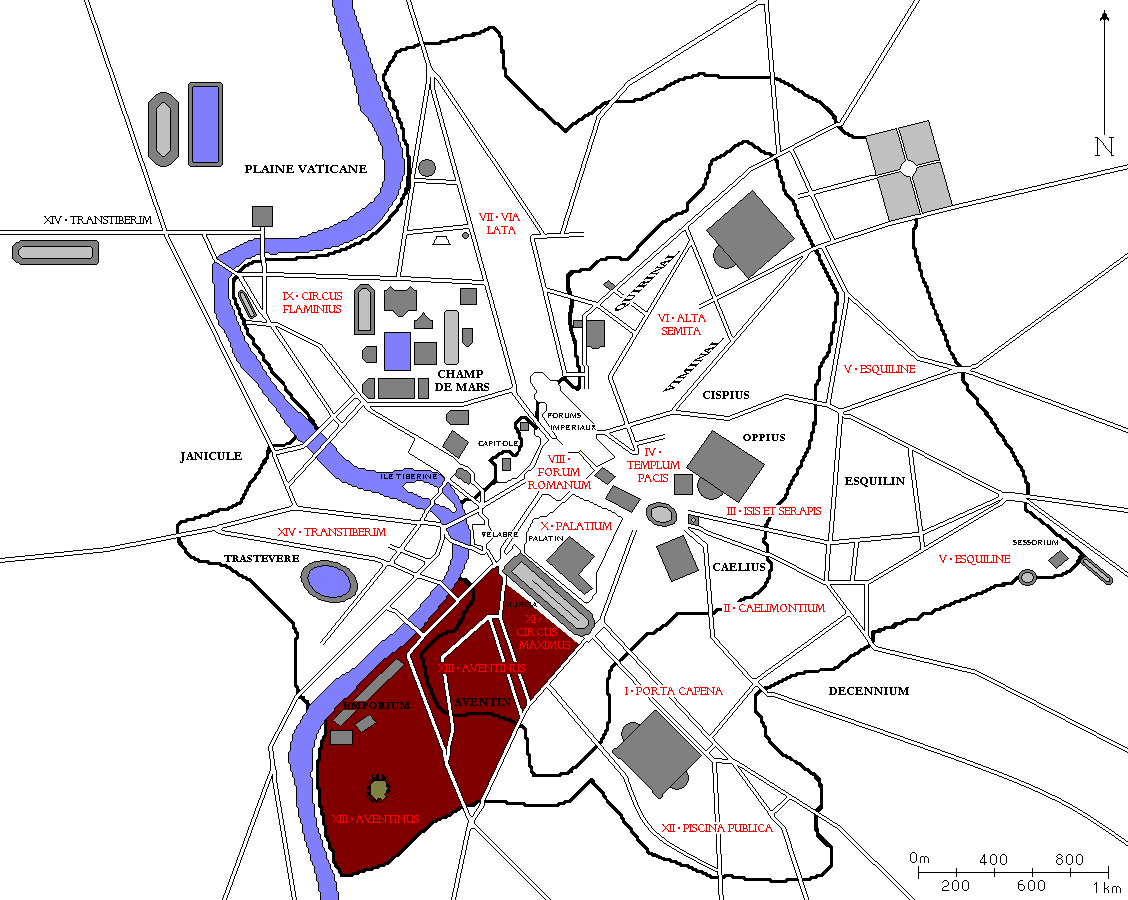

The Regio XIII Aventinus is the thirteenth regio of imperial Rome, under Augustus's administrative reform. Regio XIII took its name from the hill which dominated the region, the Aventine.

== Geographic extent and important features ==
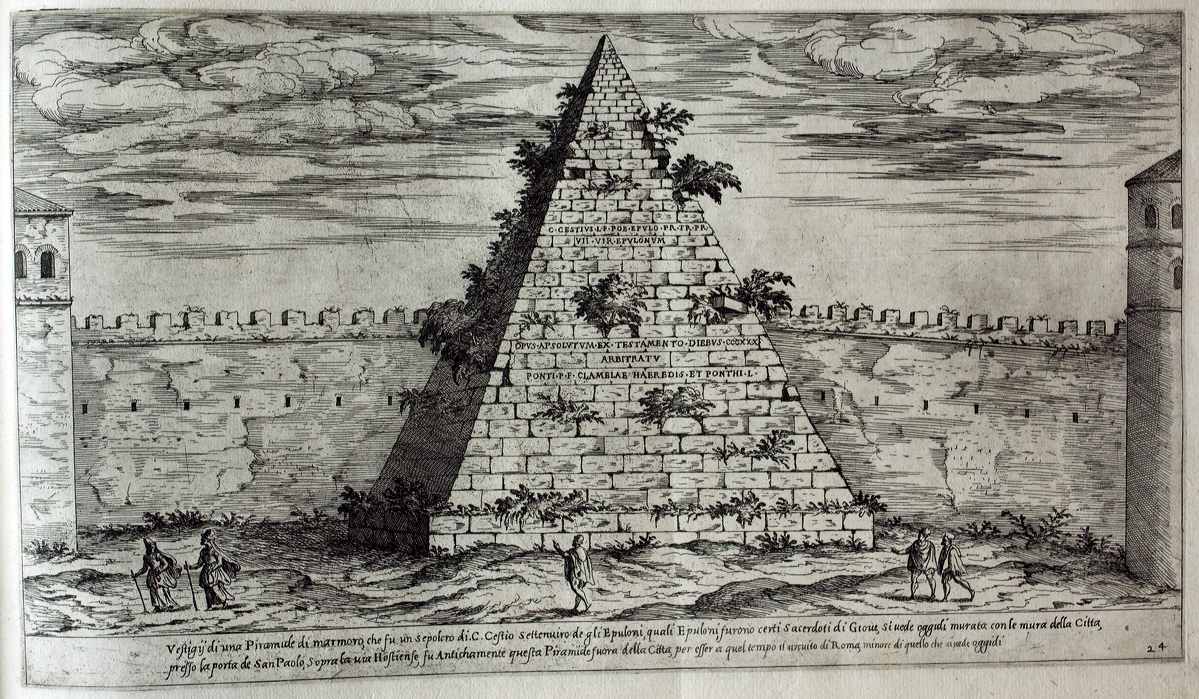
Drawing of the ruins of the Pyramid of Cestius (1575)

Regio XIII not only contained the Aventine Hill, but also the plain in front of it. In extent, this region was bordered by the Tiber River to the west, the Circus Maximus to the north, the Vicus Piscinae Publicae and the Via Ostiensis to the east, and the Aurelian Walls to the south. Its principal gate through the walls was the Porta Ostiensis. A measurement taken at the end of the 4th century recorded that the perimeter of the region was 18,000 Roman feet (approximately 5.3 km).

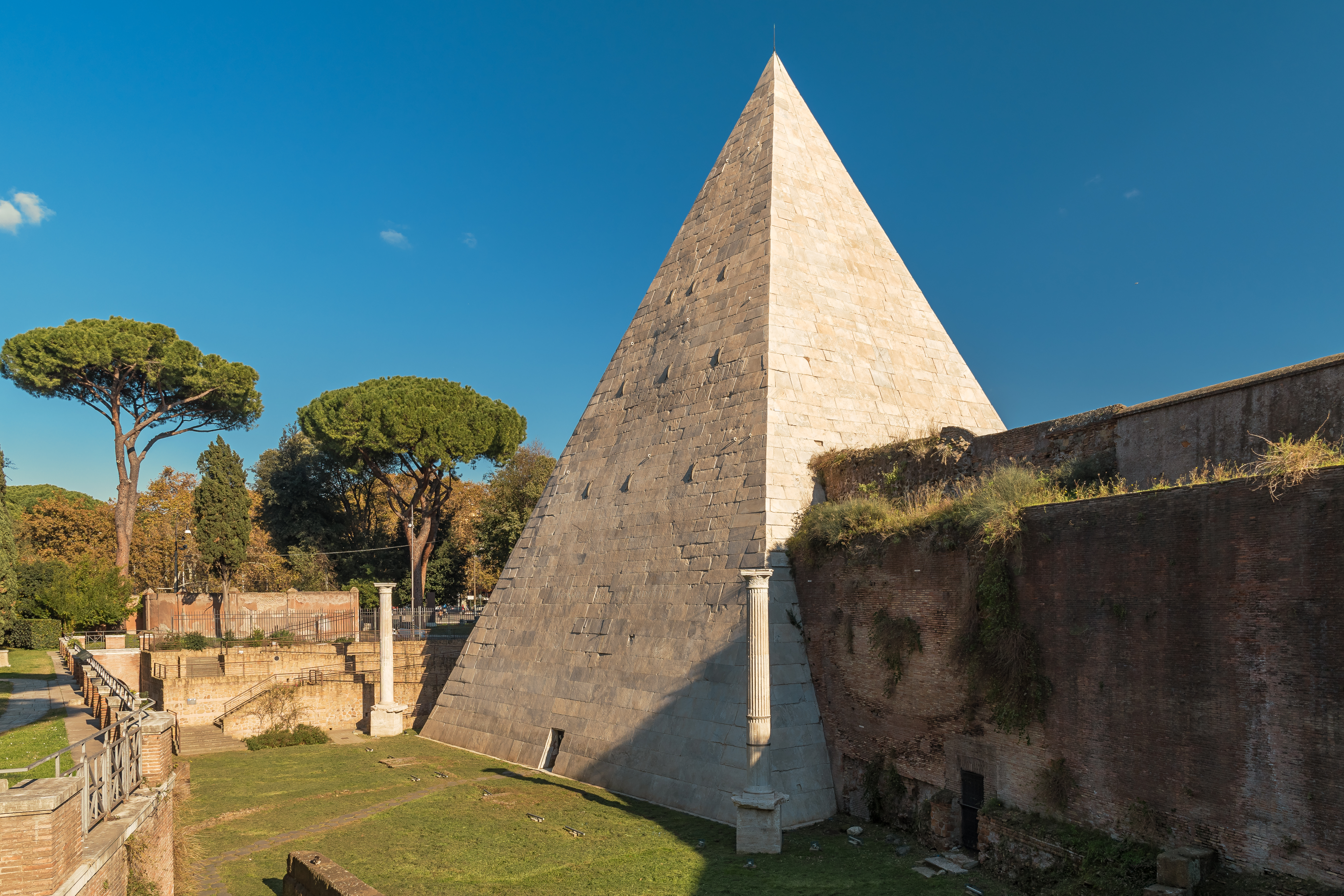
The Pyramid of Cestius

The region contained a number of temples, including the Temple of Diana (reportedly built by the king Servius Tullius), the Temple of Minerva and the Temple of Juno Regina. It also contained several baths, including the Baths of Licinius Sura and the Baths of Decius. In this region, the Armilustrium was also celebrated.

Regio XIII also contained the Emporium, the first port built on the Tiber, and attached to the port were the warehouses of the Horrea Galbae, built around the tomb of Servius Sulpicius Galba, while nearby was the Forum Pistorium. The region also possessed two unusual features still present today: Monte Testaccio, an artificial hill, and the Pyramid of Cestius. At the turn of the 5th century, the Regio contained 17aediculae (shrines), 130 domūs (patrician houses), 35 horrea (warehouses), 60 balneae (bath houses) and 88 loci (fountains).

== Subdivisions ==
At the turn of the 5th century, the Regio was divided into 17 vici (districts) and 2,487 insulae (blocks). It had two curators and was served by 48 Roman magistrates.
