= Oboronia albicosta =

Scientific classification
- Domain: Eukaryota
- Kingdom: Animalia
- Phylum: Arthropoda
- Class: Insecta
- Order: Lepidoptera
- Family: Lycaenidae
- Genus: Oboronia
- Species: O. albicosta

Binomial name
- Oboronia albicosta (Gaede, 1916)

Synonyms
- Cupido albicosta Gaede, 1916

Species of butterfly

Oboronia albicosta is a butterfly in the family Lycaenidae. It is found in Cameroon, the Democratic Republic of the Congo (Equateur, Kinshasa, Sankuru, Lualaba and Kivu), Uganda (from the south-western part of the country to Bwamba) and Zambia. In Seitz it is described - Forewing only at the base feebly dusted with dark, at the distal margin somewhat broader black than pseudopunctatus, more like punctatus. On the hindwing the marginal band is as broad as in punctatus, but the white rings in it are only indistinctly pronounced. Beneath on both wings the black eyespots with white rings are more distinct than in punctatus. On the hindwing all the marginal spots are black, not only that in area 2, which shows blue scales, like in punctatus. The costal margin of the hindwing lacks the spot, and there are only traces noticeable of submarginal yellow lines at the proximal margin and between R 4 and R. 6. Expanse of wings: 30 mm.
