= Galba (disambiguation) =

Galba (3 BC – AD 69) was Roman emperor for seven months from 68 to 69.

Galba may also refer to:

== People ==
- Sulpicius Galba (disambiguation), ancient Romans
- Galba (Suessiones) (fl. mid-1st century BC), king of the Belgic tribe Suessiones during Julius Caesar's conquest of Gaul
- Karol Galba (1921–2009), Slovak football referee
- Martí Joan de Galba (died 1490), Catalan writer
- Sir Galba (1919–1957), Grenadian singer

== Place and jurisdictions ==
- Ancient Castra Galbae (or Castra Galbæ), presumably named after one of the above
- Hamlet in Cobargo, Australia

== Animals ==
- Spialia galba, a species of butterfly
- Luthrodes galba, a butterfly
- Galba (butterfly), an invalid genus of butterflies in the family Lycaenidae
- Galba (gastropod), a genus of freshwater gastropod in the family Lymnaeidae

== Other uses ==
- Galba (automobile), a French cyclecar from 1929

== See also ==
- Gramm–Leach–Bliley Act (GLBA; Financial Services Modernization Act of 1999) U.S. federal law
- Gabla (disambiguation)
