= Geomorphosite =

Landform of scientific or social value

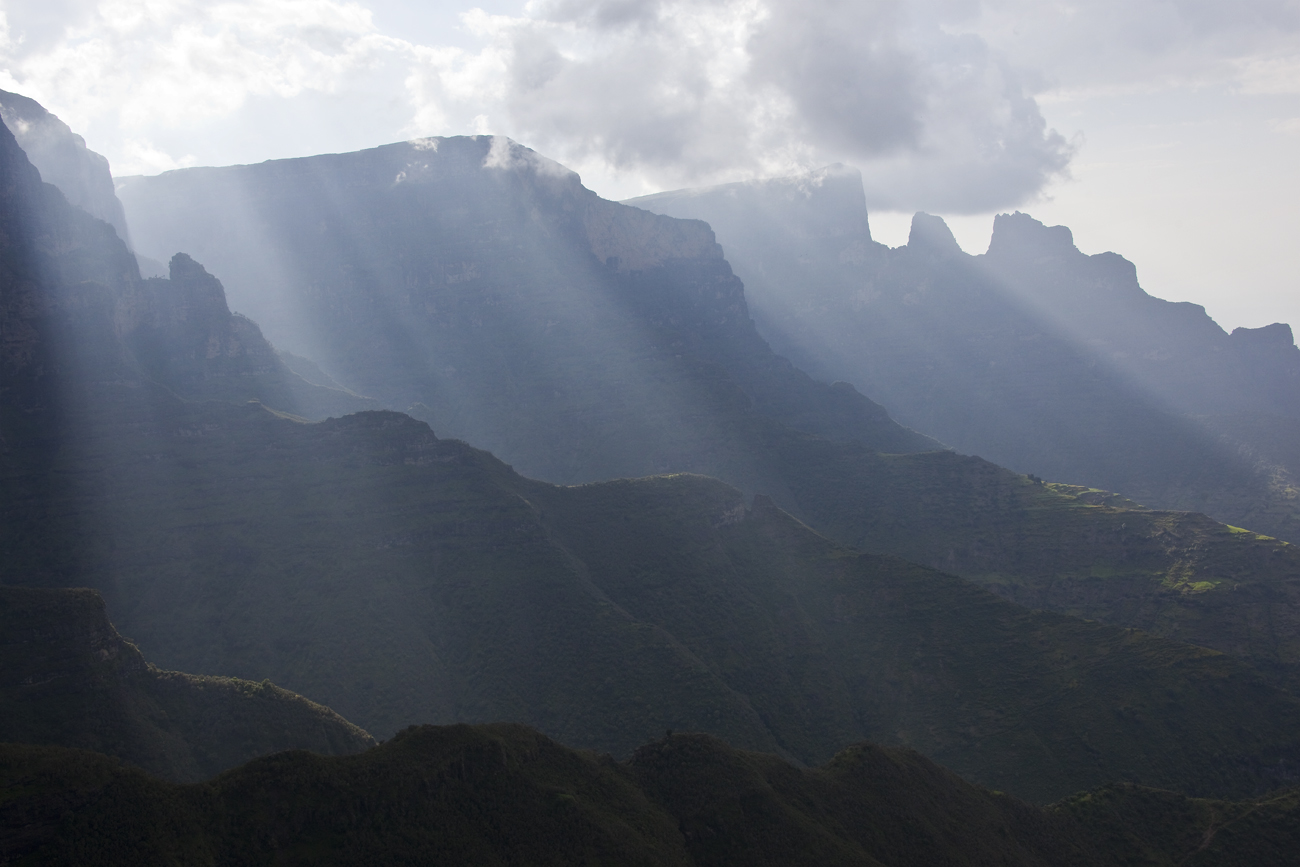
The Simien Mountains National Park in Ethiopia hosts a rich array of geomorphosites

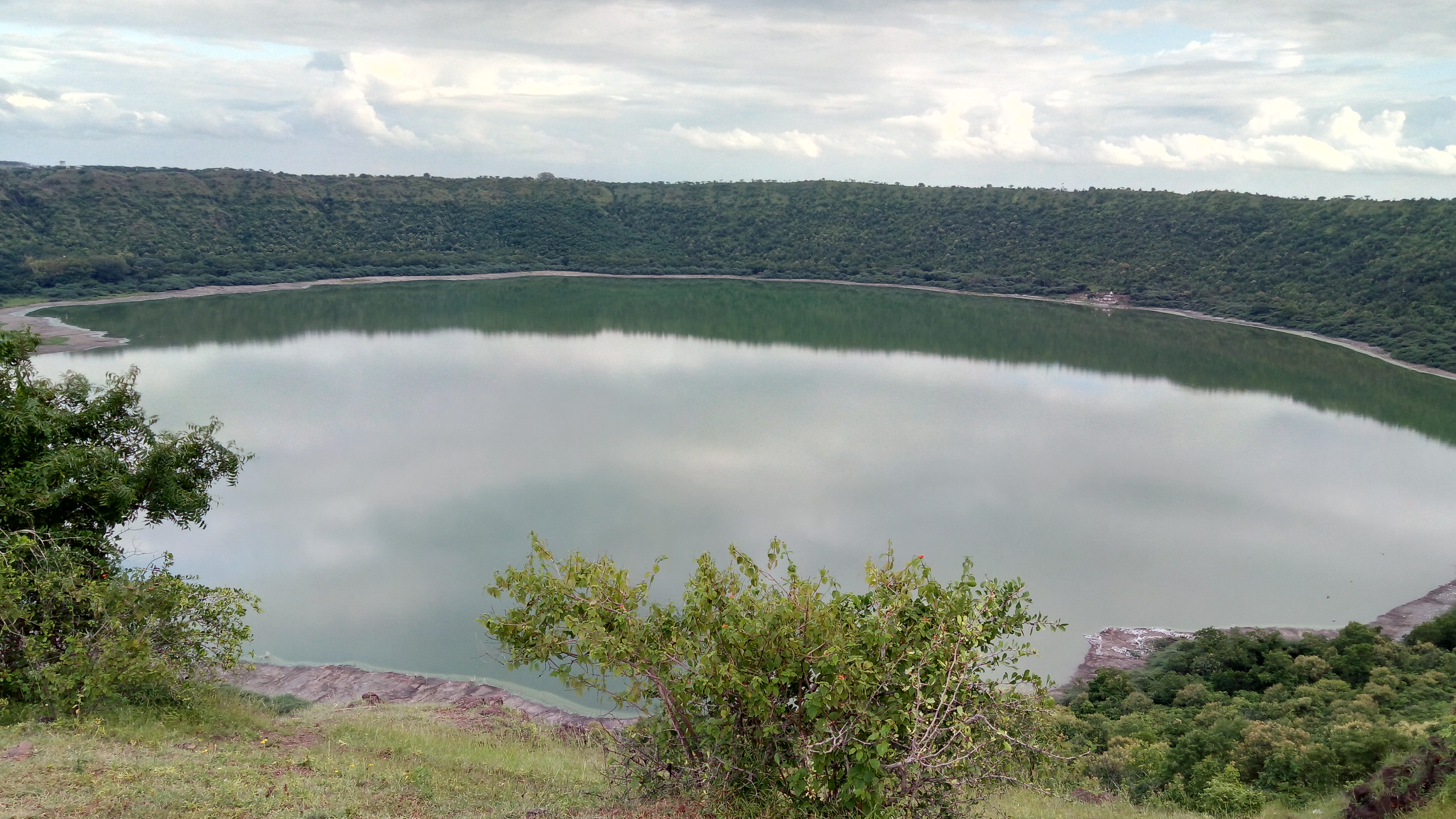
The Lonar Lake in Buldhana district, Maharashtra, India

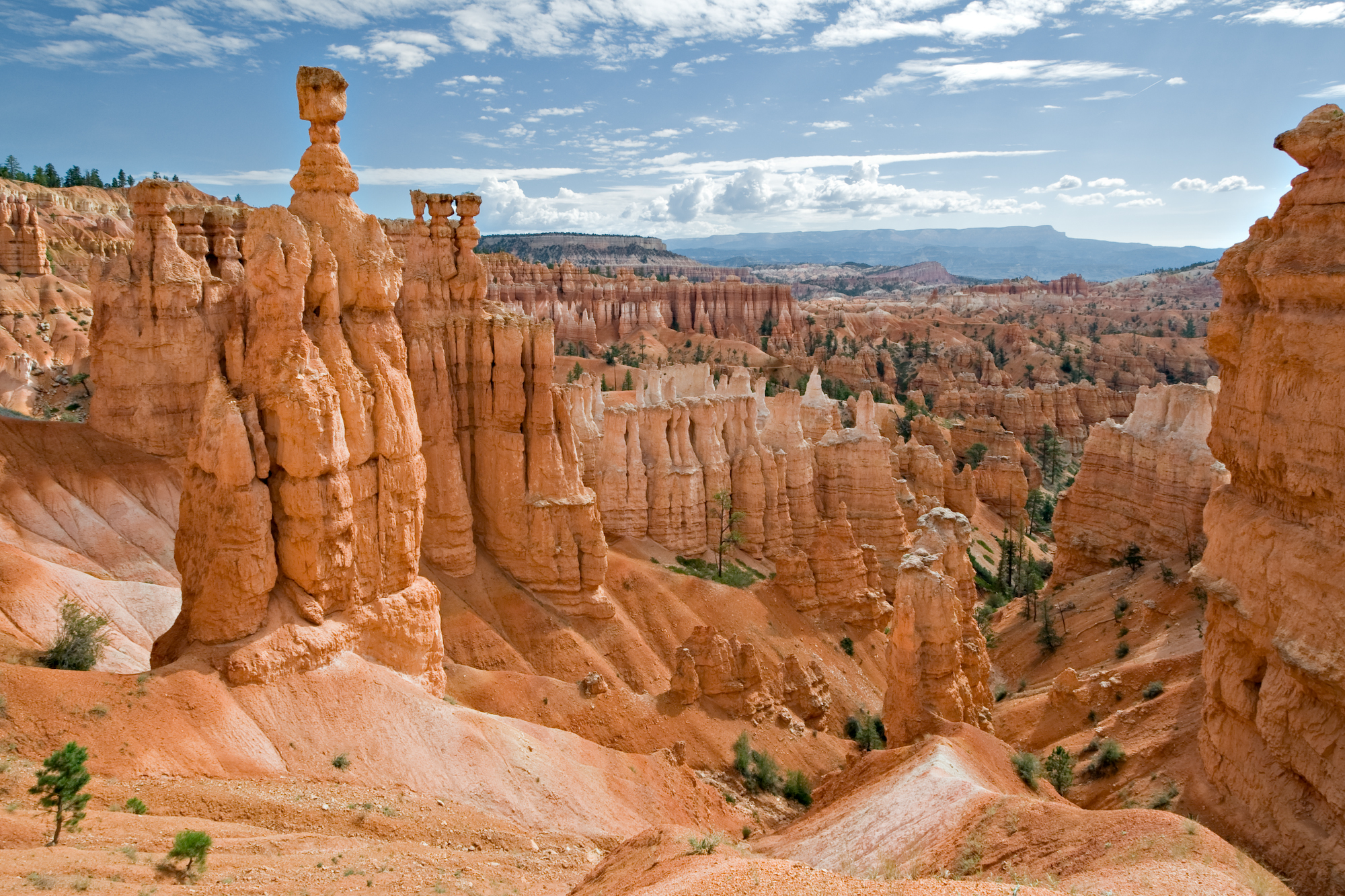
Hoodoos in Bryce Canyon National Park, Utah

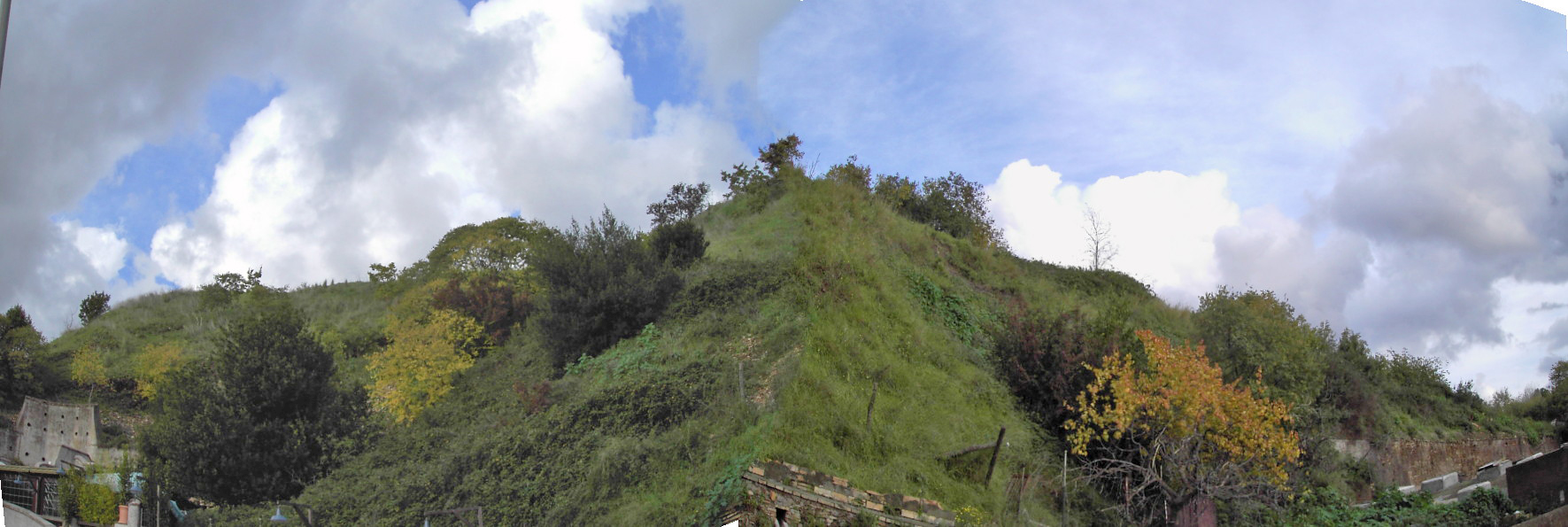
Monte Testaccio in Rome

A geomorphosite, or geomorphological heritage site, is a landform or an assemblage of landforms that have a scientific, educational, historic-cultural, aesthetic or socio-economic value.

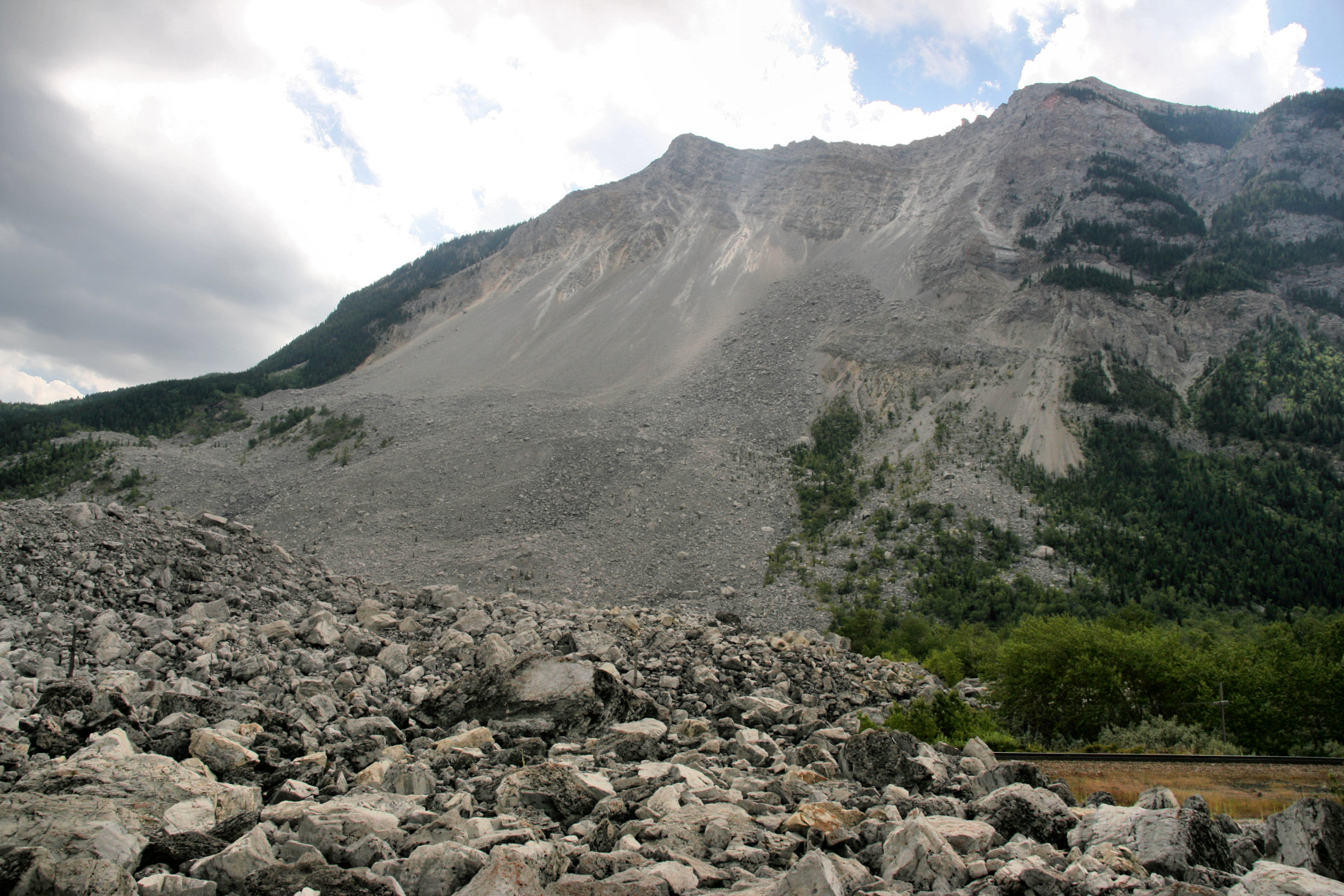
The Frank Slide is a geomorphosite

Geomorphosites are included among the geoheritage sites (geosites) and may comprise landforms (or sites of former landforms) that have been hidden or destroyed due to human activities, as well as anthropogenic landforms of archaeological or historical interest.

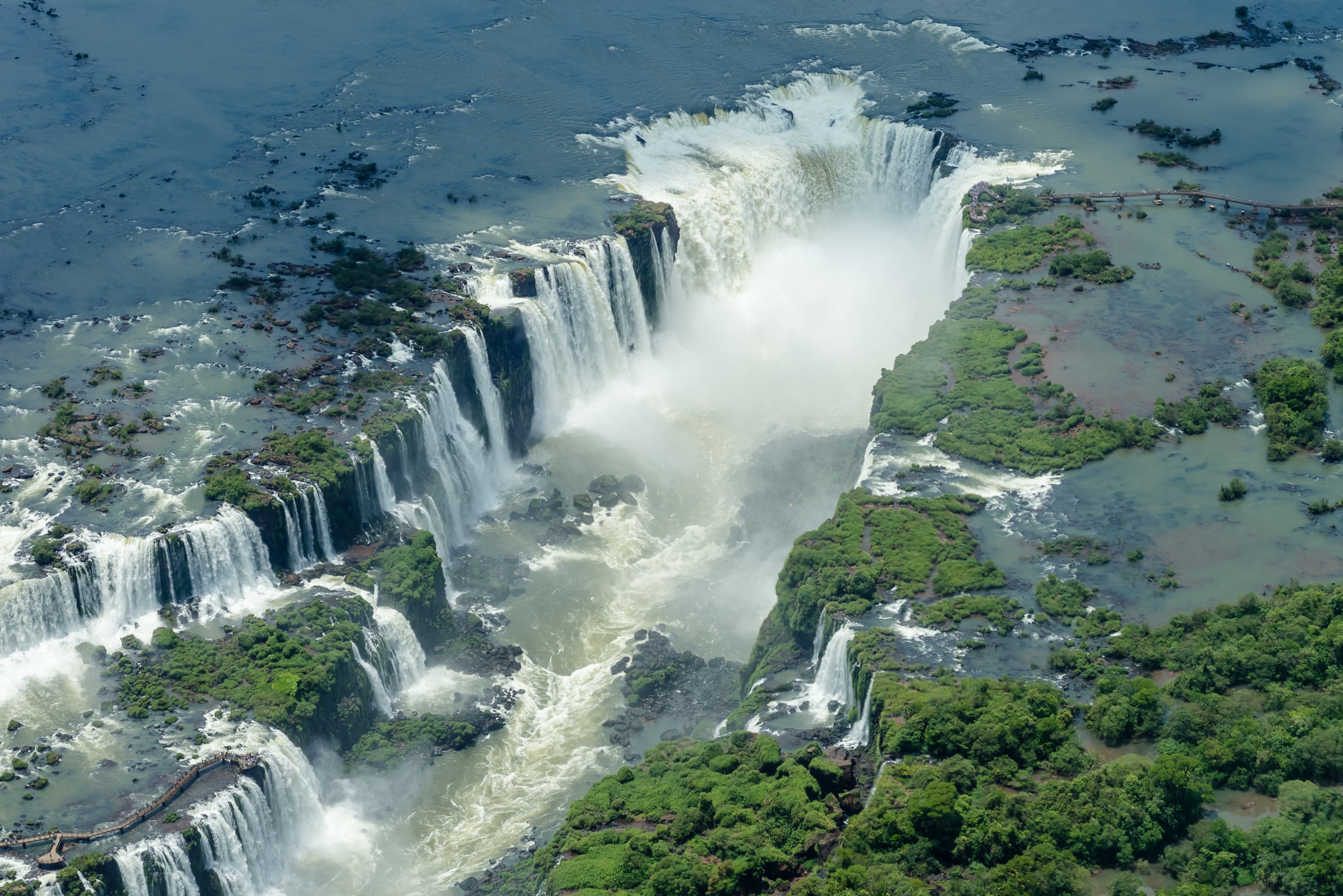
Iguazu Falls on the border of Argentina and Brasil

The value of a geomorphosite, for purposes of analysis, comparison and protection, can be qualitatively assessed using several methods. Some of these methods are based only on expert judgements and a few evaluation criteria, while others involve assigning a qualitative score to each relevant characteristic of a site (e.g. its scientific importance, educational value etc.) and then weighting and summing (or ranking) the scores to obtain the site's overall value (or rank).

The concept of geomorphosite has its roots in Western scientific thought. In recent decades, natural heritage conservation has increasingly focused on preserving representative examples of specific natural phenomena. This shift aligns with the growing influence of scientific approaches and economic rationalism, which often prioritize objective, data-driven arguments over those perceived as emotional or subjective. However, this representative methodology may not be suitable, for instance, for sites considered sacred by faith communities, as these locations are unique and hold profound spiritual significance that transcends scientific categorization. A solution to this problem may be to consider multiple value dimensions of a geomorphosite and to include into the evaluation process the interested stakeholders and right holders (e.g. indigenous communities), which also ensures a greater degree of objectivity in the evaluation itself.

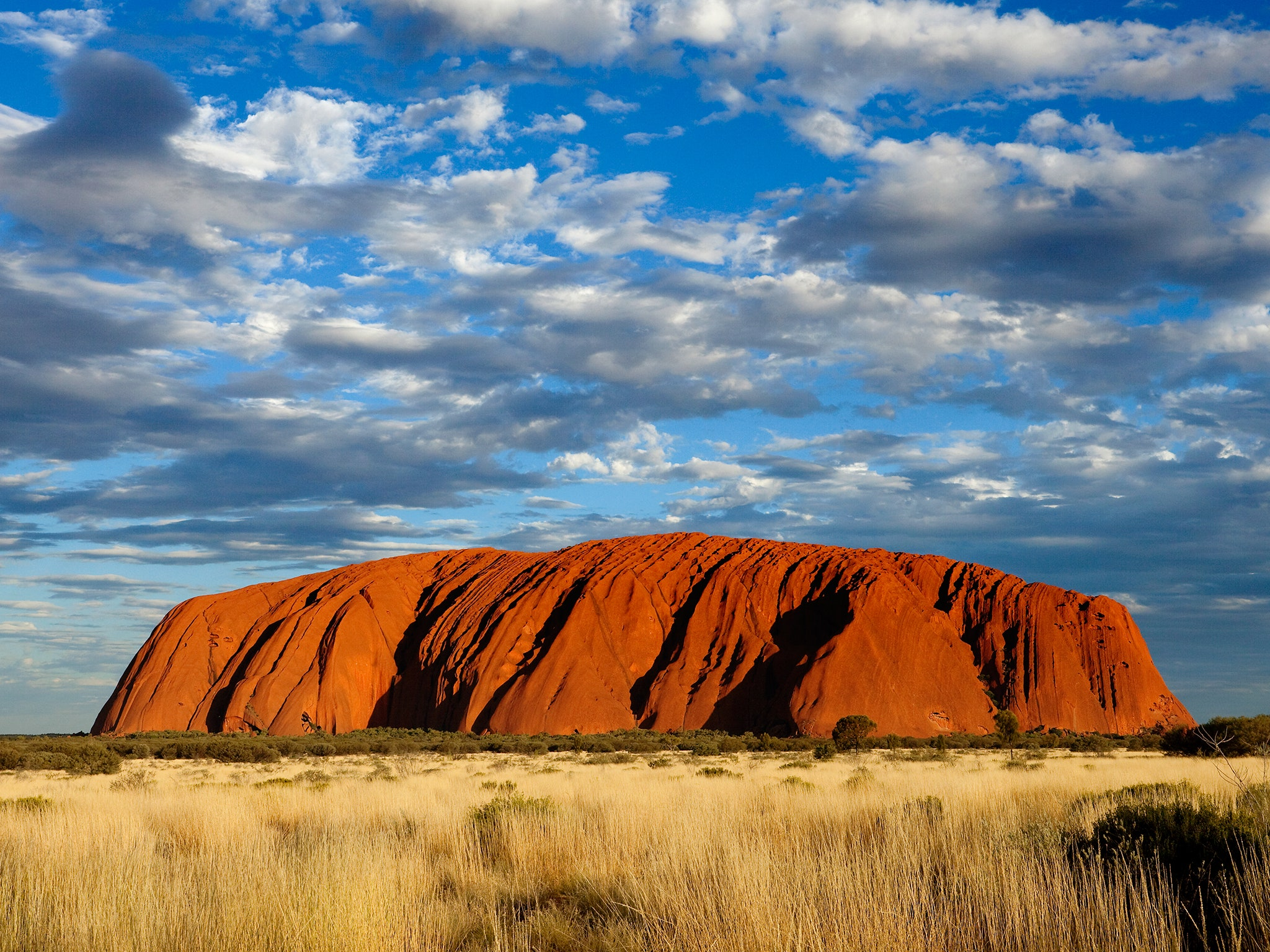
Uluru, one of the largest and best known inselbergs in the world, which constitute a fundamental landform in the traditional belief of Aṉangu people. It was added to the UNESCO World Heritage List in 1987

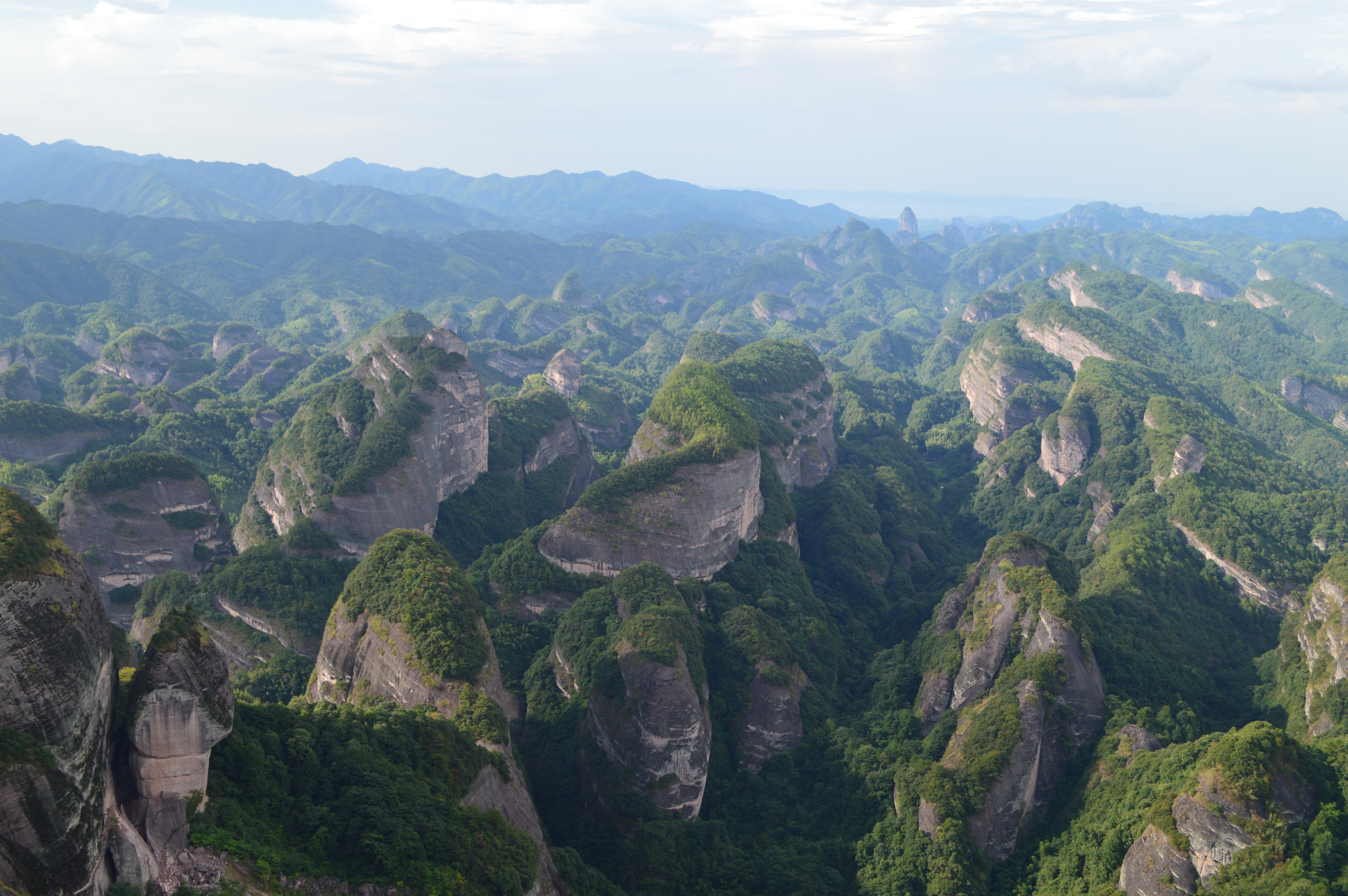
Mount Langshan in Xinning County, Hunan, China, part of the China Danxia collection of landforms that entered the World Heritage List in 2010.
