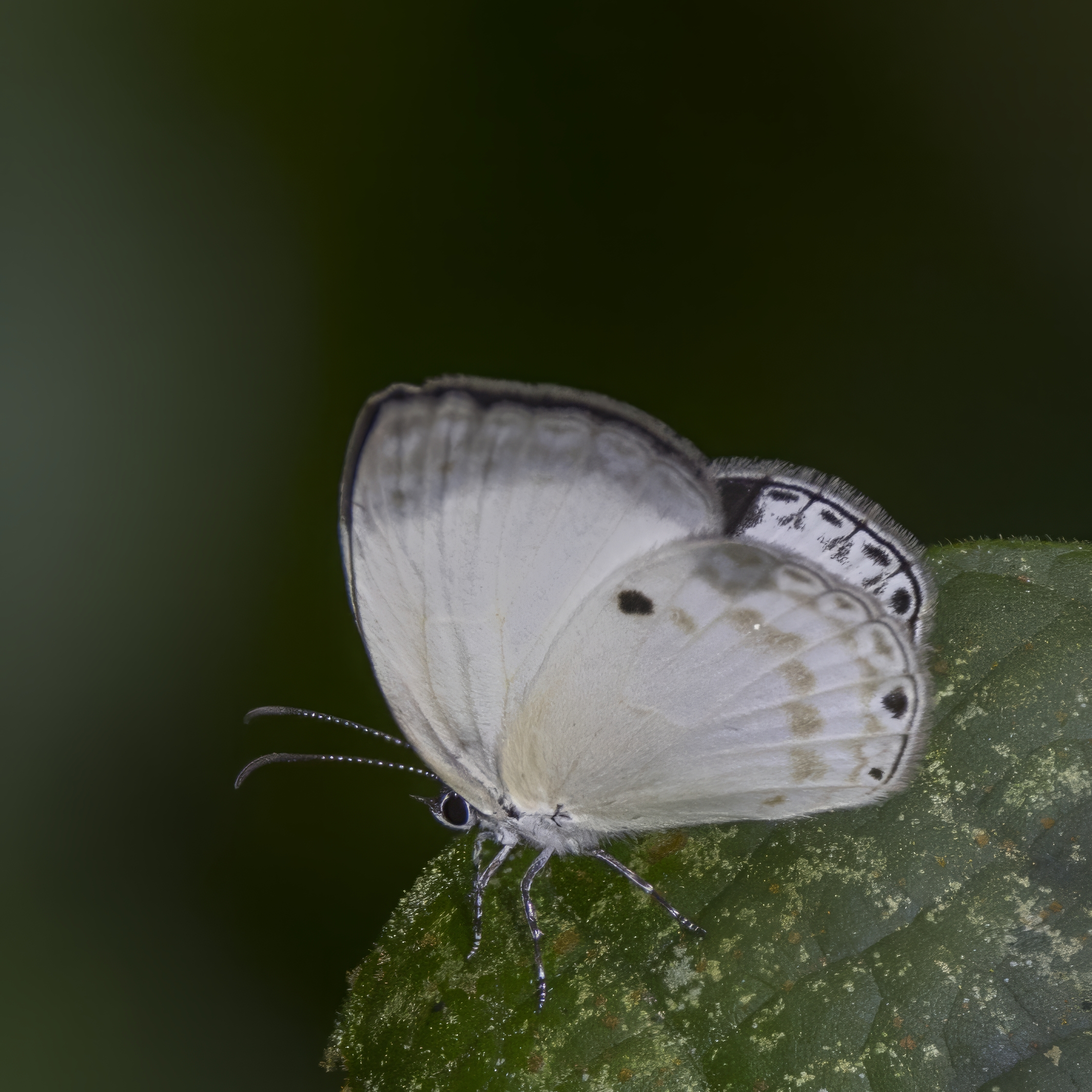
- O. o. ornata, Ghana

Scientific classification
- Kingdom: Animalia
- Phylum: Arthropoda
- Clade: Pancrustacea
- Class: Insecta
- Order: Lepidoptera
- Family: Lycaenidae
- Genus: Oboronia
- Species: O. ornata

Binomial name
- Oboronia ornata (Mabille, 1890)

Synonyms
- Lycaena ornata Mabille, 1890; Athysonota ornata; Liptena pseudosoyauxii Ehrmann, 1894; Oboronia ornata var. flava Holland, 1920; Athysonota ornata flava; Cupido (Oboronia) ornatus var. vestalis Aurivillius, 1895; Athysonota ornata vestalis

= Oboronia ornata =

Species of butterfly

Oboronia ornata, the untailed ginger white, is a butterfly in the family Lycaenidae. It is found in Guinea, Sierra Leone, Liberia, Ivory Coast, Ghana, Togo, Nigeria, Cameroon, Equatorial Guinea, Gabon, the Republic of the Congo, the Democratic Republic of the Congo, Uganda and Tanzania. The habitat consists of forests and Guinea savanna in riparian vegetation.

Both sexes are attracted to a small orange-flowered asteraceous plant without petals.

The larvae feed on Costus fissiligulatus and C. dubius.

== Subspecies ==
- Oboronia ornata ornata (Guinea, Sierra Leone, Liberia, Ivory Coast, Ghana, Togo, Nigeria: south and the Cross River loop, western Cameroon)
- Oboronia ornata flava Holland, 1920 (Equatorial Guinea)
- Oboronia ornata vestalis (Aurivillius, 1895) (Cameroon, Gabon, Congo, Democratic Republic of the Congo, Uganda, western Tanzania)

Torben Larsen developed a species numbering system for his 2005 publication Butterflies of West Africa. The nominate subspecies is #626. The 'Larsen' numbers have since been used with permission in A Sharp Eye on Butterflies of Ghana.
