= Titulus pictus =

Amphorae inscriptions

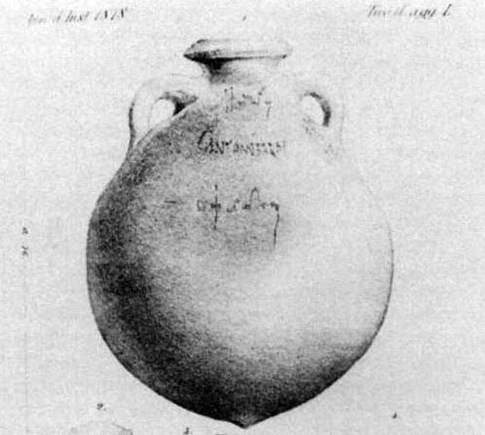
A Dressel 20 amphora with examples of tituli picti and potters' stamps found at Monte Testaccio

A titulus pictus is an ancient Roman commercial inscription made on the surface of certain artefacts, usually the neck of an amphora. Typically, these inscriptions were made in red or black paint. The inscription specifies information such as origin, destination, type of product, and owner. Tituli picti are frequent on ancient Roman pottery containers used for trade. They were not exclusively used for trade. They were also used to provide easily recognizable advertisements and may have served as insurance if a good was damaged in some way. There are around 2,500 tituli picti recorded in CIL IV (the volume of Latin inscriptions from Pompeii and Herculaneum).

The text of these inscriptions used a wide variety of abbreviations such as primum, excellens, optimum, flos, florum, praecellens, penuarium, and secundarium. It is possible that these epithets were used to convey the quality of the product. These abbreviations were organized into a style consisting of several elements. Numerals were used to indicate the age and weight of the contents and the weight of the container when empty. The measurement of the container's weight would be duplicated by another component of the titulus pictus in the genitive case. There was also a tria nomina indicating the buyer and the seller. The fifth element was the name of the owner.

The structure of the titulus pictus differed depending on its usage. The most intricate tituli were for Spanish oil amphorae. Usually, these tituli were painted in black, and indicated the amphora's weight, contents, producer, and owner's name in the genitive case. Wine Tituli from Crete were written in Greek, Latin, or both. These inscriptions informed the reader of the qualities of the wine, the volume of the container, the date, the origin, and the owner (whose name was written in red and the dative case). The colors of the tituli conveyed information about its source. For example, white tituli were used to refer to producers. Red ones meant that the producer was a local producer. Black tituli meant the owners were wholesale traders. Different grammatical cases had different meanings when used in the titulus pictus. The dative case was used to show the recipient or buyer of the good. The genitive case was used to identify the producer and owner of the product. The ablative case was used to identify the consignor of the goods. The nominative case was used to identify the consumer or wholesaler.

A container found in Tunisia has a titulus pictus dated between the 4th century and 6th centuries that reads:

Container of wine, Mary begets Christ, 22 units of wine.

One Cretan titulus pictus found in Capua reads:

wine which is owed to Campania, amphora 472

== See also ==
- Merchant's mark
- Monte Testaccio: Tituli picti
- History of marketing
- Titulus (inscription)
