= GBLA =

GBLA or variation, may refer to:

== People ==
- Abass Gbla, cricket player representing Sierra Leone at 2010 ICC World Cricket League Africa Region Division Two
- Khadija Gbla, human rights activist from Sierra Leone

== Groups and organizations ==
- The Great Bitter Lake Association, the association of ships' crews of the Yellow Fleet
- Gilgit-Baltistan Legislative Assembly, unicameral legislature for Gilgit-Baltistan, Pakistan

== Other uses ==
- Gelora Bandung Lautan Api Stadium, Gedebage, Bandung, West Java, Indonesia; a soccer stadium

== See also ==
- Gramm–Leach–Bliley Act (GLBA; Financial Services Modernization Act of 1999) U.S. federal law
- Gabla (disambiguation)
