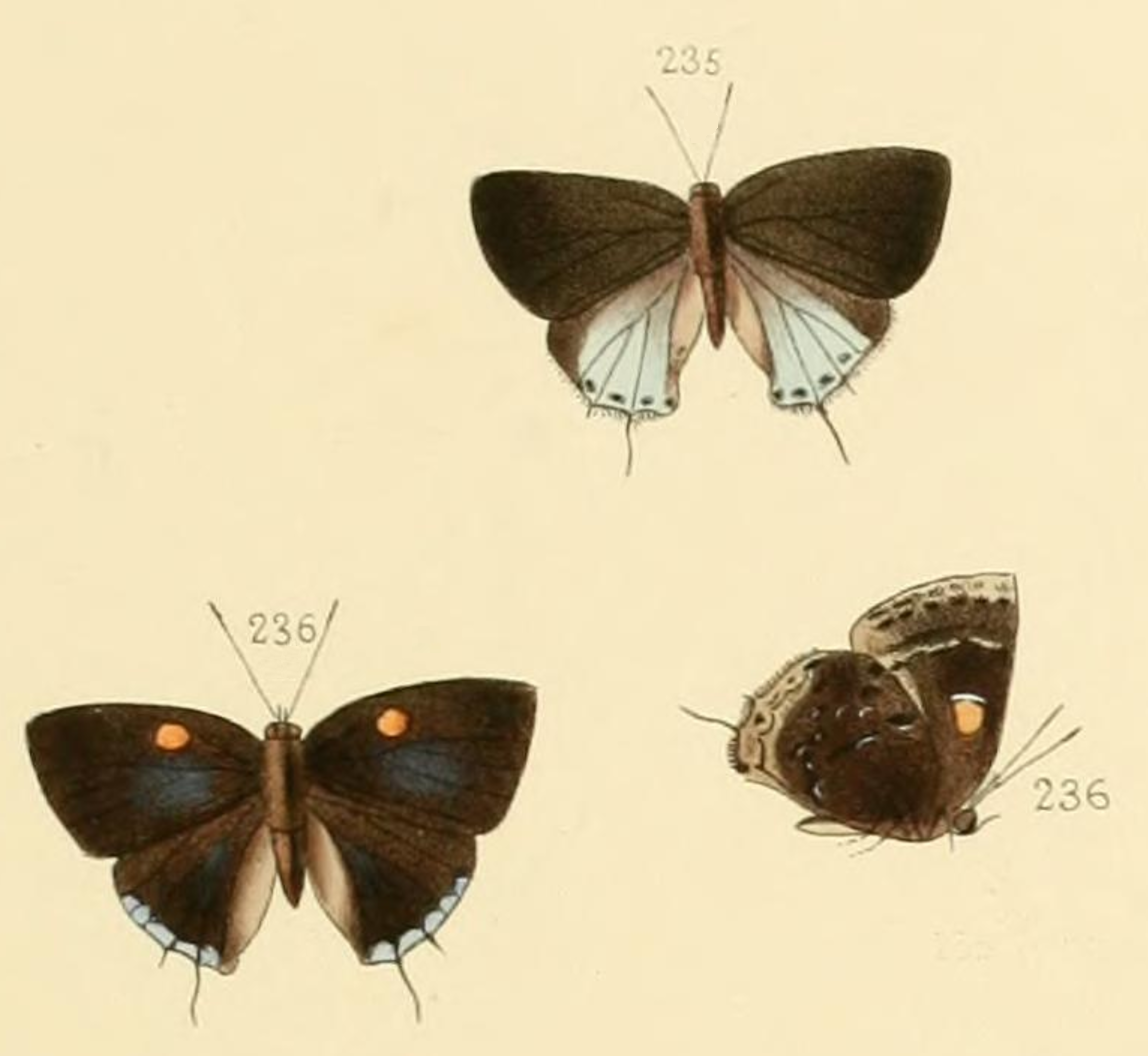
- O. ocrisia ♀ 235, ♂ 236.

Scientific classification
- Kingdom: Animalia
- Phylum: Arthropoda
- Class: Insecta
- Order: Lepidoptera
- Superfamily: Papilionoidea
- Family: Lycaenidae
- Genus: Ocaria
- Species: O. ocrisia

Binomial name
- Ocaria ocrisia (Hewitson, 1868)

Synonyms
- Thecla ocrisia Hewitson, 1868; Thecla zora Hewitson, 1869; Thecla peruviana Erschoff, 1876; Thecla ocrisia lita Hayward, 1949

= Ocaria ocrisia =

Species of butterfly

Ocaria ocrisia, the black hairstreak or Hewitson's blackstreak, is a butterfly of the family Lycaenidae. It was described by William Chapman Hewitson in 1868. It is found from Mexico to Brazil, Paraguay, Peru, Ecuador and Argentina. It has also been recorded in southern Arizona. The habitat consists of rainforests at altitudes ranging from 200 to 900 meters.

The wingspan is about 27 mm.
