= Horreum =

Public warehouse used during the ancient Roman period

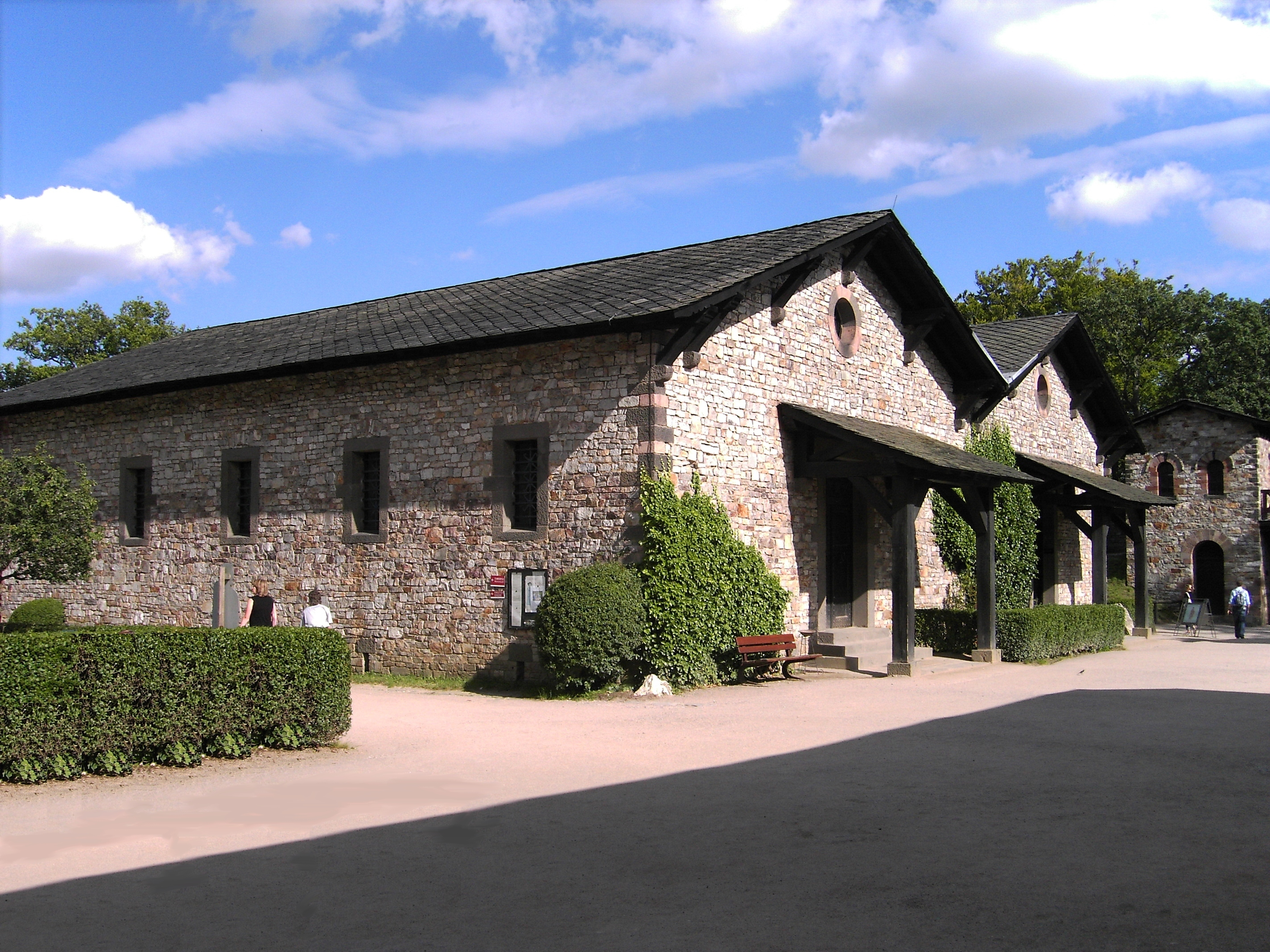
Reconstructed horreum at the Saalburg fort in Germany

A horreum (plural: horrea) was a type of public warehouse used during the ancient Roman period. Although the Latin term is often used to refer to granaries. By the end of the imperial period, the city of Rome had nearly 300 horrea to supply its demands. The biggest were enormous, even by modern standards; the Horrea Galbae contained 140 rooms on the ground floor alone, covering an area of some 225,000 square feet (21,000 m^{2}). They provided storage for not only the annona publica (public grain supply) but also a great variety of resources like olive oil and foodstuffs. The amount of storage space available in the public horrea can be judged by the fact that when the emperor Septimius Severus died in 211 AD, he is said to have left the city's horrea stocked with enough food to supply Rome's million-strong population for seven years. Smaller (though similar) horrea were a standard feature of Roman towns, cities and forts throughout the empire; well-preserved examples of military horrea have been excavated on Hadrian's Wall in England, notably at the forts of Housesteads, Corbridge and South Shields.

== History ==
Horreum ruins at Housesteads Roman Fort

The first horrea were built in Rome towards the end of the 2nd century BC, with the first known public horreum being constructed by the ill-fated tribune Gaius Gracchus in 123 BC. The word came to be applied any place designated for the preservation of goods; thus it was often used to refer to cellars (horrea subterranea), but it could also be applied to a place where artworks were stored, or even to a library. Some public horrea functioned somewhat like banks, where valuables could be stored, but the most important class of horrea were those where foodstuffs such as grain and olive oil were stored and distributed by the state. Rome's insatiable demands for foodstuffs meant that the amount of goods that passed through some of the city's horrea was immense, even by modern standards. The artificial hill of Monte Testaccio in Rome, which stands behind the site of the Horrea Galbae, is estimated to contain the remains of at least 53 million olive oil amphorae in which some 6 billion litres (1.58 billion gallons) of oil were imported.

== Design and naming ==
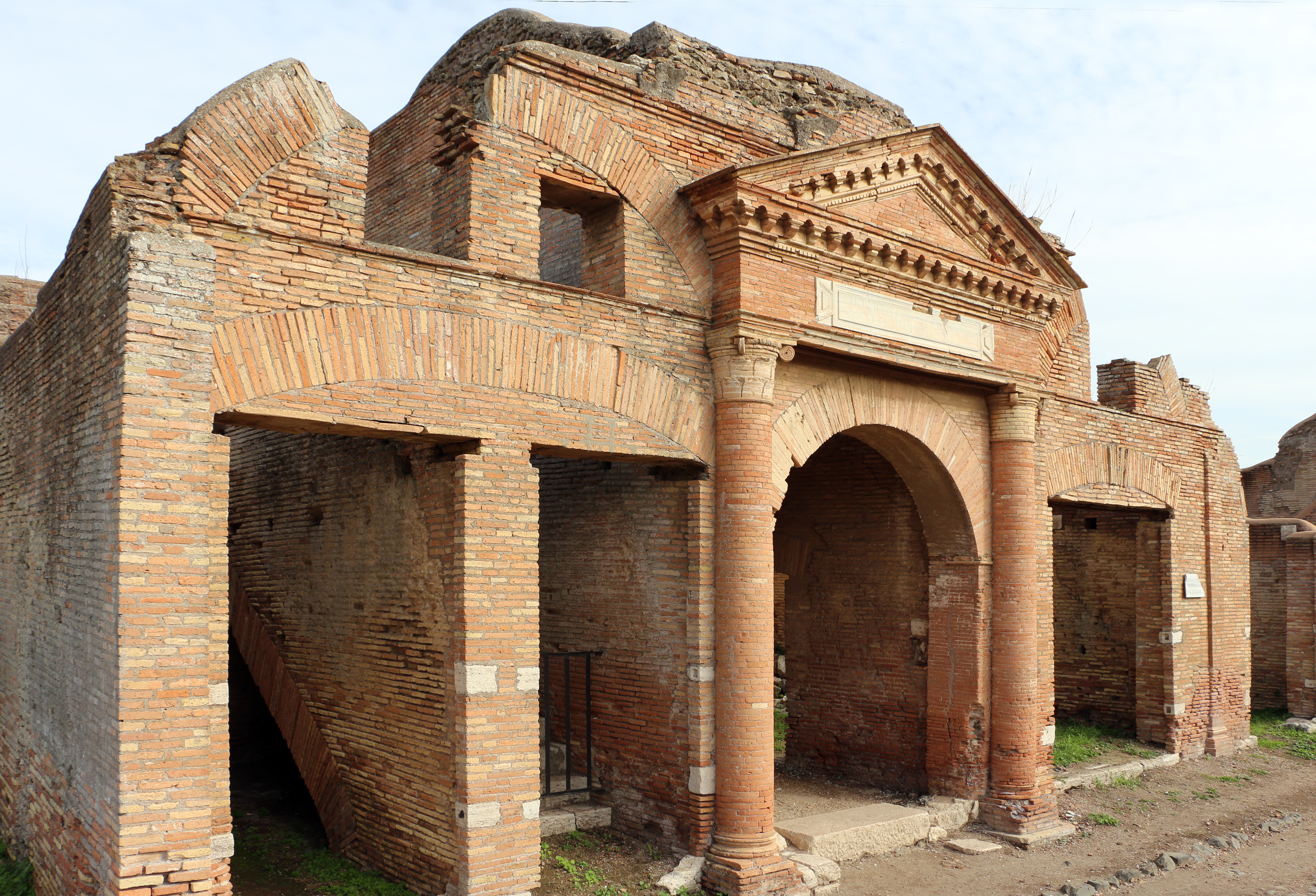
The Horrea Epagathiana et Epaphroditiana, a horreum in Ostia built c. 145–150 AD

The horrea of Rome and its port, Ostia, stood two or more stories high. They were built with ramps, rather than staircases, to provide easy access to the upper floors. Grain horrea had their ground floor raised on pillars to reduce the likelihood of damp getting in and spoiling the goods.

Many horrea appear to have served as great trading areas with rows of small shops (tabernae) off a central courtyard; some may have been fairly elaborate, perhaps serving as the equivalent of modern shopping arcades. Others, such as those in Ostia, dispensed with the courtyard and instead had rows of tabernae standing back-to-back. In the Middle East, horrea took a very different design with a single row of very deep tabernae, all opening onto the same side; this reflected an architectural style that was widely followed in the region's palaces and temple complexes, well before the arrival of the Romans.

Unsurprisingly, security and fire protection were major concerns. Horrea were frequently built with very thick walls (as much as 1 metre (3 ft) thick) to reduce the danger of fire, and the windows were always narrow and placed high up on the wall to deter theft. Doors were protected with elaborate systems of locks and bolts. Even the largest horrea usually only had two or three external doors, which were often quite narrow and would not have permitted the entrance of carts. The arduous task of moving goods into, out of and around horrea was most probably carried out by manual labour alone; the biggest horrea would thus have had an enormous staff of labourers.

Roman horrea were individually named, some having names indicating the commodities they stored (and probably sold), such as wax (candelaria), paper (chartaria) and pepper (piperataria). Others were named after emperors or other individuals connected with the imperial family, such as the aforementioned Horrea Galbae, which were apparently named after the 1st century AD emperor Galba. A particularly well-preserved horreum in Ostia, the Horrea Epagathiana et Epaphroditiana, is known from an inscription to have been named after two freedmen (presumably its owners), Epagathus and Epaphroditus.

== Bibliography ==
- RICKMAN, G., (1971): Roman Granaries and store buildings. Cambridge.
- SALIDO DOMINGUEZ, J., (2011): Horrea Militaria. El aprovisionamiento de grano al ejército en el occidente del Imperio romano, Anejos de Gladius 14, Madrid.
- SALIDO DOMINGUEZ, J., (2009): “Los graneros militares romanos de Hispania”. En MORILLO, A., HANEL, N. & MARTÍN, E., (eds.): Limes XX. Estudios sobre la Frontera Romana. Anejos de Gladius 13. Volumen 2. Madrid, 679-692. I.S.B.N. 978-84-00-08856-9.
- SALIDO DOMINGUEZ, J., (2008): “La investigación sobre los horrea de época romana: balance historiográfico y perspectivas de futuro”. CUPAUAM 34, 105-124. I.S.B.N. 978-84-00-08856-9 https://www.uam.es/otros/cupauam/pdf/Cupauam34/3405.pdf
- SALIDO DOMINGUEZ, J., (2008b): “Los sistemas de almacenamiento y conservación de grano en las villae hispanorromanas”. En FERNÁNDEZ OCHOA, C., GARCÍA-ENTERO, V. & GIL SENDINO, F., (eds.): Las villae tardorromanas en el Occidente del Imperio. Arquitectura y función. IV Coloquio Internacional de Arqueología de Gijón. 26, 27 y 28 de Octubre de 2006, Gijón, 693-706. I.S.B.N.: 978-84-9704-363-2.
