= Horrea Galbae =

- Location within Rome
- 41°52′46″N 12°28′31″E
- Type: Horreum
- Location: Regione XIII Aventinus

History
- Built: 1st century BC (?)
- Built by: Sulpicii Galbae?

The Horrea Galbae were warehouses (horrea) in the southern part of ancient Rome, located between the southern end of the Aventine Hill and the waste dump of Monte Testaccio. They ran for a substantial distance, possibly extending as far as the Porta Ostiensis in the east and the Porticus Aemilia on the banks of the Tiber. The horrea were most likely built on the site of a suburban villa owned by the Sulpicii Galbae, a distinguished noble family of whom the 1st century AD Roman Emperor Galba was a member. (There are many alternative spellings of the name: Galbana, Galbiana, Galbes and so on.)

The tomb of Servius Sulpicius Galba (probably the consul of 108 BC, rather than his better-known father of the same name) stood in front of the warehouse complex. It is not clear when the horrea were founded, but presumably it was some time after the tomb was built. The complex was probably originally known as the Horrea Sulpicia, after the nomen of the gens Sulpicia, but acquired its later name during the time of the emperor Galba.

Archaeological excavations and the remains of the Forma Urbis Romae show that the Horrea Galbae comprised three long rectangular courtyards set out in parallel, each surrounded by colonnades or arcades of tabernae, with a single entrance positioned on the axis at a short end. They were used to store the annona publica (the public grain supply) as well as olive oil, wine, foodstuffs, clothing and even marble. The size of the Horrea Galbae was enormous, even by modern standards; the horrea contained 140 rooms on the ground floor alone, covering an area of some 225,000 square feet (21,000 m^{2}).

It is thought that Monte Testaccio, the giant mound of broken amphorae that lay behind the Horrea Galbae, was associated with the complex. Olive oil imported from far-away Baetica (in modern Spain) was emptied into bulk containers, probably in the horrea, and the original import vessels were smashed and dumped on Monte Testaccio. The scale of the imports can be judged by the fact that Monte Testaccio is estimated to contain the remains of at least 53 million olive oil amphorae, in which some 6 billion litres (1.58 billion gallons) of oil were imported.

Little now remains of the Horrea Galbae. Walls and brickwork, dating probably from the 1st century AD, have been discovered by archaeologists along with large lead pipes bearing inscriptions from Hadrian's reign in the following century.
