= Baths of Licinius Sura =

The Baths of Licinius Sura or Thermae Suranae were a private ancient Roman bath complex built by Lucius Licinius Sura on the Aventine Hill (Regio XIII Aventinus) in Rome.

They were restored during the short reign of Gordian III. The baths were damaged during the 410 sack of Rome by Alaric I, and again restored in 414. The baths probably served a more affluent community than the Baths of Caracalla, and were smaller and probably more elegant.

Although now no ruins remain, their approximate location was: 41.88297°N 12.48315°E, and they are partially shown on slab VII-14 of the Forma Urbis Romae, numbered as fragment 21a by E. Rodríguez Almeida.

Their location must have been in the immediate vicinity to the west of the church of Santa Prisca, near the Temple of Diana, with the arches of the Aqua Marcia which fed them, passing right along the site of the current church. On the Forma Urbis, to the north of the baths there is also a temple of uncertain identification, perhaps the Temple of Luna or the Temple of Vertumnus, both of which were republican.

== See also ==
- List of ancient monuments in Rome
