= Oboronia guessfeldti =

Scientific classification
- Kingdom: Animalia
- Phylum: Arthropoda
- Clade: Pancrustacea
- Class: Insecta
- Order: Lepidoptera
- Family: Lycaenidae
- Genus: Oboronia
- Species: O. guessfeldti

Binomial name
- Oboronia guessfeldti (Dewitz, 1879)

Synonyms
- Plebeius güssfeldti Dewitz, 1879

Species of butterfly

Oboronia guessfeldti, the Güssfeldt's blue or Güssfeldt's ginger white, is a butterfly in the family Lycaenidae. It is found in Senegal, Guinea-Bissau, Guinea, Sierra Leone, Liberia, Ivory Coast, Ghana, Togo, Nigeria (south and the Cross River loop), Cameroon, the Republic of the Congo, the Central African Republic, Angola, the Democratic Republic of the Congo (Uele, Tshopo, Equateur, Sankuru and Lualaba), Uganda, western Kenya and northern Zambia. The habitat consists of drier forests, Guinea savanna and rarely also wet forests.

Both sexes are attracted to flowers.

The larvae feed on Costus (including Costus dewiveri) and possibly Zingiber species.

Torben Larsen developed a species numbering system for his 2005 publication Butterflies of West Africa. This species is #625. The 'Larsen' numbers have since been used with permission in A Sharp Eye on Butterflies of Ghana.
