= Oboronia pseudopunctatus =

Scientific classification
- Kingdom: Animalia
- Phylum: Arthropoda
- Clade: Pancrustacea
- Class: Insecta
- Order: Lepidoptera
- Family: Lycaenidae
- Genus: Oboronia
- Species: O. pseudopunctatus

Binomial name
- Oboronia pseudopunctatus (Strand, 1912)

Synonyms
- Cupido (Oboronia) pseudopunctatus Strand, 1912; Oboronia arctimargo Hulstaert, 1924

Species of butterfly

Oboronia pseudopunctatus, the light ginger white, is a butterfly in the family Lycaenidae. It is found in Ghana (the Volta region), Togo, Nigeria (south and the Cross River loop), Cameroon, Bioko, Gabon, the Republic of the Congo, Angola, the Democratic Republic of the Congo (Equateur, Tshuapa, Mongala, Uele, Sankuru and Lualaba), Uganda (from the western part of the country to Bwamba) and north-western Tanzania. The habitat consists of forests.

The larvae feed on Costus species, including C. afer.

In Seitz it is described - Very similar to the preceding (Oboronia punctatus), but distinguished by the costal area of the forewing being in the centre not at all and at the base only very slightly dusted dark; the marginal band of the hindwing is only about 1.2 mm broad, and only at its anterior end, where it is slightly broader (about 1,8 mm), black, otherwise dark grey; on the hindwing beneath the black costal spot is just as large as the marginal spot; near the centre of the proximal margin of the hindwing there is a black punctiform spot; forewing beneath without a postmedian row of grey dots; the marginal spots of both wings appear as blurred transverse streaks at most. Expanse of wings: 33 mm. Cameroon.
