= Oboronia liberiana =

Scientific classification
- Kingdom: Animalia
- Phylum: Arthropoda
- Clade: Pancrustacea
- Class: Insecta
- Order: Lepidoptera
- Family: Lycaenidae
- Genus: Oboronia
- Species: O. liberiana

Binomial name
- Oboronia liberiana Stempffer, 1950

Species of butterfly

Oboronia liberiana, the Liberian ginger white, is a butterfly in the family Lycaenidae. It is found in Liberia, Ivory Coast and Ghana. The habitat consists of wetter forests.

Adults are attracted to the flowers of the larval host plant.

The larvae feed on Costus afer.

Torben Larsen developed a species numbering system for his 2005 publication Butterflies of West Africa. This species is #623. The 'Larsen' numbers have since been used with permission in A Sharp Eye on Butterflies of Ghana.
