= Oboronia bueronica =

Scientific classification
- Domain: Eukaryota
- Kingdom: Animalia
- Phylum: Arthropoda
- Class: Insecta
- Order: Lepidoptera
- Family: Lycaenidae
- Genus: Oboronia
- Species: O. bueronica

Binomial name
- Oboronia bueronica Karsch, 1895

Species of butterfly

Oboronia bueronica, the ginger blue, is a butterfly in the family Lycaenidae. It is found along the southern coast of Kenya and in north-eastern Tanzania, Malawi, Mozambique and Zimbabwe. The habitat consists of dense forests.

Both sexes are attracted to flowers.

The larvae feed on Costus species. They are associated with very small unidentified dark brown ants.
