= Gabla =

Gabla may refer to:

- Ǧabla (Arabic:جبلة), a city in Syria, also known as Jableh
- Uí Gabla (clan), an Irish clan and surname, see List of Irish clans
- Gabla, the Mauritanian Arabic dialect, see Hassaniya Arabic
- Gabla, a content creator and gamer known for his work in Fortnite and other video games, active under the name Gabla since March 12, 2018 (YouTube Channel).

== See also ==
- GBLA (disambiguation)
- Galba (disambiguation)
