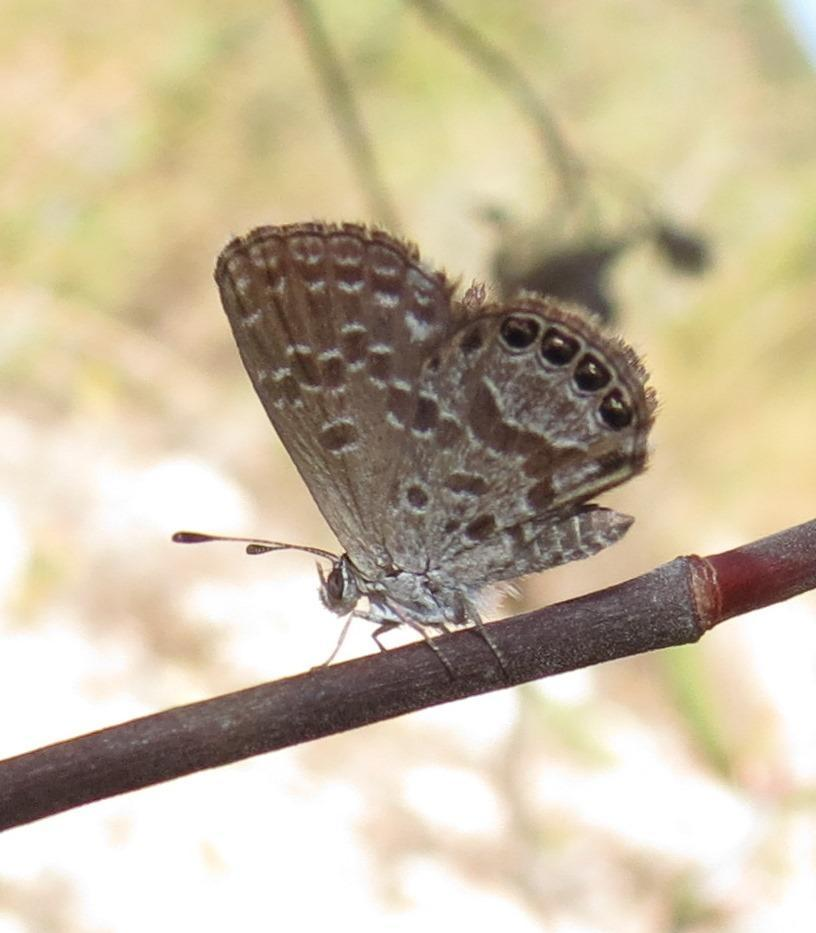

Scientific classification
- Kingdom: Animalia
- Phylum: Arthropoda
- Class: Insecta
- Order: Lepidoptera
- Family: Lycaenidae
- Genus: Oraidium
- Species: O. barberae

Binomial name
- Oraidium barberae (Trimen, 1868)

Synonyms
- Lycaena barberae Trimen, 1868; Brephidium barberae

= Oraidium barberae =

Species of butterfly

Oraidium barberae, the dwarf blue, is a butterfly of the family Lycaenidae. It is found in South Africa and Zimbabwe. In South Africa it is found from the Western Cape, north to Namaqualand, the Northern Cape and east to the Eastern Cape and the Free State as well as northern KwaZulu-Natal.

The wingspan is 10–15 mm for males and 12–18 mm for females, the smallest of all known butterflies. Adults are on wing continuously depending on the rainfall, with peaks usually occurring from September to November and from February to April.

The larvae probably feed on Exomis axyrioides.
