= Castra Galbae =

Castra Galbae was an ancient city and diocese in Africa Proconsulare. It is now a Roman Catholic titular see.

== History ==
Castra Galbae, apparently named after a member of the Galba family (including an ephemerous general-emperor), was among the towns, important enough in the Roman province of Numidia (in the papal sway) to become a suffragan diocese.

Its only historically documented bishop, Lucius, took part in the Council of Carthage called in 256 by Saint Cyprian, bishop of Carthage), concerning the lapsi, 'fallen' Christians who accepted forced pagan sacrifices to avoid martyrdom.

The bishopric faded, plausibly during the 7th century advent of Islam, but the town persisted in modern Algeria, under the Arabic equivalent of its ancient name: Kasr-Galaba (kasr also meaning fortified place).

== Titular see ==
The diocese was nominally restored in 1933 as titular bishopric of Castra Galbæ (Latin) / Castra di Galba (Curiate Italian) / Castrensis Galbæ (Latin adjective).

It has had the following incumbents, so far of the fitting Episcopal (lowest) rank, including one of Byzantine Rite:

- Paul-Sanson-Jean-Marie Robert (born France) (1966.08.18 – death 1994.03.04) as emeritate; formerly Bishop of Les Gonaïves (Haiti) (1936.01.14 – 1966.08.18)
- László Bíró (1994.04.18 – 2008.11.20) as Auxiliary Bishop of Archdiocese of Kalocsa–Kecskemet (Hungary) (1994.04.18 – 2008.11.20); later Military Ordinary of Hungary (Hungary) (2008.11.20 – ...)
- Sviatoslav Shevchuk (born Ukraine) (2009.01.14 – 2011.03.23) as Ukrainian Catholic Auxiliary Bishop of Santa María del Patrocinio en Buenos Aires of the Ukrainians (Argentina) (2009.01.14 – 2010.03.10); next remaining a while Apostolic Administrator of Santa María del Patrocinio en Buenos Aires of the Ukrainians (Argentina) (2010.03.10 – 2011.03.23), then Major Archbishop of Kyiv–Halyč of the Ukrainians (Ukraine) ([2011.03.23] 2011.03.25 – ...), President of Synod of the Ukrainian Catholic Church (2011.03.25 – ...)
- Edgar Aristizábal Quintero (2011.05.04 – 2017.05.04) as Auxiliary Bishop of Archdiocese of Medellin (Colombia) (2011.05.04 – 2017.05.04); next Bishop of Yopal (Colombia) (2017.05.04 – ...)
- Josef Nuzík (2017.07.05 – ...), Archbishop of Archdiocese of Olomouc (Moravia, Czechia) (2017.07.05 – ...).

== See also ==
- List of Catholic dioceses in Algeria

== Sources and external links ==
- GCatholic

Bibliography

- Pius Bonifacius Gams, Series episcoporum Ecclesiae Catholicae, Leipzig 1931, p. 465
- Stefano Antonio Morcelli, Africa christiana, Volume I, Brescia 1816, p. 130
