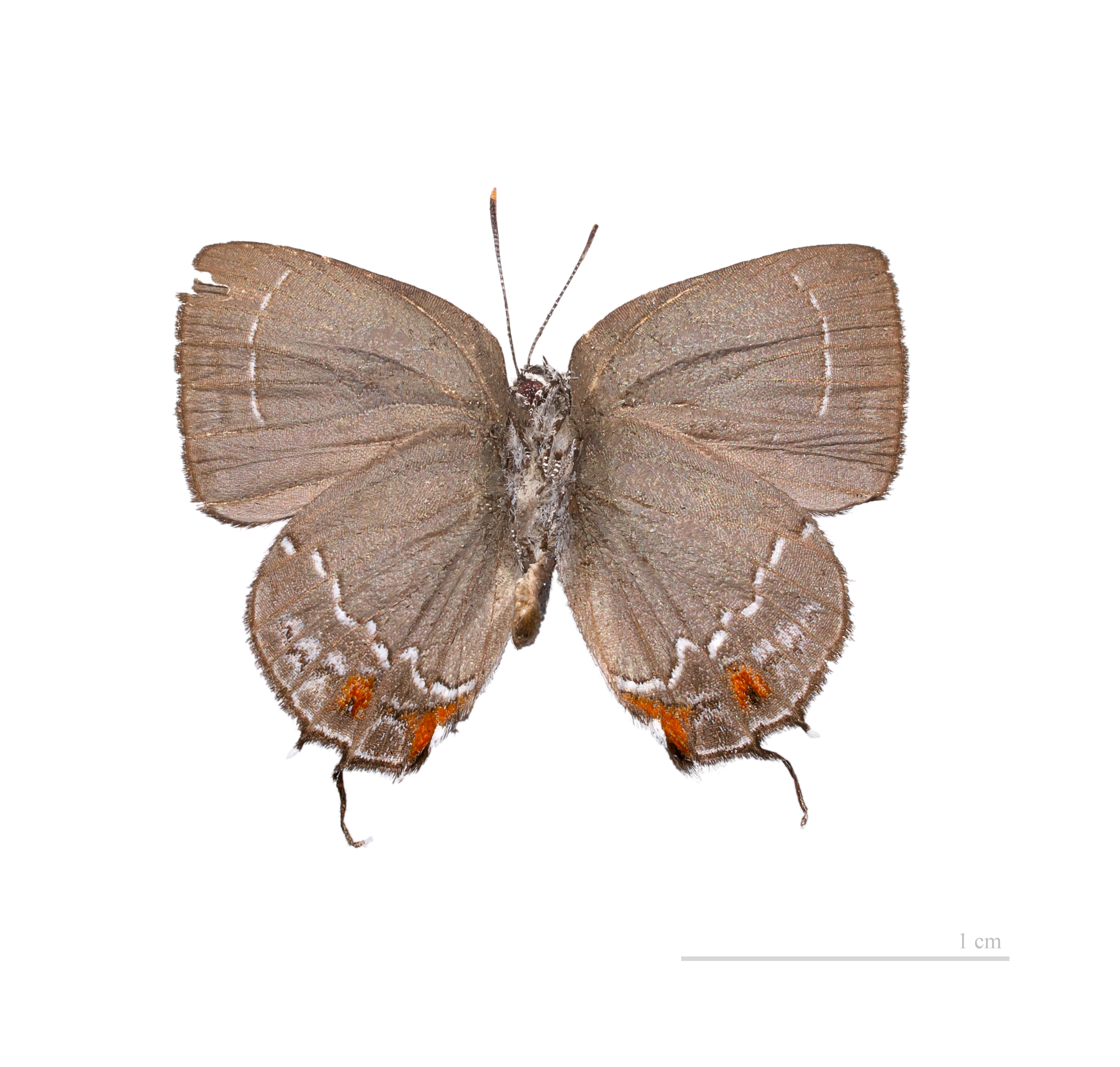
- Ventral side

Scientific classification
- Domain: Eukaryota
- Kingdom: Animalia
- Phylum: Arthropoda
- Class: Insecta
- Order: Lepidoptera
- Family: Lycaenidae
- Genus: Ostrinotes
- Species: O. tarena

Binomial name
- Ostrinotes tarena (Hewitson, 1874)

Synonyms
- Thecla tarena Hewitson, 1874; Thecla ostrinus Druce, 1907

= Ostrinotes tarena =

- Dorsal side

Species of butterfly

Ostrinotes tarena is a species of butterfly, described by William Chapman Hewitson in 1874, belonging to the family Lycaenidae. It is found in French Guiana and Guyana.
