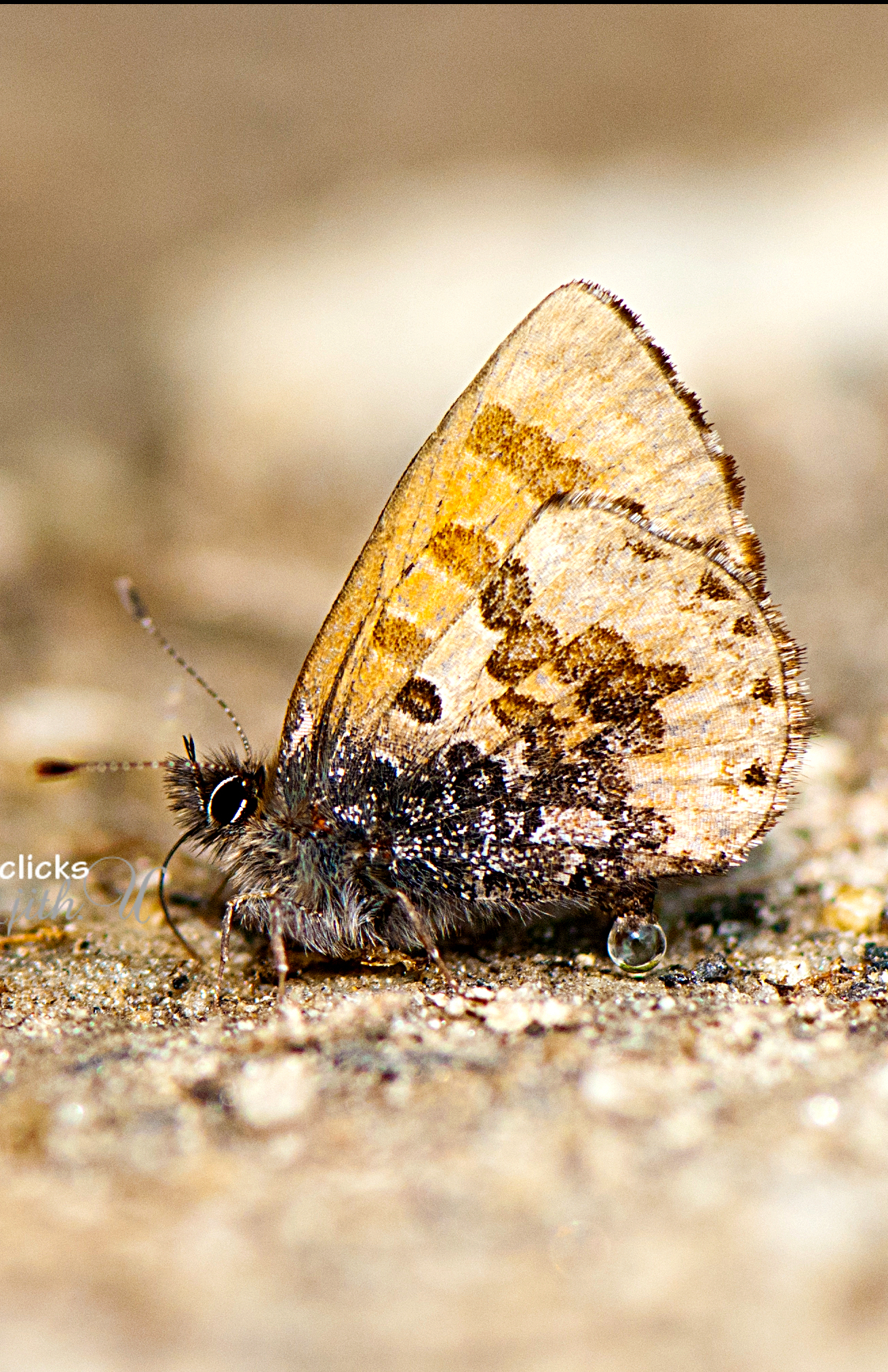
- In Eaglenest WLS, Arunachal Pradesh, India

Scientific classification
- Domain: Eukaryota
- Kingdom: Animalia
- Phylum: Arthropoda
- Class: Insecta
- Order: Lepidoptera
- Family: Lycaenidae
- Genus: Orthomiella
- Species: O. pontis

Binomial name
- Orthomiella pontis (Butler, 1884)

= Orthomiella pontis =

Straightwing blue

Species of butterfly

Orthomiella pontis, the straightwing blue, is a small butterfly found in India that belongs to the lycaenids or blues family.

== Description ==
Male upperside: deep purplish brown, the purple suffusion visible in some lights, not in others. Forewings and hindwings: uniform, with dark brown, somewhat broad anteciliary lines. Cilia brown alternated with white. Underside: paler, somewhat silky brown. Forewing: base thickly irrorated (sprinkled) with black scales; cell transversely crossed in the middle and along the discocellulars by brown bars of a darker shade than the ground colour of the wing; a transverse, somewhat irregular, catenulated (chain-like), ducal, similarly coloured band followed by a slightly paler, transverse, narrow, lunular, subterminal broad line, beyond which the ground colour is earthy brown, with a superposed terminal series of lunate spots in the interspaces. The cellular and discal markings are faintly edged with white, the terminal markings are generally very obscure. Hindwing: base, posterior half of cell and bases of interspaces 1a, 1, 2 and 3 densely irrorated with black scales with irregular small patches of paler scales superposed thereon; a transverse, catenulated, subbasal dark brown band, a similar shorter band from costa across the discocellulars and a similar very irregular discal band from costa, all merged posteriorly into the irroration of black scales, followed as on the forewing by an obscure, transverse, lunular, subterminal brown line, and a terminal row of ill-defined, similarly coloured, lunate spots. Antenna dark brown, the shafts speckled with white; head, thorax and abdomen deep purplish brown; beneath: palpi, thorax and abdomen fuscous black.

Female upperside: dark brown. Forewing: basal two-thirds brilliant purplish blue, much brighter than the purple sheen in the male. Hindwing: a medial area from base extended outwards for about two-thirds the length of the wing, purplish blue as on the forewing. This colour not extended anteriorly to the costa or posteriorly to the dorsum. Cilia of both forewings and hindwings as in the male. Underside: ground colour and markings similar to those of the male, but the latter somewhat more clearly and neatly defined; on the hindwing the irroration of black scales at base and on the posterior half of the wing less extensive. Antennae, head, thorax and abdomen as in the male.

== See also ==
- List of butterflies of India (Lycaenidae)
