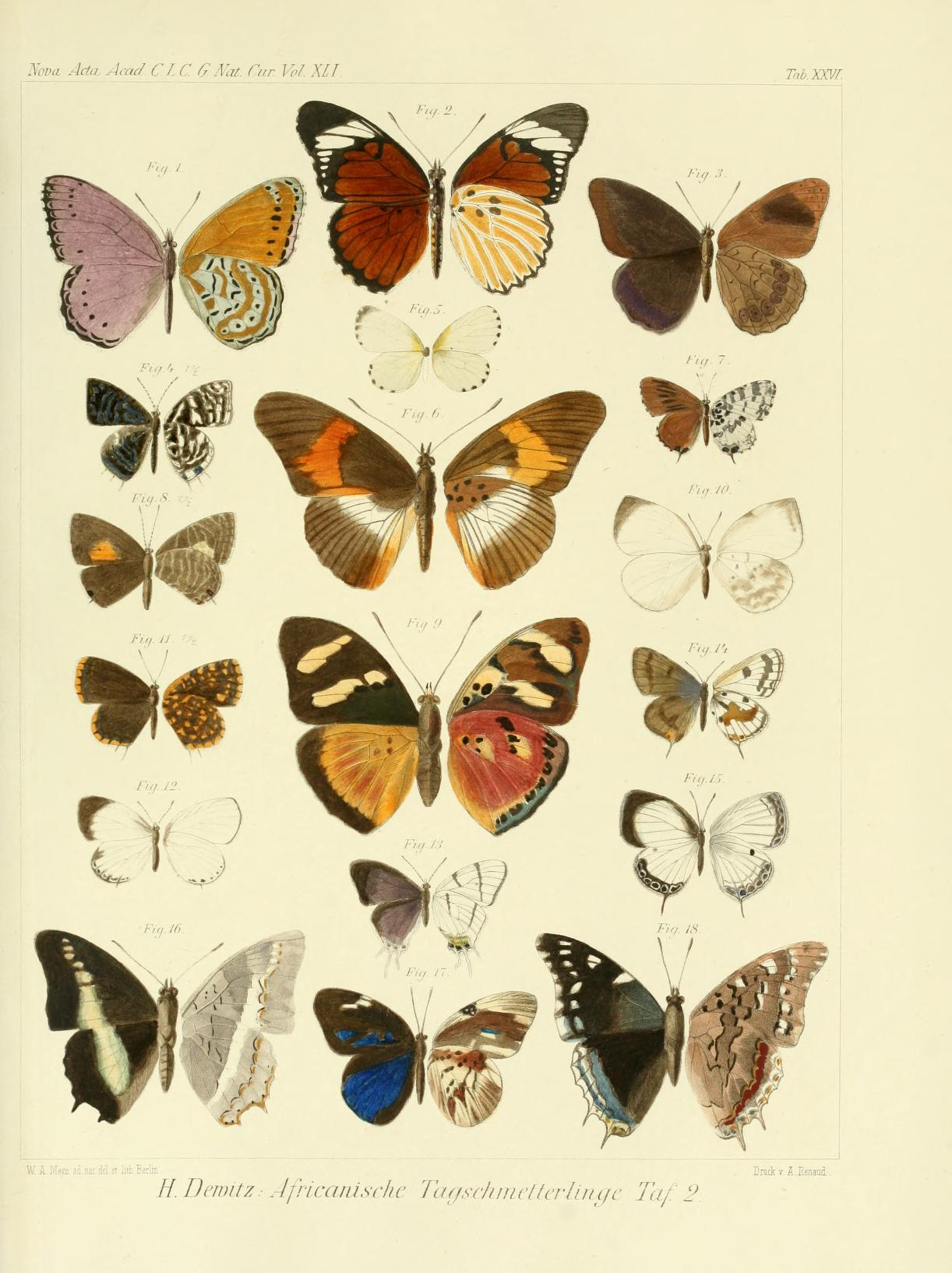
- Figure 12 Plebeius güssfeldti Dewitz, 1879 synonym for Oboronia guessfeldti

Scientific classification
- Domain: Eukaryota
- Kingdom: Animalia
- Phylum: Arthropoda
- Class: Insecta
- Order: Lepidoptera
- Family: Lycaenidae
- Subfamily: Polyommatinae
- Tribe: Polyommatini
- Genus: Oboronia; Karsch, 1893

Synonyms
- Athysanota Karsch, 1895

= Oboronia =

Butterfly genus in family Lycaenidae

Oboronia is an Afrotropical genus of butterfly in the family Lycaenidae.

== Species ==
- Oboronia albicosta (Gaede, 1916)
- Oboronia bueronica Karsch, 1895
- Oboronia guessfeldti (Dewitz, 1879)
- Oboronia liberiana Stempffer, 1950
- Oboronia ornata (Mabille, 1890)
- Oboronia pseudopunctatus (Strand, 1912)
- Oboronia punctatus (Dewitz, 1879)
