= Orcya =

Scientific classification
- Domain: Eukaryota
- Kingdom: Animalia
- Phylum: Arthropoda
- Class: Insecta
- Order: Lepidoptera
- Family: Lycaenidae
- Genus: Orcya; Johnson, 1990

Butterfly genus in family Lycaenidae

Orcya is a genus of butterflies in the family Lycaenidae.
