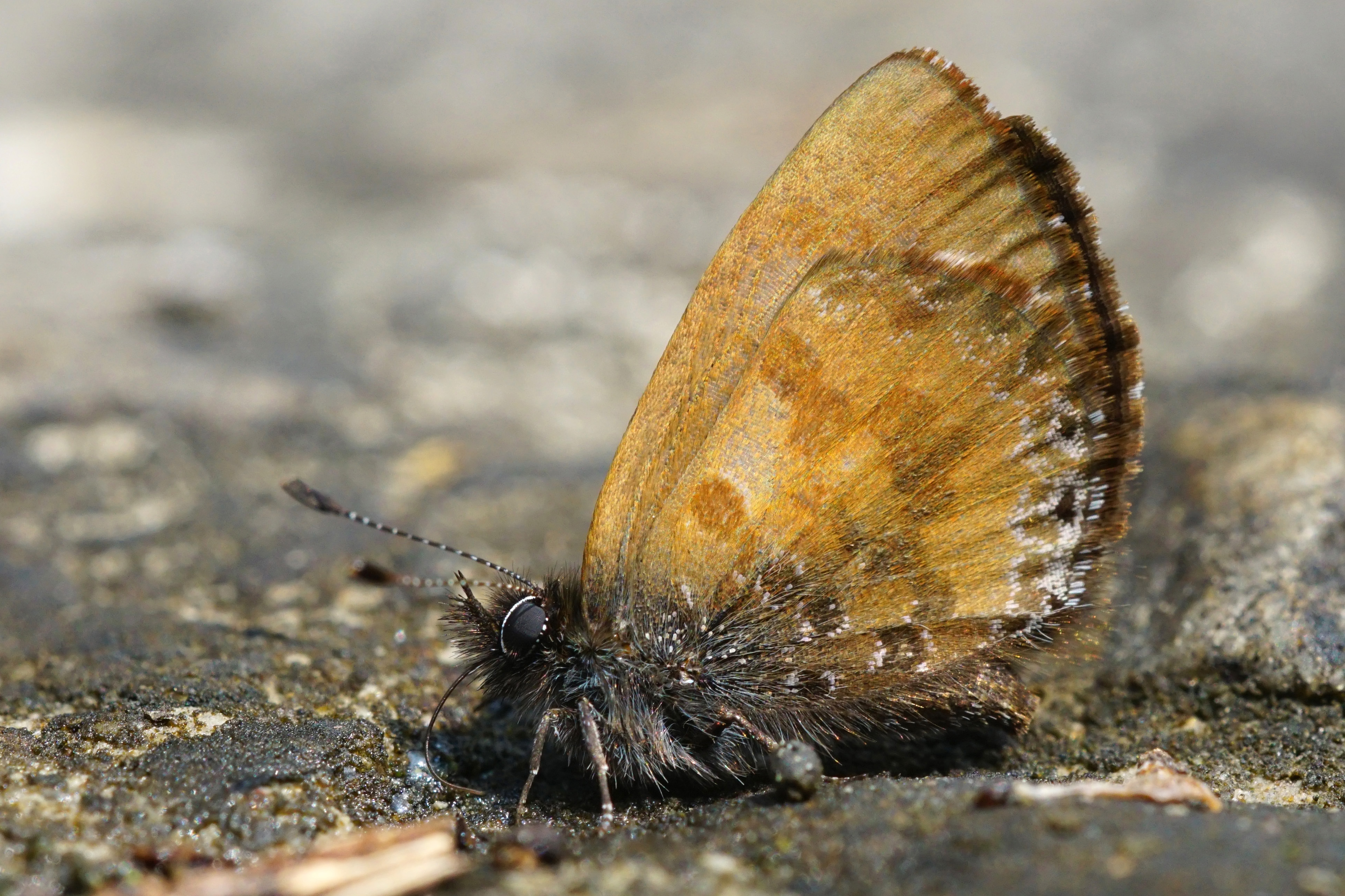
- Orthomiella rantaizana

Scientific classification
- Kingdom: Animalia
- Phylum: Arthropoda
- Clade: Pancrustacea
- Class: Insecta
- Order: Lepidoptera
- Family: Lycaenidae
- Subfamily: Polyommatinae
- Tribe: Polyommatini
- Genus: Orthomiella de Nicéville, 1890

= Orthomiella =

Butterfly genus in family Lycaenidae

Orthomiella is a genus of butterflies in the family Lycaenidae. The species of this genus are found in the Indomalayan realm and Yunnan in the Palearctic realm.

== Species ==
- Orthomiella pontis
- Orthomiella rantaizana Wileman, 1910 Taiwan, Thailand, Burma, Laos, Vietnam
- Orthomiella sinensis (Elwes, 1887) China, Burma
