= Galba (automobile) =

- Founded: 1929
- Defunct: 1930
- Headquarters: Courbevoie, France
- Key people: Marcel Violet
- Products: Automobiles (Voiturettes)

Galba was a French automobile produced by a company created for the purpose between 1929 and 1930.

Marcel Violet, who had previously created the Sima-Violet cyclecar, founded a new company registered as the Société Sylla at Courbevoie on the northern side of Paris, and immediately announced his introduction of the Galba in the spring of 1929. It was one in a succession of cars designed by Violet, a respected automobile engineer with a particular specialism in two-stroke engines.

The only model was a small "voiturette" automobile that sat on a 2,250 mm (88.6 in) wheelbase and was powered by a 2-stroke twin cylinder engine of 564cc. The power unit was fitted at the front of the car and drove the rear wheels via a two speed transmission and a shaft-drive.

Despite a long gestation period, the Galba proved short-lived. By October 1930 Marcel Violet was already producing the Huascar, a voiturette very similar to the Galba which was indeed produced at the same Courbevoie factory, but which had a slightly larger engine and was produced by a new company called "Voiturettes Huascar".

== Reading list ==
- Harald Linz, Halwart Schrader: Die Internationale Automobil-Enzyklopädie. United Soft Media Verlag, München 2008, ISBN 978-3-8032-9876-8. (German)
- George Nick Georgano (Chefredakteur): The Beaulieu Encyclopedia of the Automobile. Volume 2: G–O. Fitzroy Dearborn Publishers, Chicago 2001, ISBN 1-57958-293-1. (Englich)
- George Nick Georgano: Autos. Encyclopédie complète. 1885 à nos jours. Courtille, Paris 1975. (French)
