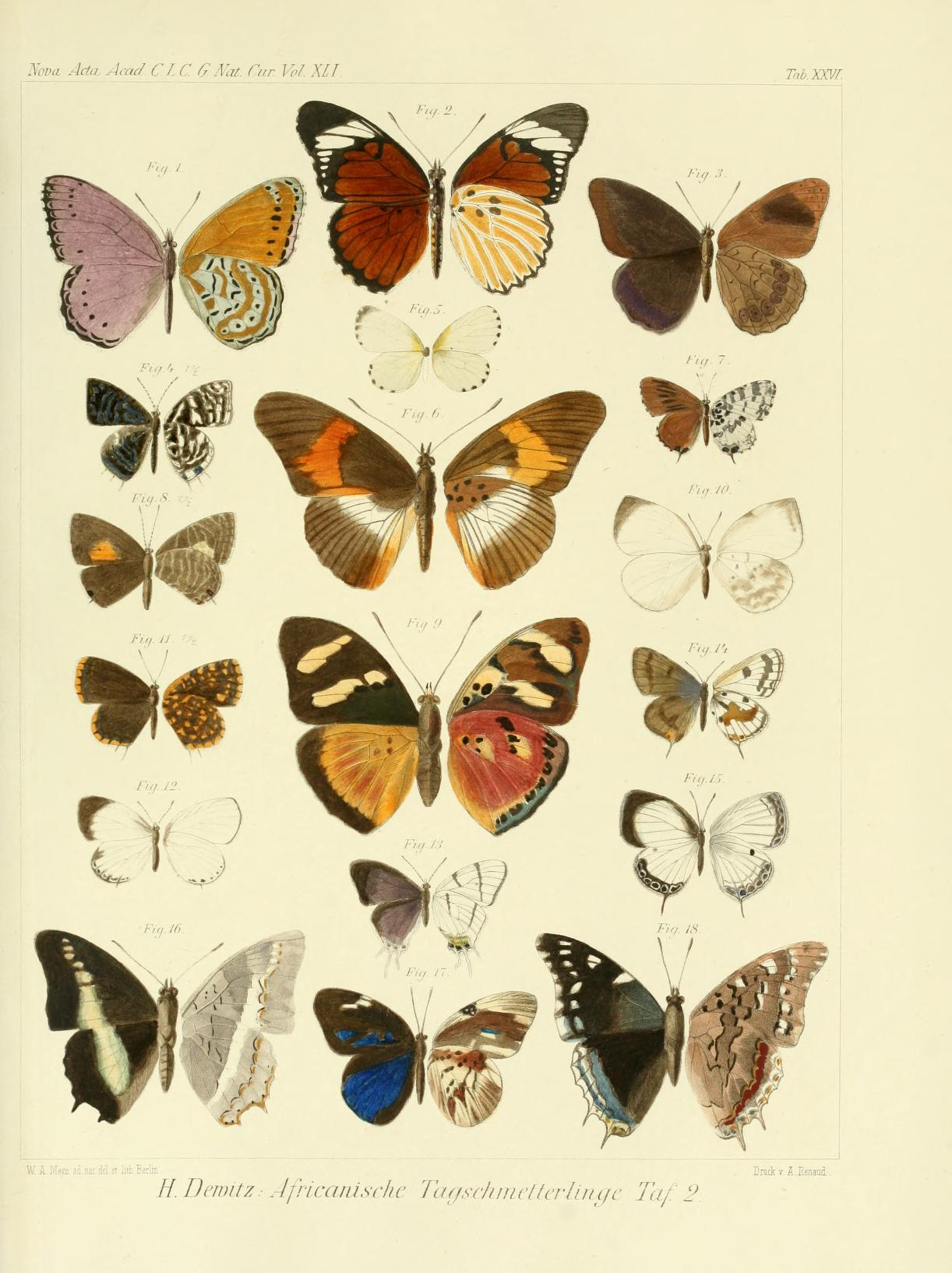
- Figure 15

Scientific classification
- Kingdom: Animalia
- Phylum: Arthropoda
- Clade: Pancrustacea
- Class: Insecta
- Order: Lepidoptera
- Family: Lycaenidae
- Genus: Oboronia
- Species: O. punctatus

Binomial name
- Oboronia punctatus (Dewitz, 1879)

Synonyms
- Plebeius punctatus Dewitz, 1879; Lycaena elorina Staudinger, 1888; Oboronia punctatus f. jacksoni Stempffer, 1942; ? staudingeri Hemming, 1960

= Oboronia punctatus =

Species of butterfly

Oboronia punctatus, the common ginger white, is a butterfly in the family Lycaenidae. It is found in Guinea, Liberia, Ivory Coast, Ghana, Togo, Nigeria (south and the Cross River loop), Cameroon, the Republic of the Congo, Angola, the Central African Republic, the Democratic Republic of the Congo, western Uganda and north-western Tanzania. The habitat consists of forests.

Adults feed on the flowers of the larval host plant.

The larvae feed on Costus dubius and C. afer. They are associated with the ant species Pheidole aurivillii race kasaiensis and P. rotundata.

Torben Larsen developed a species numbering system for his 2005 publication Butterflies of West Africa. This species is #622. The 'Larsen' numbers have since been used with permission in A Sharp Eye on Butterflies of Ghana.
