= Ostrinotes =

- Ostrinotes tarena - dorsal side

Scientific classification
- Domain: Eukaryota
- Kingdom: Animalia
- Phylum: Arthropoda
- Class: Insecta
- Order: Lepidoptera
- Family: Lycaenidae
- Tribe: Eumaeini
- Genus: Ostrinotes; Johnson, Austin, Le Crom & Salazar, 1997

Butterfly genus in family Lycaenidae

Ostrinotes is a Neotropical genus of butterflies in the family Lycaenidae.

== Species ==
- Ostrinotes purpuriticus (H. Druce, 1907) cryptic hairstreak – southeast Mexico to Colombia
- Ostrinotes empusa (Hewitson, 1867) Empusa hairstreak – Panama to Argentina
- Ostrinotes halciones (A. Butler & H. Druce, 1872) halciones hairstreak – Mexico to Brazil
- Ostrinotes tympania (Hewitson, 1869) Brazil
- Ostrinotes tarena (Hewitson, 1874) French Guiana
- Ostrinotes gentiana (H. Druce, 1907) Colombia
- Ostrinotes sospes (Draudt, 1920) Colombia
- Ostrinotes keila (Hewitson, 1869) Keila hairstreak – Mexico to Colombia
- Ostrinotes sophocles (Fabricius, 1793) "Indiis" and Brazil
