= Sulpicius Galba =

Sulpicius Galba may refer to:

- Galba, Roman emperor in 68–69
- Gaius Sulpicius Galba (consul AD 22)
- Publius Sulpicius Galba Maximus
- Servius Sulpicius Galba (disambiguation)

== See also ==
- Sulpicia_gens#Sulpicii_Galbae
