= Oraidium =

Scientific classification
- Domain: Eukaryota
- Kingdom: Animalia
- Phylum: Arthropoda
- Class: Insecta
- Order: Lepidoptera
- Family: Lycaenidae
- Subfamily: Polyommatinae
- Tribe: Polyommatini
- Genus: Oraidium; Bethune-Baker, 1914

Butterfly genus in family Lycaenidae

Oraidium is a monotypic genus of butterflies in the family Lycaenidae.

== Species ==
- Oraidium barberae (Trimen, 1868)
