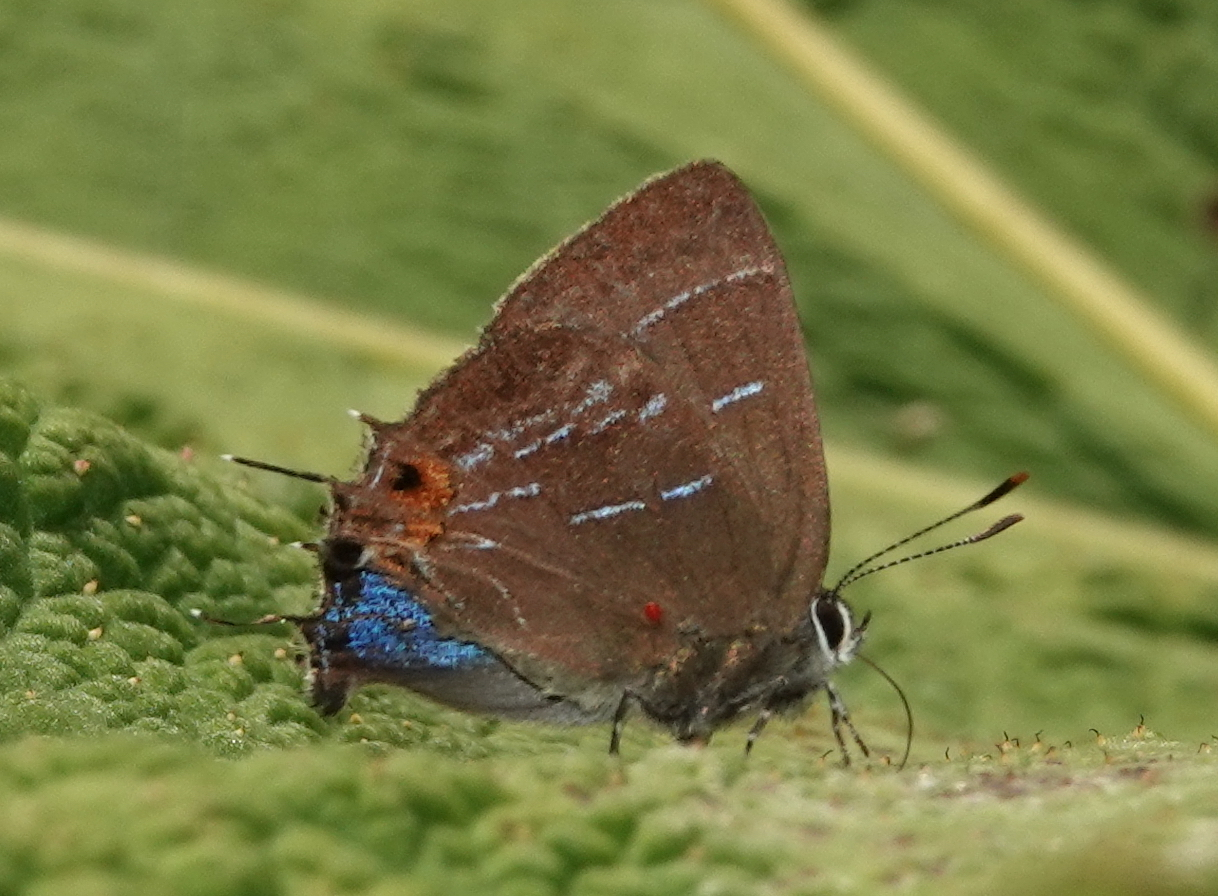
- Ocaria aholiba

Scientific classification
- Domain: Eukaryota
- Kingdom: Animalia
- Phylum: Arthropoda
- Class: Insecta
- Order: Lepidoptera
- Family: Lycaenidae
- Genus: Ocaria; Clench, 1970

Synonyms
- Lamasa K.Johnson, 1992; Variegatta K.Johnson, 1992

= Ocaria =

Butterfly genus in family Lycaenidae

Ocaria is a Neotropical genus of butterflies in the family Lycaenidae.

== Species ==
- Ocaria clenchi (Johnson, 1992)
- Ocaria aholiba (Hewitson, 1867)
- Ocaria clepsydra (Druce, 1907)
- Ocaria arpoxais (Godman & Salvin, [1887])
- Ocaria cinerea (Lathy, 1936)
- Ocaria sadiei (Weeks, 1901)
- Ocaria petelina (Hewitson, 1877)
- Ocaria elvira (Johnson, 1992)
- Ocaria calesia (Hewitson, 1870)
- Ocaria elongata (Hewitson, 1870)
- Ocaria thales (Fabricius, 1793)
- Ocaria arcula (Druce, 1907)
- Ocaria ocrisia (Hewitson, 1868)
