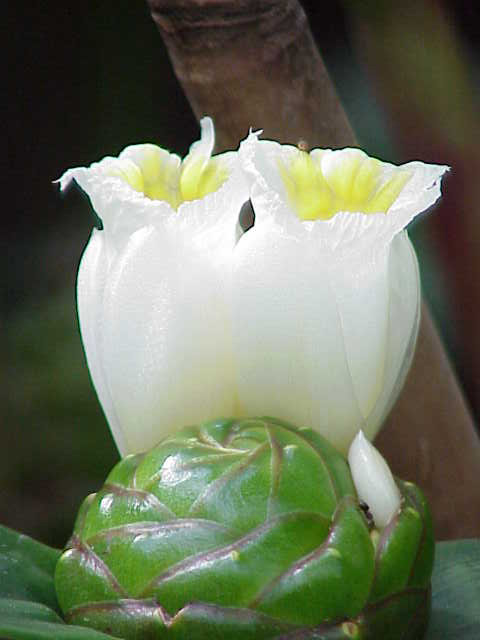

Scientific classification
- Kingdom: Plantae
- Clade: Embryophytes
- Clade: Tracheophytes
- Clade: Spermatophytes
- Clade: Angiosperms
- Clade: Monocots
- Clade: Commelinids
- Order: Zingiberales
- Family: Costaceae
- Genus: Costus
- Species: C. dubius

Binomial name
- Costus dubius (Afzel.) K.Schum.

= Costus dubius =

Species of plant

Costus dubius is a species of plant native to Tropical Africa.

== Description ==
Costus dubius has underground rhizomes which produce leafy stems and inflorescences on separate stalks. The round inflorescences have green bracts; each bract produces a single white flower with a yellow-centered labellum. Costus dubius produces many seeds.

Costus dubius is sometimes confused with several other African species of Costus, such as Costus afer and Costus dinklagei. Costus dubius is the only African species of Costus capable of self-pollination.

== Range ==
Costus dubius has a wide native range and can be found throughout tropical Africa.

Costus dubius has been introduced to several places in which it has become naturalized or invasive including:

- Queensland, Australia
- Java, Indonesia
- Hawaii, U.S.A.

== Habitat ==
In its native Africa, Costus dubius is found in many different types of forest, as well as along rivers and roads and in plantations. Costus dubius prefers wet tropical biomes and does not appear to survive in the subtropics.
