= Monte Testaccio =

Waste mound made from broken Roman pottery

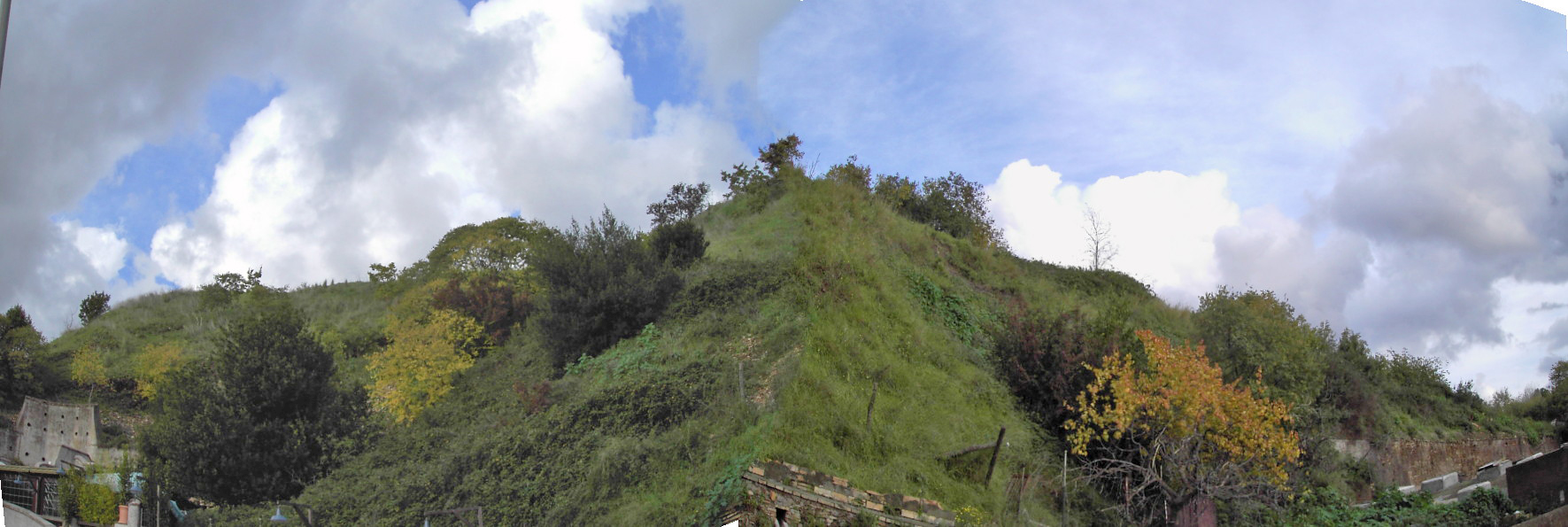

- Location within Rome
- Click on the map to see marker
- 41°52′33″N 12°28′32″E
- Type: Waste mound
- Location: Regio XIII Aventinus

History
- Built: 1st century BC (?) to 3rd century AD

Monte Testaccio (Italian pronunciation: [ˈmonte teˈstattʃo]) or Monte Testaceo, also known as Monte dei Cocci, is an artificial mound in Rome composed almost entirely of testae (Italian: cocci), fragments of broken ancient Roman pottery, nearly all discarded amphorae, some of which were labelled with tituli picti. It is one of the largest spoil heaps found anywhere in the ancient world, covering an area of 2 hectares (4.9 acres) at its base and with a volume of approximately 580,000 cubic metres (760,000 cu yd), containing the remains of an estimated 53 million amphorae. It has a circumference of nearly a kilometre (0.6 mi) and stands 35 metres (115 ft) high, though it was probably considerably higher in ancient times. It stands a short distance away from the east bank of the River Tiber, near the Horrea Galbae where the state-controlled reserve of olive oil was stored in the late 2nd century AD. The mound later had both religious and military significance.

== Structure and purpose ==
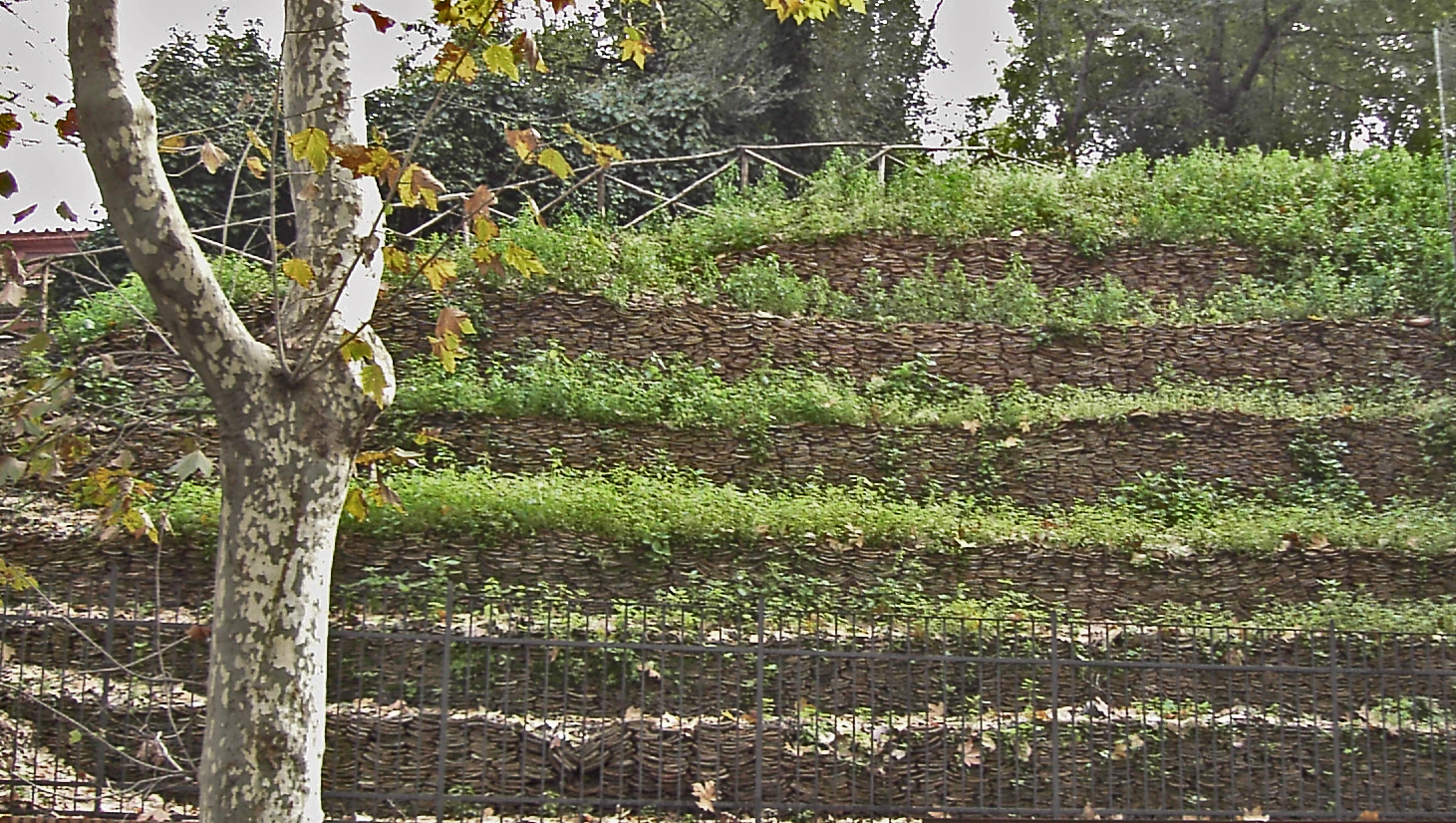
Terraces on Monte Testaccio

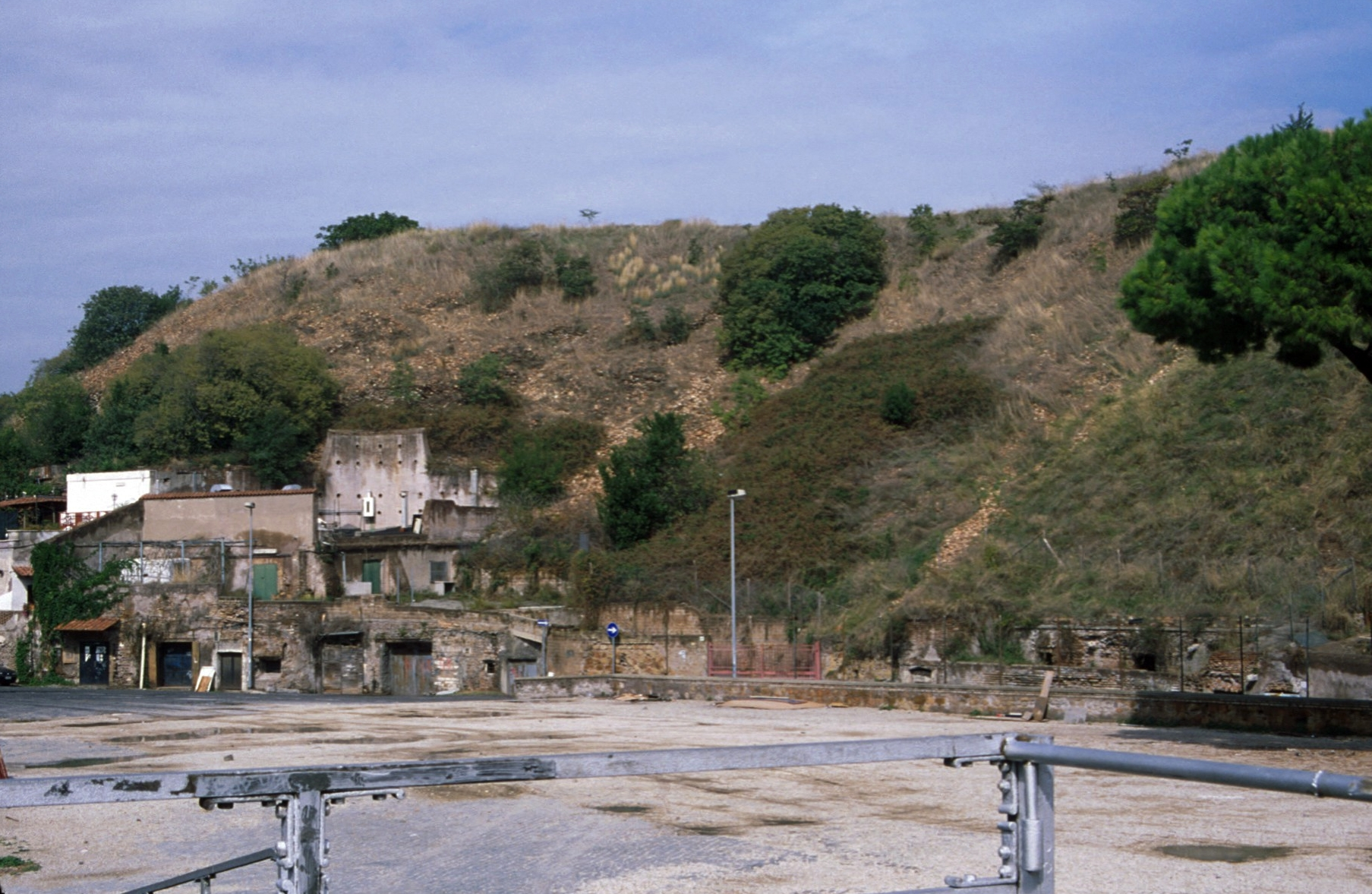
Monte Testaccio

The huge numbers of broken amphorae at Monte Testaccio illustrate the enormous demand for oil of imperial Rome, which was at the time the world's largest city, with a population of at least one million people. It has been estimated that the hill contains the remains of as many as 53 million olive oil amphorae, in which some 6 billion litres (1.3 billion imperial gallons/1.6 billion U.S. gallons) of oil were imported. Studies of the hill's composition suggest that Rome's imports of olive oil reached a peak towards the end of the 2nd century AD, when as many as 130,000 amphorae were being deposited on the site each year. The vast majority of those vessels had a capacity of some 70 liters (15 imp gal; 18 U.S. gal); from this it has been estimated that Rome was importing at least 7.5 million liters (1.6 million imperial gal/2 million U.S. gal) of olive oil annually. As the vessels found at Monte Testaccio appear to represent mainly state-sponsored olive oil imports, it is very likely that considerable additional quantities of olive oil were imported privately.

Monte Testaccio was not simply a haphazard waste dump; it was a highly organised and carefully engineered creation, presumably managed by a state administrative authority. Excavations carried out in 1991 showed that the mound had been raised as a series of level terraces with retaining walls made of nearly intact amphorae filled with sherds to anchor them in place. Empty amphorae were probably carried up the mound intact on the backs of donkeys or mules and then broken up on the spot, with the sherds laid out in a stable pattern. Lime appears to have been sprinkled over the broken pots to neutralise the smell of rancid oil.

As the oldest parts of Monte Testaccio are at the bottom of the mound, it is difficult to say with any certainty when it was first created. Deposits found by excavators have been dated to a period between approximately AD 140 to 250, but it is possible that dumping could have begun on the site as early as the 1st century BC. The mound has a roughly triangular shape comprising two distinct platforms, the eastern side being the oldest. At least four distinct series of terraces were built in a stepped arrangement. Layers of small sherds were laid down in some places, possibly to serve as paths for those carrying out the waste disposal operations.

== Re-use and disposal of amphorae ==
The hill was constructed using mostly the fragments of large globular 70-liter (15 imp gal; 18 U.S. gal) vessels from Baetica (the Guadalquivir region of modern Spain), of a type now known as Dressel 20. It also included smaller numbers of two types of amphorae from Tripolitania (Libya) and Byzacena (Tunisia). All three types of vessel were used to transport olive oil. However, it is not clear why Monte Testaccio was built using only olive oil vessels. The oil itself was probably decanted into bulk containers when the amphorae were unloaded at the port, in much the same way as other staples such as grain. There is no equivalent mound of broken grain or wine amphorae and the overwhelming majority of the amphorae found at Monte Testaccio are of one single type, which raises the question of why the Romans found it necessary to dispose of the amphorae in this way.

One possibility is that the Dressel 20 amphora, the principal type found at Monte Testaccio, may have been unusually difficult to recycle. Many types of amphora could be re-used to carry the same type of product or modified to serve a different purpose—for instance, as drain pipes or flower pots. Fragmentary amphorae could be pounded into chips to use in opus signinum, a type of concrete widely used as a building material, or could simply be used as landfill. The Dressel 20 amphora, however, broke into large curved fragments that could not readily be reduced to small shards. It is likely that the difficulty of reusing or repurposing the Dressel 20s meant that it was more economical to discard them.

Another reason for not re-cycling olive oil amphorae into concrete of the opus signinum type may have been that the fragments were too fatty due to residual oil. Also, oil happens to react chemically with lime (a major component of concrete) and the product of this chemical reaction is soap; the resulting concrete would have had unsatisfactory quality. Wheat amphorae and wine amphorae on the other hand were certainly "clean" enough to be recycled into concrete.

== Tituli picti ==
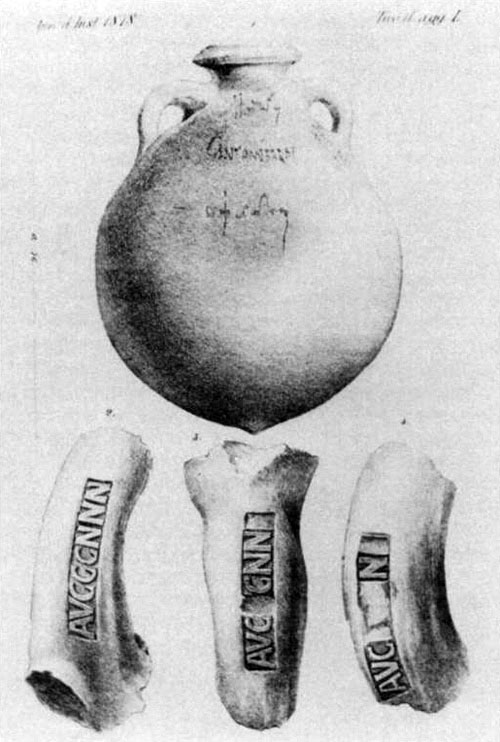
A Dressel 20 amphora with examples of tituli picti and potters' stamps found at Monte Testaccio

Monte Testaccio has provided archaeologists with a rare insight into the ancient Roman economy. The amphorae deposited in the mound were often labelled with tituli picti, painted or stamped inscriptions which record information such as the weight of the oil contained in the vessel, the names of the people who weighed and documented the oil and the name of the district where the oil was originally bottled. This has allowed archaeologists to determine that the oil in the vessels was imported under state authority and was designated for the annona urbis (distribution to the people of Rome) or the annona militaris (distribution to the army). Indeed, some of the inscriptions found on mid-2nd century vessels at Monte Testaccio specifically record that the oil they once contained was delivered to the praefectus annonae, the official in charge of the state-run food distribution service. It is possible that Monte Testaccio was also managed by the praefectus annonae.

The tituli picti on the Monte Testaccio amphorae tend to follow a standard pattern and indicate a rigorous system of inspection to control trade and deter fraud. An amphora was first weighed while empty, and its weight was marked on the outside of the vessel. The name of the export merchant was then noted, followed by a line giving the weight of the oil contained in the amphora (subtracting the previously determined weight of the vessel itself). Those responsible for carrying out and monitoring the weighing then signed their names on the amphora and the location of the farm from which the oil originated was also noted. The maker of the amphora was often identified by a stamp on the vessel's handle.

The inscriptions also provide evidence of the structure of the oil export business. Apart from single names, many inscriptions list combinations such as "the two Aurelii Heraclae, father and son", "the Fadii", "Cutius Celsianus and Fabius Galaticus", "the two Junii, Melissus and Melissa", "the partners Hyacinthus, Isidore and Pollio", "L. Marius Phoebus and the Vibii, Viator and Retitutus." This suggests that many of those involved were members of joint enterprises, perhaps small workshops involving business partners, father-son teams and skilled freedmen.

== Later history ==
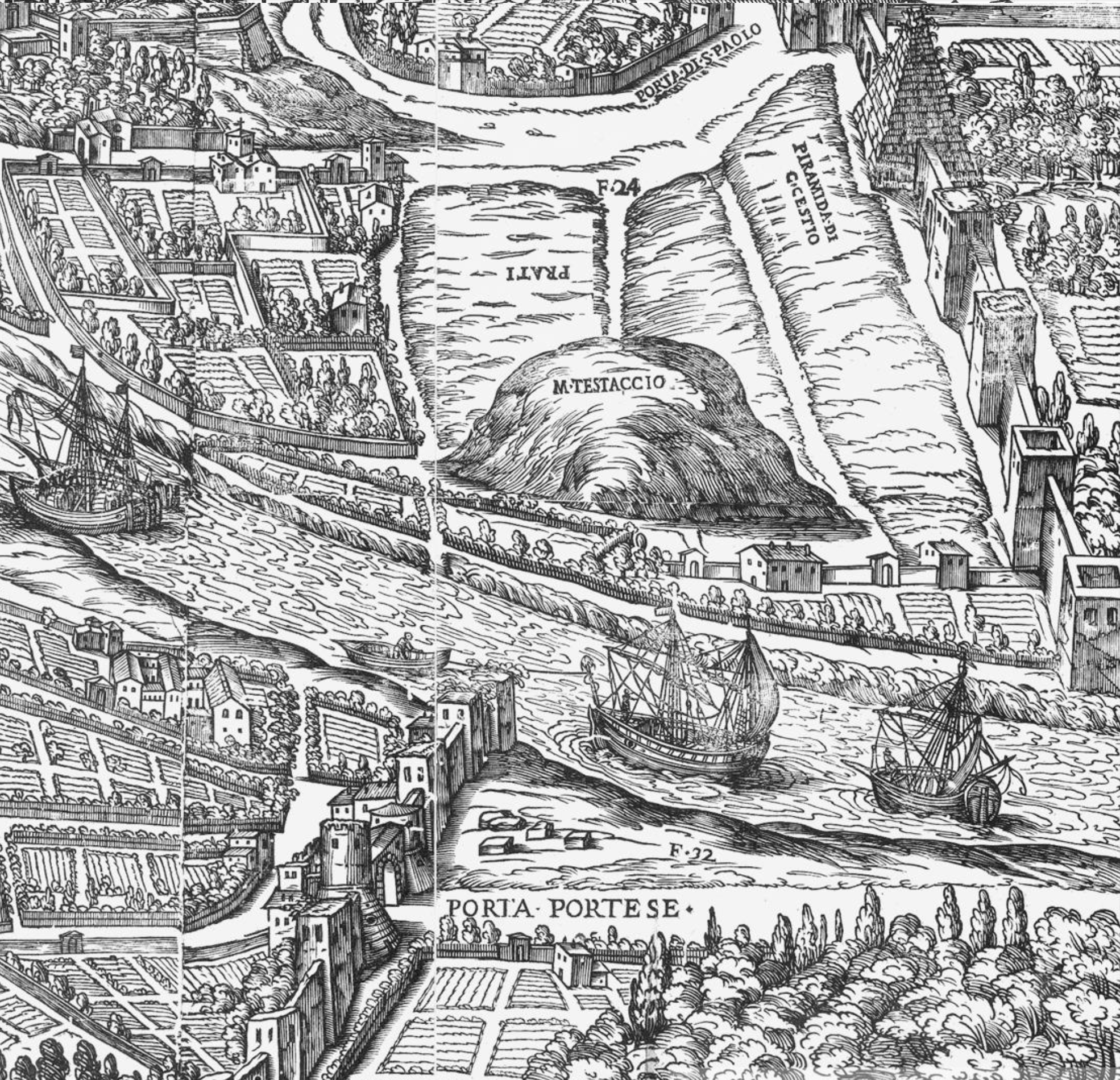
The Testaccio district in 1625, showing Monte Testaccio surrounded by wasteland

Monte Testaccio's use as an amphora dump seems to have ceased after about the 260s, perhaps due to the city's quays being moved elsewhere. A new type of amphora was also introduced around this time to transport olive oil. A need to dispose of these bulky containers remained. Nine buildings in the Rome area constructed in the fourth century have been found to use amphorae as space filler/lightener elements in their concrete portions. One example is the Circus of Maxentius, which was constructed between 308 and 312 at the third mile of the Via Appia: it is estimated that at least 6,000 and more likely as many as 10,000 amphorae were used in this facility. As Peña notes, directing these vessels "toward state-sponsored construction projects for use as space-fillers in concrete vaulting, the praefectura annonae could have succeeded in disposing of substantial numbers of highly cumbersome and otherwise useless oil containers, while at the same time reducing the amount of lime, sand and rubble that would have been required to complete these initiatives."

The area around the hill was largely abandoned after the fall of Rome. A print of 1625 depicts Monte Testaccio standing in isolation in an area of wasteland within the ancient city walls, and even as late as the mid-19th century the surrounding area was little more than a "romantic desert" with only "a few shabby houses". It was the scene of jousts and tournaments during the Middle Ages, when Monte Testaccio was the scene of pre-Lenten celebrations. As part of the festivities, two carts filled with pigs were hauled to the top of the hill, then released to run back down and smash in pieces at the bottom of the hill, where the watching revellers then dismembered the pigs on the spot for roasting.

Monte Testaccio was still used as a place of recreation when Stendhal visited in 1827. A 19th-century traveller, visiting a few years earlier, described the annual festival that was held on the summit of the hill:

Each Sunday and Thursday during the month of October, almost the whole population of Rome, rich and poor, throng to this spot, where innumerable tables are covered with refreshments, and the wine is drawn cool from the vaults. It is impossible to conceive a more animating scene than the summit of the hill presents. Gay groups dancing the saltarella, intermingled with the jovial circles which surround the tables; the immense crowd of walkers who, leaving their carriages below, stroll about to enjoy the festive scene ...

The hill gained a brief military significance in 1849 when it was used as the site of an Italian gun battery, under the command of Giuseppe Garibaldi, in the defence of Rome against an attacking French army. Its economic significance was somewhat greater, as the hill's interior was discovered to have unusual cooling properties which investigators attributed to the ventilation produced by its porous structure. This made it ideal for wine storage during the heat of the Roman summer, and caves were excavated for that purpose.

Monte Testaccio also had a religious significance; it was formerly used on Good Friday to represent the hill of Golgotha in Jerusalem, when the Pope would lead a procession to the summit and place crosses to represent those of Jesus and the two thieves crucified alongside him. Monte Testaccio is still crowned with a cross in commemoration of the event. Only after World War II was the area around the hill redeveloped, as a working-class neighbourhood.

The first archaeological investigation of Monte Testaccio began in January 1872 under the German archaeologist Heinrich Dressel, who published his results in 1878. Further work was carried out in the 1980s by the Spanish archaeologists Emilio Rodríguez Almeida and José Remesal Rodríguez.

== See also ==
- Roman commerce
- Urban archaeology
- Terra preta
