= Idioglossa metallochrysa =

Scientific classification
- Kingdom: Animalia
- Phylum: Arthropoda
- Clade: Pancrustacea
- Class: Insecta
- Order: Lepidoptera
- Family: Epimarptidae
- Genus: Idioglossa
- Species: I. metallochrysa

Binomial name
- Idioglossa metallochrysa A.J. Turner, 1917

Moth species in family Batrachedridae

Idioglossa metallochrysa is a very small species of golden-metallic coloured moth of the family Epimarptidae living in a subtropical highland climate, at least in Australia, and of which the caterpillars feed on the plant Cheilocostus speciosus, at least in Indonesia.

== Taxonomy ==
It was first described by Alfred Jefferis Turner in 1917 from three specimens collected in November on Tamborine Mountain in Queensland, Australia. They were apparently all female. There are three syntypes, two are kept at Australian National Insect Collection, and one at the Natural History Museum, London, courtesy of Edward Meyrick.

The Australian entomologist Ian Francis Bell Common classified it in the subfamily Stathmopodinae of the family Oecophoridae in 1996. It was reclassified in the subfamily Batrachedrinae of the Batrachedridae by Kazuhiro Sugisima in 2000, based on more detailed examination of the genitalia.

=== Etymology ===
In the original description, Jefferis Turner derives the specific epithet from the word μεταλλοχρυσος, which he states signifies 'golden-metallic'.

== Description ==
The wingspan is only 9–10 mm. The head, antenna and palpi, and the legs, are whitish. The thorax and the rest of the body is ochreous-whitish.

The fore-wings are also ochreous-whitish, but with a suffused fuscous spot under the costa, an "ochreous suffusion between it and dorsum", and some golden-metallic scales in a line from three-fourths of the costa to the termen beneath the middle. The both pairs of wings have long hairs coming off them, which Jefferis Turner terms cilia in his description, in the fore-wing these are ochreous coloured, dorsally grey, whereas in the hind-wing they are "grey-whitish". The hind-wings are ochreous, but with four transverse "golden-metallic" bands across them, the last one of which is broader than the others, and edged at the end of the wing with fuscous.

== Distribution ==
It is known from Kuranda in Queensland, Australia, but has also been found on the island of Java, Indonesia.

== Ecology ==
The locality it was collected, Tamborine Mountain, has a cool subtropical highland climate, with the annual rainfall of about 1,550 mm. The imagoes (adult moths) are known to be active in November, based on when they were first collected, which is at the beginning of the warmer rainy season. In Java, Cheilocostus speciosus has been recorded as a host plant for the caterpillars of this species, This is a mid-sized, herbaceous, ginger-like plant from the tropical forest understory in the Costaceae family.

== See also ==
- List of moths of Australia
