= Hellenia lacera =

Scientific classification
- Kingdom: Plantae
- Clade: Tracheophytes
- Clade: Angiosperms
- Clade: Monocots
- Clade: Commelinids
- Order: Zingiberales
- Family: Costaceae
- Genus: Hellenia
- Species: H. lacera

Binomial name
- Hellenia lacera (Gagnep.) Govaerts

Synonyms
- Cheilocostus lacerus (Gagnep.) C.D.Specht; Costus lacerus Gagnep.

Species of flowering plant

Hellenia lacera is a species of flowering plant in the Costaceae family. It was first described by François Gagnepain. Its native range is Nepal to northern Indochina and southern China. It is also cultivated as an ornamental.

Hellenia lacera is similar in appearance to Hellenia speciosa (formerly Cheilocostus speciosus), and they can grow together in the same habitats. However, rather than a stem which spirals as it grows, Hellenia lacera generally has a straight, upright stem.
