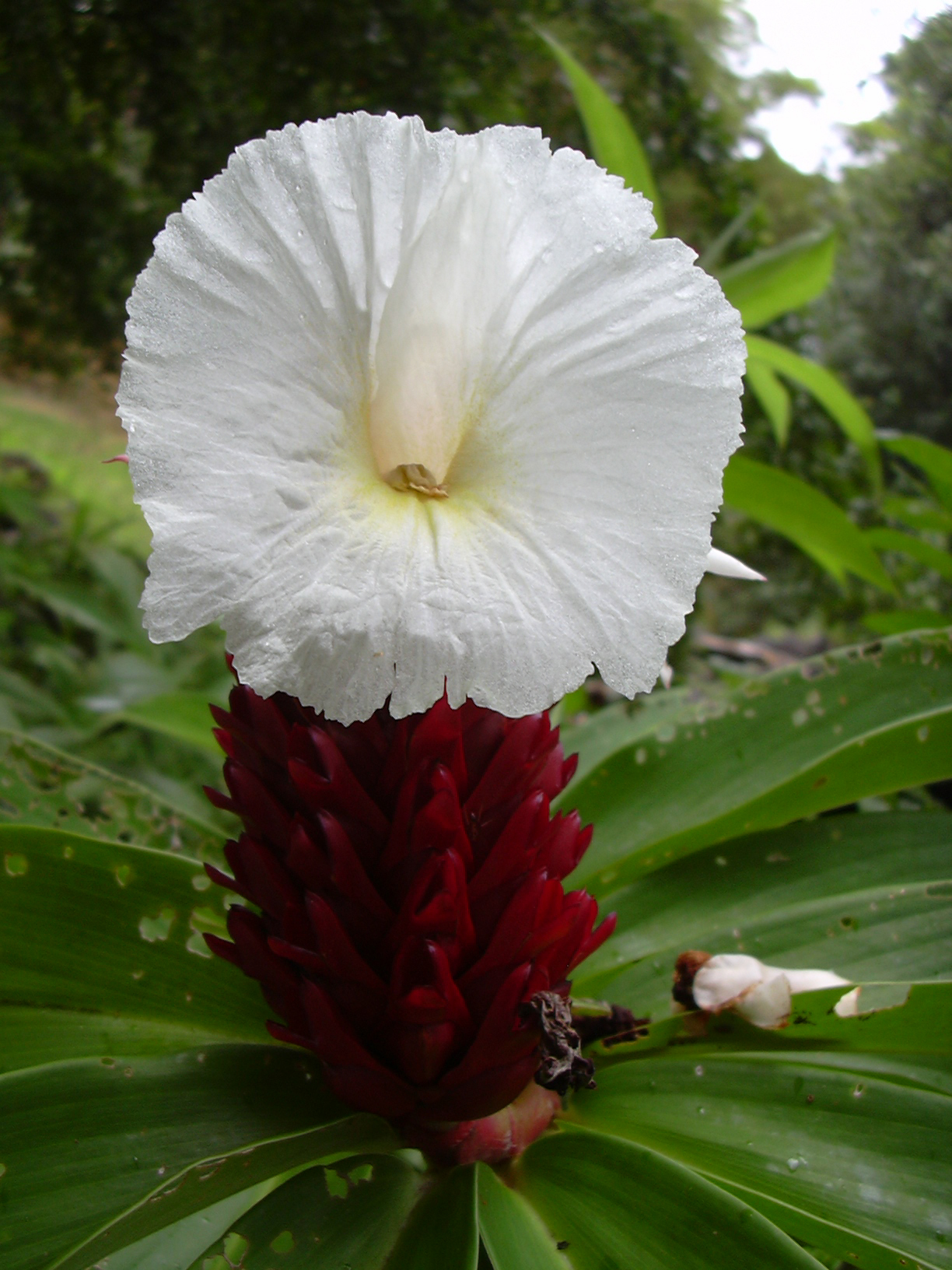
- Hellenia speciosa (as "Costus speciosus")

Scientific classification
- Kingdom: Plantae
- Clade: Tracheophytes
- Clade: Angiosperms
- Clade: Monocots
- Clade: Commelinids
- Order: Zingiberales
- Family: Costaceae
- Genus: Hellenia; Retz. 1791 not Willd. 1797 (syn of Alpinia in Zingiberaceae)

Synonyms
- Banksea J.Koenig 1783, illegitimate parahomonym, not Banksia J.R Forster & J. G. A. Forster 1775 (Thymelaeaceae) nor Banksia L. f. 1782 (Proteaceae) nor Banksia Bruce 1790 (Rosaceae) nor Banksia Dombey ex DC. 1828 (Lythraceae); Cheilocostus C.D.Specht; Planera Giseke 1792, illegitimate homonym not J.F. Gmel. 1791 (Ulmaceae); Pyxa Noronha; Tsiana J.F.Gmel.

= Hellenia =

Genus of flowering plants

Hellenia is a genus of plants in the Costaceae described as a genus with this name in 1791. It is native to Southeast Asia, southern China, the Indian subcontinent, New Guinea, and Queensland. The type species was "H. grandiflora" Retz., which is a synonym of Hellenia speciosa.

== Species ==
Plants of the World Online currently includes the following (with some botanists preferring to retain the genus Cheilocostus):

- Hellenia deliniana Juan Chen, L.Y.Zeng & N.H.Xia
- Hellenia lacera (Gagnep.) Govaerts
- Hellenia meghalayensis Ram.Kumar, Sushil K.Singh & B.K.Sinha
- Hellenia oblonga (S.Q.Tong) Juan Chen, L.Y.Zeng & N.H.Xia
- Hellenia paramjitii Ram.Kumar, Sushil K.Singh & S.Sharma
- Hellenia sopuensis (Maas & H.Maas) Govaerts
- Hellenia speciosa (J.Koenig) S.R.Dutta (synonym Cheilocostus speciosus) – China, Indian Subcontinent, Andaman & Nicobar, Indochina, Malaysia, Indonesia, Philippines, New Guinea, Bismarck Archipelago, Queensland; naturalized in Mauritius, Réunion, Hawaii, Central America, West Indies
- Hellenia viridis (S.Q.Tong) Juan Chen, L.Y.Zeng & N.H.Xia

=== Formerly included ===
now in other genera: Alpinia, Hornstedtia, Parahellenia, Plagiostachys

- H. abnormis – Alpinia chinensis
- H. alba – Alpinia galanga
- H. allughas – Alpinia nigra
- H. aquatica – Alpinia aquatica
- H. arctiflora – Alpinia arctiflora
- H. borneensis (A.D.Poulsen) Govaerts – Parahellenia borneensis (A.D.Poulsen) N.H.Xia, Juan Chen & S.Jin Zeng
- H. bracteata – Alpinia ludwigiana
- H. caerulea – Alpinia caerulea
- H. chinensis – Alpinia chinensis
- H. globosa (Blume) S.R.Dutta – Parahellenia globosa (Blume) N.H.Xia, Juan Chen & S.Jin Zeng
- H. gracilis – Alpinia elegans
- H. melanocarpa – Alpinia aquatica
- H. parviflora – Plagiostachys parviflora
- H. pubiflora – Alpinia pubiflora
- H. rubra – Hornstedtia rubra
- H. rufa – Alpinia rufa
- H. scabra – Alpinia scabra
