= Idioglossa thailandica =

Scientific classification
- Domain: Eukaryota
- Kingdom: Animalia
- Phylum: Arthropoda
- Class: Insecta
- Order: Lepidoptera
- Family: Epimarptidae
- Genus: Idioglossa
- Species: I. thailandica

Binomial name
- Idioglossa thailandica Sugisima, 2004

Moth species in family Batrachedridae

Idioglossa thailandica is a species of moth of the family Epimarptidae. It is known from Kanchanaburi, Thailand.

The wingspan is about 8 mm. The forewings of this species are chrome-yellowish, mottled with dark brownish scales and a silvery streak at one-fifth.
