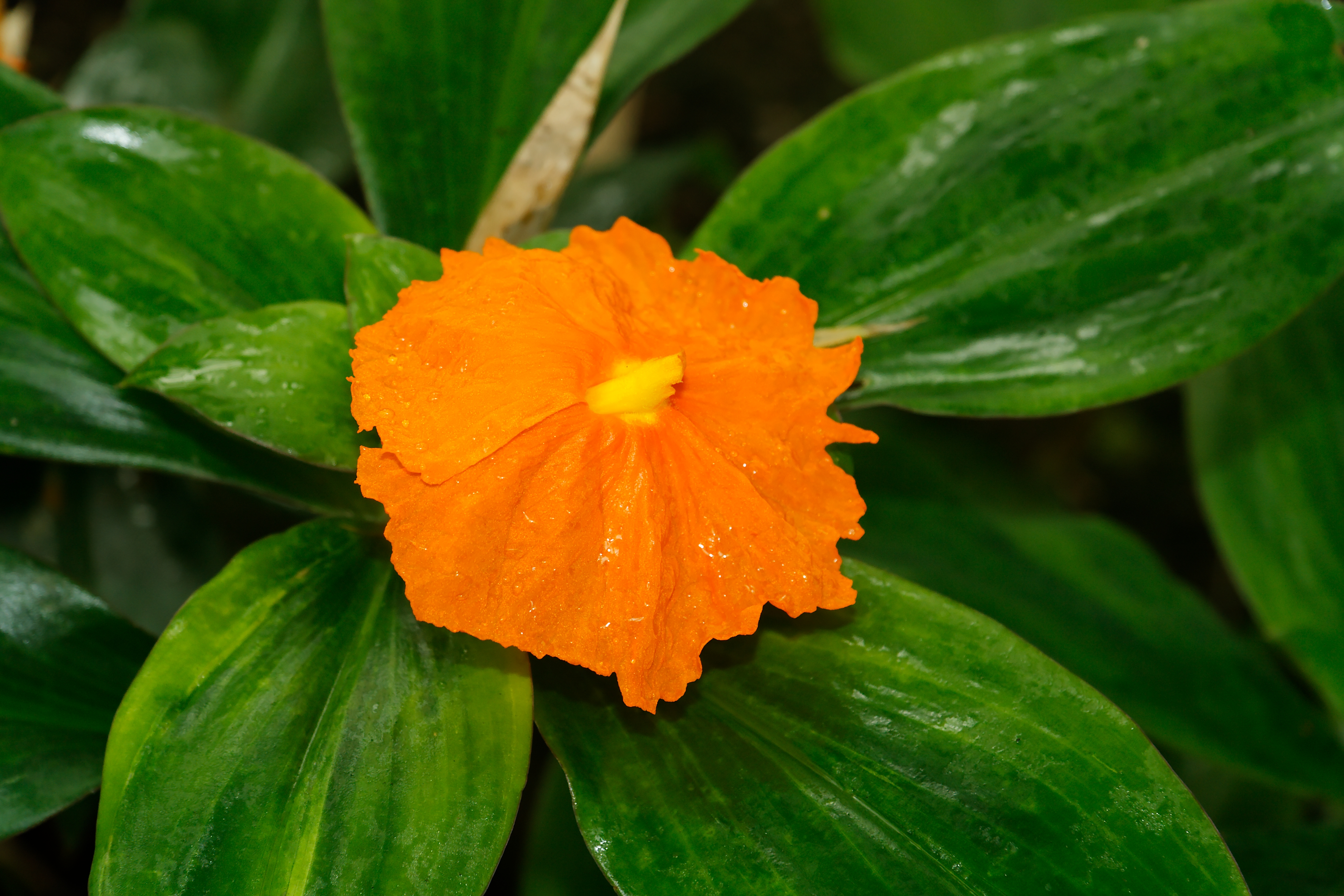

Scientific classification
- Kingdom: Plantae
- Clade: Tracheophytes
- Clade: Angiosperms
- Clade: Monocots
- Clade: Commelinids
- Order: Zingiberales
- Family: Costaceae
- Genus: Chamaecostus
- Species: C. cuspidatus

Binomial name
- Chamaecostus cuspidatus (Nees & Mart.) C.Specht & D.W.Stev.

Synonyms
- Costus cuspidatus (Nees & Mart.) Maas; Costus igneus N.E.Br.; Globba cuspidata Nees & Mart.

= Chamaecostus cuspidatus =

Species of flowering plant

Chamaecostus cuspidatus, common name fiery costus or spiral flag, is a species of herbaceous plant in the family Costaceae native to eastern Brazil (States of Bahia and Espírito Santo). In India, it is known as insulin plant for its purported anti-diabetic properties. Chamaecostus cuspidatus has large fleshy-looking leaves. The undersides of these large, smooth, dark green leaves have light purple shade. The leaves are spirally arranged around the stem, forming attractive, arching clumps arising from underground rootstocks. The maximum height of these plants is about two feet. The flowers are orange in color and are 1.5 in (3.8 cm) in diameter. Flowering occurs during the warm months and they appear to be cone-like heads at the tips of branches.

== Cultivation ==
In Siddha medicine, it is known as kostum. It is being cultivated in Kashmir and the Himalayan regions for its root. It is related to the gingers and was originally part of the family Zingiberaceae. The plant grows very quickly. Propagation is by stem cutting. It needs sunshine but it also grows in slightly shady areas. It is cultivated in India for its use in traditional medicine and elsewhere as an ornamental.

== Traditional medicine ==
The dried leaves are used in Ayurvedic medicine.
