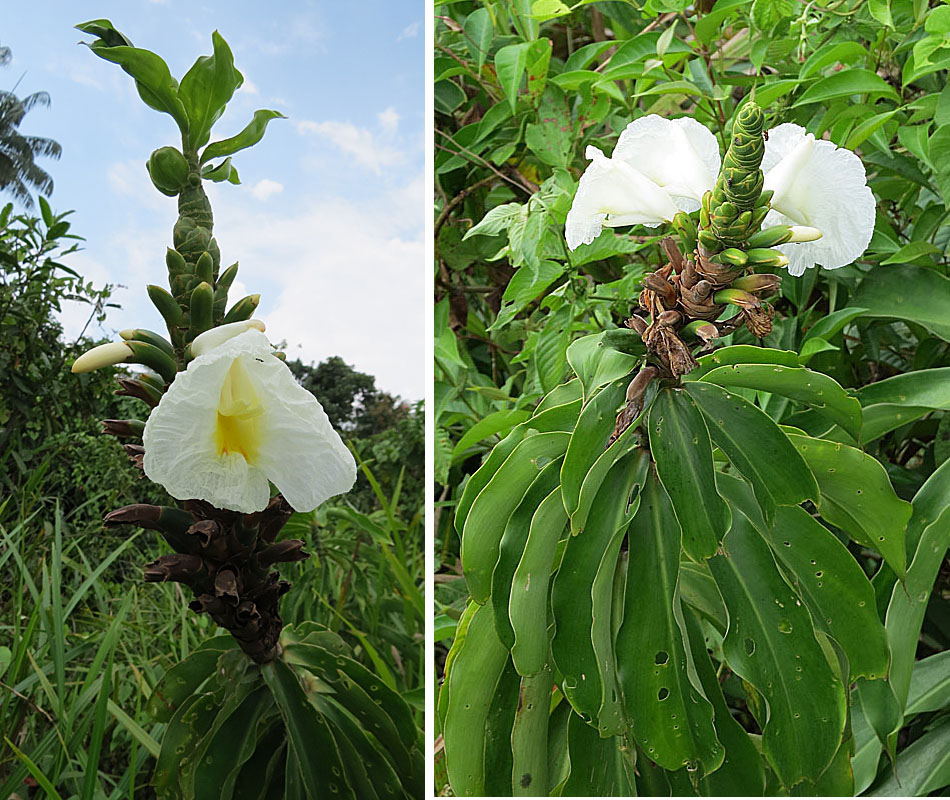
- Dimerocostus strobilaceus

Scientific classification
- Kingdom: Plantae
- Clade: Tracheophytes
- Clade: Angiosperms
- Clade: Monocots
- Clade: Commelinids
- Order: Zingiberales
- Family: Costaceae
- Genus: Dimerocostus; Kuntze

Synonyms
- Mulfordia Rusby

= Dimerocostus =

Genus of flowering plants

Dimerocostus is a group of flowering plants in the Costaceae described as a genus in 1891. It is native to Central and South America.

Dimerocostus can be can be distinguished from Costus, Monocostus, and Chamaecostus by its two chambered ovary (rather than three chambered).

Species

- Dimerocostus argenteus (Ruiz & Pav.) Maas - Peru, Bolivia
- Dimerocostus cryptocalyx N.R.Salinas & Betancur - Colombia
- Dimerocostus strobilaceus Kuntze - Honduras, Nicaragua, Costa Rica, Panama, Colombia, Venezuela (including Venezuelan Antilles), Guyana, Suriname, Ecuador, Peru, Bolivia
