= Idioglossa triumphalis =

Scientific classification
- Domain: Eukaryota
- Kingdom: Animalia
- Phylum: Arthropoda
- Class: Insecta
- Order: Lepidoptera
- Family: Epimarptidae
- Genus: Idioglossa
- Species: I. triumphalis

Binomial name
- Idioglossa triumphalis Meyrick, 1918

Moth species in family Batrachedridae

Idioglossa triumphalis is a species of moth of the family Epimarptidae. It is known from Mozambique.
