= Idioglossa triacma =

Scientific classification
- Kingdom: Animalia
- Phylum: Arthropoda
- Clade: Pancrustacea
- Class: Insecta
- Order: Lepidoptera
- Family: Epimarptidae
- Genus: Idioglossa
- Species: I. triacma

Binomial name
- Idioglossa triacma Meyrick, 1913

Moth species in family Batrachedridae

Idioglossa triacma is a species of moth in the family Epimarptidae. It is known from the Khasi Hills of India.

The wingspan is about 10 mm. The forewings are orange-yellow with a purplish-fuscous-golden triangular blotch at one-third, almost reaching the costa.

== Biology ==
The host plant of this species is Commelina benghalensis (Commelinaceae).

== Related pages ==
- List of moths of India
