= Idioglossa polliacola =

Scientific classification
- Kingdom: Animalia
- Phylum: Arthropoda
- Clade: Pancrustacea
- Class: Insecta
- Order: Lepidoptera
- Family: Epimarptidae
- Genus: Idioglossa
- Species: I. polliacola

Binomial name
- Idioglossa polliacola Sugisima, 2000

Moth species

Idioglossa polliacola is a species of moth of the family Epimarptidae.

== Taxonomy ==
It was described as a new species and placed in the family Batrachedridae by Kazuhiro Sugisima and Yutaka Arita in 2000 (but later moved to Epimarptidae). Arita had studied the unknown species for decades before being identified as an Idioglossa. It is known from Japan, where it is quite abundant in the forests of Honshu.

== Description ==
The wingspan is 8–9.7 mm. The fore-wings of this species are chrome-yellowish with four metallic greyish markings.

== Ecology ==
The caterpillars use the Commelinaceae plant Pollia japonica, a common, herbaceous, understory, ground-covering plant in Japanese woodlands, as a host plant. They feed on the undersides of the leaves, each caterpillar individually constructing an elaborate web of silken sheets held off the lower surface of the leaf by tiny pillars of its own frass. The caterpillars furthermore always chew a small hole through the leaf as an extra escape hatch, rapidly flipping to a specially constructed silken pouch on the upper leaf surface when potential danger nears. The caterpillar remains inconspicuously hidden under this sheet throughout its development. The cocoons are constructed on the upper leaf surface near the midrib.

== Related pages ==
- List of moths of Japan
