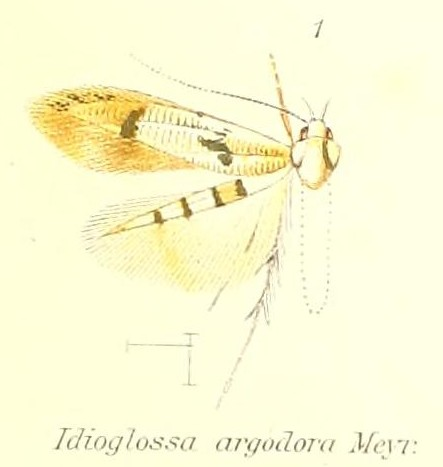
- Idioglossa argodora

Scientific classification
- Kingdom: Animalia
- Phylum: Arthropoda
- Clade: Pancrustacea
- Class: Insecta
- Order: Lepidoptera
- Family: Epimarptidae
- Genus: Idioglossa; Walsingham, 1881

Species
- See text

Synonyms
- Idiostoma Walsingham, 1882; Metamorpha Frey & Boll, 1878

= Idioglossa =

Genus of moths

Idioglossa is a genus of moths of the family Epimarptidae, it was previously part of Batrachedridae or others (see below).

== Taxonomy ==
The genus was created by Thomas de Grey, 6th Baron Walsingham in 1881 to house the new species Idioglossa bigemma. As Lord Walsingham created it under a then monotypic genus, the species I. bigemma is considered the type species by monotypy. The next year (1882), Lord Walsingham proposed to rename the taxon as Idiostoma, as he considered his previous name inappropriate, but by the rules of nomenclature this later suggested amendment is unnecessary.

The Australian entomologist Ian Common classified it in the subfamily Stathmopodinae of the family Oecophoridae in 1996. It was reclassified in the subfamily Batrachedrinae of the Batrachedridae by Kazuhiro Sugisima in 2000 when another species was described. Subsequently, it was included in Epimarptidae Meyrick, 1914. Later, the geographic range of the genus was expanded to include Thailand. Another of the included species is known from the Southeastern United States.

== Species ==
The genus contains the following species:

- Idioglossa argodora Meyrick, 1913 - India (Southern States)
- Idioglossa bigemma Walsingham, 1881
  - Idioglossa bigemma ssp. bigemma - South Africa etc. (Southern Africa)
  - Idioglossa bigemma ssp. mascarena Bippus, 2016 - Réunion
- Idioglossa metallochrysa A.J. Turner, 1917 - Australia (northern Queensland)
- Idioglossa miraculosa (Frey & Boll, 1878) - USA (Southeastern states)
- Idioglossa polliacola Sugisima, 2000 - Japan
- Idioglossa thailandica Sugisima, 2004 - Thailand
- Idioglossa triacma Meyrick, 1913 - India (Assam, Khasi Hills)
- Idioglossa triumphalis Meyrick, 1918 - Mozambique (Bela Vista)

== Ecology ==
Of the species of which a host plant is known, the caterpillars feed on plants of the families Costaceae, Gramineae or Commelinaceae.
