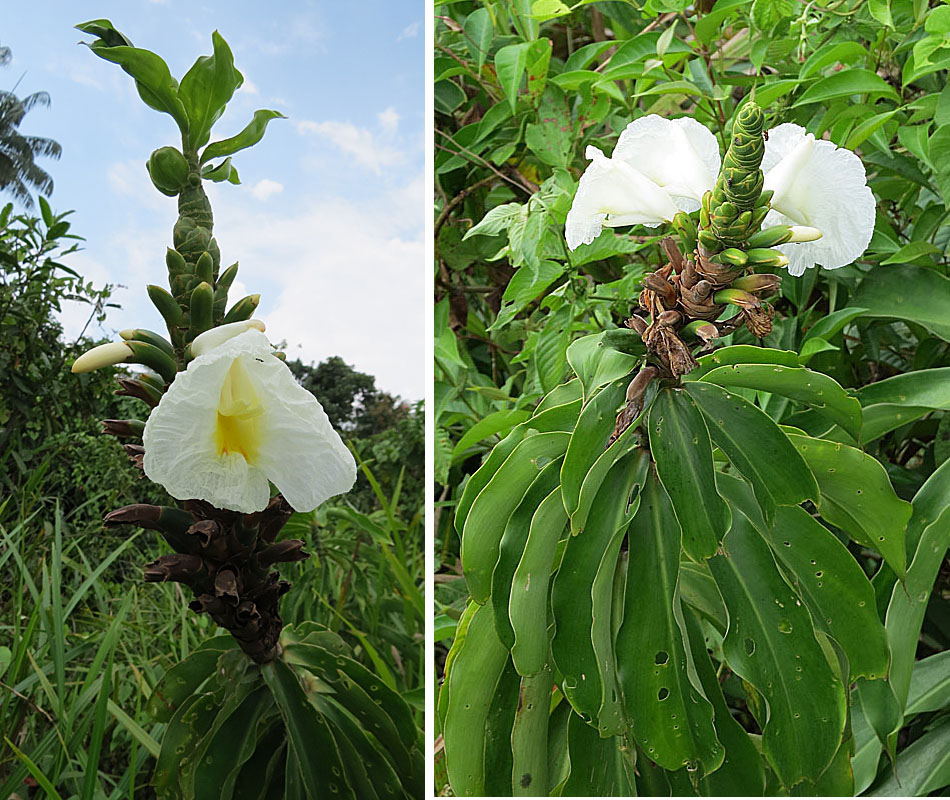

Scientific classification
- Kingdom: Plantae
- Clade: Tracheophytes
- Clade: Angiosperms
- Clade: Monocots
- Clade: Commelinids
- Order: Zingiberales
- Family: Costaceae
- Genus: Dimerocostus
- Species: D. strobilaceus

Binomial name
- Dimerocostus strobilaceus Kuntze

= Dimerocostus strobilaceus =

Species of plant

Dimerocostus strobilaceus, called “Pinuue Barbat” by the Kuna people of Panama, is a species of plant native to Central and South Tropical America. It mainly grows in wet areas.

Dimerocostus strobilaceus grows up to 6 meters tall. The flower corolla may be white or yellow.

Dimerocostus strobilaceus is used for food and medicinal purposes. It has cardiovascular effects, and the Kuna people of Panama use it to treat hypertension and other cardiovascular diseases.

Dimerocostus strobilaceus is possibly naturalizing in Hawaii.
