= Mulfordia =

Mulfordia is the scientific name of two genera of organisms and may refer to:

- Mulfordia (fly), a genus of insects in the family Muscidae
- Mulfordia (plant), a genus of plants in the family Costaceae
