= Idioglossa bigemma =

Scientific classification
- Domain: Eukaryota
- Kingdom: Animalia
- Phylum: Arthropoda
- Class: Insecta
- Order: Lepidoptera
- Family: Epimarptidae
- Genus: Idioglossa
- Species: I. bigemma

Binomial name
- Idioglossa bigemma Walsingham, 1881

Moth species in family Batrachedridae

Idioglossa bigemma is a species of moth of the family Epimarptidae. It is known from Mauritius, Réunion and South Africa.

The wingspan is about 10 mm. The head and face of this species are shining silvery, palpi and antennae silvery. The forewings are ochreous, shining with silvery and brassy metallic scales.
