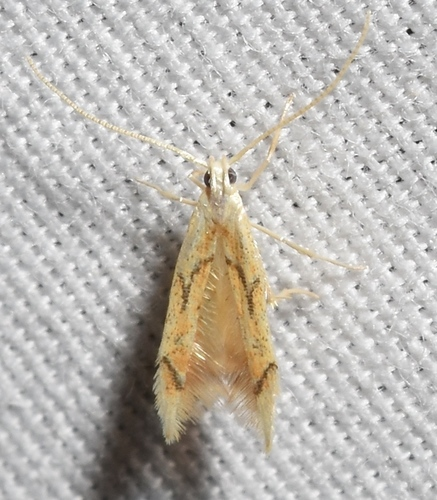

Scientific classification
- Kingdom: Animalia
- Phylum: Arthropoda
- Clade: Pancrustacea
- Class: Insecta
- Order: Lepidoptera
- Family: Epimarptidae
- Genus: Idioglossa
- Species: I. miraculosa

Binomial name
- Idioglossa miraculosa (Frey & Boll, 1878)

Synonyms
- Metamorpha miraculosa Frey & Boll, 1878; Idiostoma americella Walsingham, 1882

= Idioglossa miraculosa =

Moth species in family Batrachedridae

Idioglossa miraculosa is a moth of the family Epimarptidae. It was described by Frey and Boll in 1878. It is found in North America in the Southerastern United States, where it has been recorded from Illinois, Ohio, Tennessee, North Carolina, Texas and Florida.

The wingspan is about 10 mm. There are two or three generations per year. The larvae feed on Dichanthelium clandestinum. They skeletonize the leaves of their host plant.
