= Epimarptis philocoma =

Scientific classification
- Kingdom: Animalia
- Phylum: Arthropoda
- Class: Insecta
- Order: Lepidoptera
- Family: Epimarptidae
- Genus: Epimarptis
- Species: E. philocoma

Binomial name
- Epimarptis philocoma Meyrick, 1914

Synonyms
- [?] Epermenia philocoma (Meyrick, 1914)

Species of moth

Epermenia philocoma is a moth in the family Epimarptidae. It was described by Edward Meyrick in 1914. The species is found in India (Karnataka), with the original specimen from Uttara Kannada, Karwar.

== Description ==
From the original description, the wingspan is about 11 mm. The forewings are clear brassy yellow, the basal third of the costa sprinkled with dark fuscous and with an ochreous-brown triangular patch with violet reflections extending along the posterior half of the dorsum and termen to the apex, reaching more than halfway across the wings. The anterior edge is obliquely marked with two silvery-lilac spots sprinkled with blackish, representing the plical and first discal stigmata. There is a less marked, similar spot above the tornus, apparently representing the second discal stigma. The hindwings are grey.

The larvae have a reddish body and head. They have been recorded living in a white web on the midrib of an unknown plant, the web being on both sides of the leaf, kept off the surface by little pillars of excrement. The webs on either surface of the leaf are connected by holes through the leaf itself, and the larva uses these holes as a means of escaping observation. The cocoon is separate and made close to the midrib. It is oval and resembles a bird dropping.

Previously the taxon had entered to databases as the combination Epermenia philocoma but which may have no published justification, but if so would be a later recombination, but not in accordance with several studies that treat Epimarptis as a valid genus.
