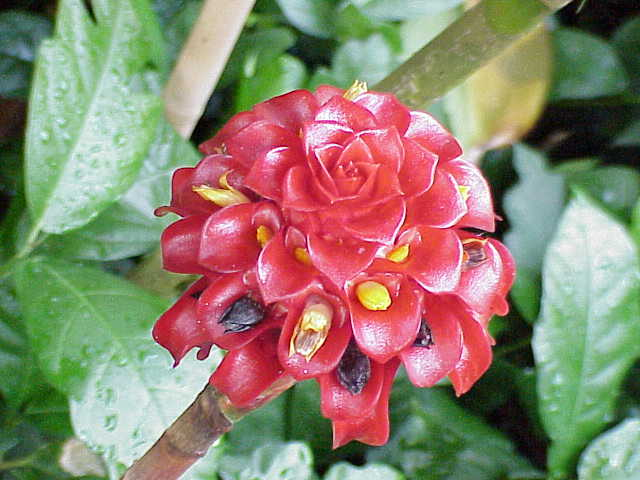

Conservation status
- Least Concern (NCA)

Scientific classification
- Kingdom: Plantae
- Clade: Tracheophytes
- Clade: Angiosperms
- Clade: Monocots
- Clade: Commelinids
- Order: Zingiberales
- Family: Costaceae
- Genus: Tapeinochilos
- Species: T. ananassae

Binomial name
- Tapeinochilos ananassae (Hassk.) K.Schum.

Synonyms
- Costus ananassae Hassk.; Costus pungens Teijsm. & Binn.; Tapeinochilos pungens (Teijsm. & Binn.) Miq.; Tapeinochilos teysmannianus Warb.; Tapeinochilos australis K.Schum.; Tapeinochilos pungens var. queenslandiae F.M.Bailey; Tapeinochilos queenslandiae (F.M.Bailey) K.Schum.; Tapeinochilos pungens var. teysmannianus (Warb.) Valeton

= Tapeinochilos ananassae =

Species of herb

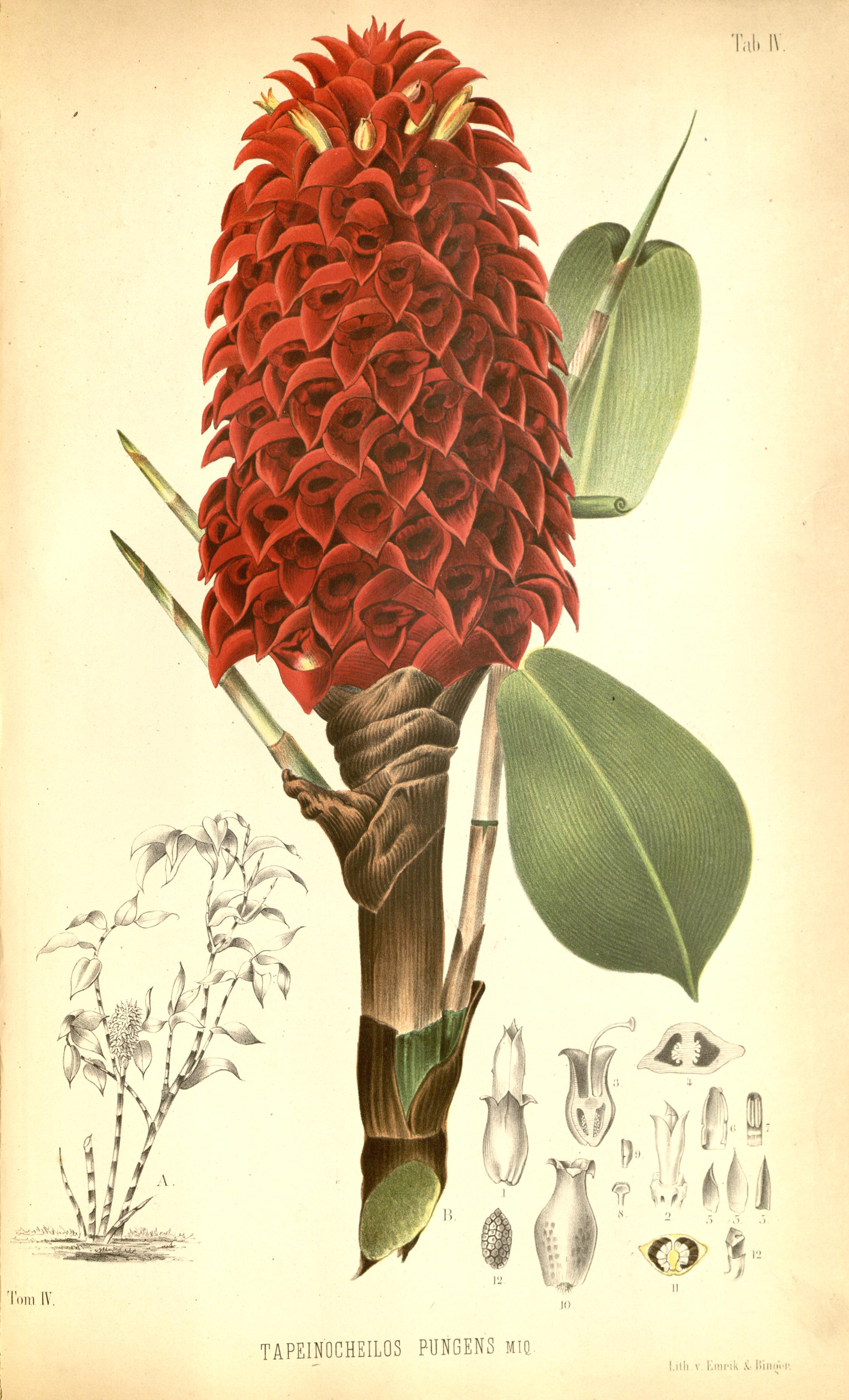
T. ananassae in Annales Musei Botanici Lugduno-Batavi.

Tapeinochilos ananassae, also known as backscratcher ginger, torch ginger, or (in Hawaii) Indonesian wax ginger, is an evergreen herb in the family Costaceae described as a species in 1866. It is native to New Guinea, the Indonesian province of Maluku, and the Australian state of Queensland. It is a perennial growing up to 2.4 m (8 ft) tall and a spread of up to 2.1 m (7 ft). The inflorescence is a cylindrical array of stiff, bright red bracts enclosing emergent yellow flowers.
