= Epimarptis septicodes =

Scientific classification
- Domain: Eukaryota
- Kingdom: Animalia
- Phylum: Arthropoda
- Class: Insecta
- Order: Lepidoptera
- Family: Epimarptidae
- Genus: Epimarptis
- Species: E. septicodes

Binomial name
- Epimarptis septicodes Meyrick, 1917

Synonyms
- [?] Epermenia septicodes (Meyrick, 1917)

Species of moth

Epimarptis septicodes is a moth in the family Epimarptidae. It was described by Edward Meyrick in 1917. It is found in Sri Lanka.

== Description ==
From the original description, the wingspan is about 14 millimetres (0.55 in). The forewings are deep yellow ochreous, the base of the costa suffused with blackish grey, and with some scattered scales along it to the middle. There is a narrow irregular blackish-grey fascia from the middle of the dorsum towards the middle of the costa, but not reaching it, as well as a transverse blackish-grey spot from the tornus not reaching the costa, and another crossing the wing midway between this and the apex, connected with it by a terminal streak. The hindwings are grey.

Previously the taxon had entered to databases as the combination Epermenia septicodes but which may have no published justification, but if so would be a later recombination, but not in accordance with several studies that treat Epimarptis as a valid genus.
