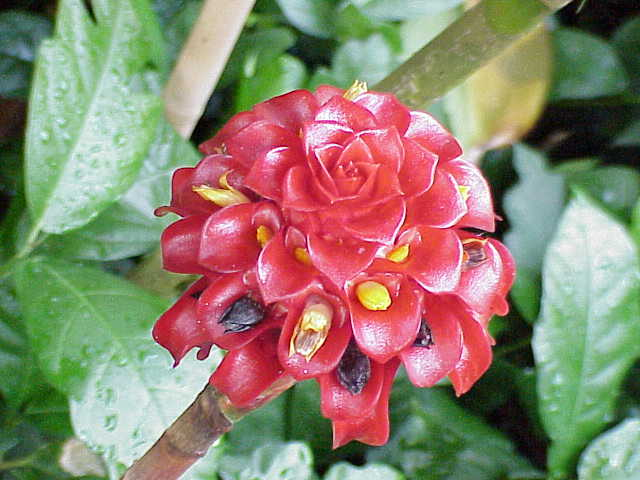
- Tapeinochilos ananassae

Scientific classification
- Kingdom: Plantae
- Clade: Embryophytes
- Clade: Tracheophytes
- Clade: Spermatophytes
- Clade: Angiosperms
- Clade: Monocots
- Clade: Commelinids
- Order: Zingiberales
- Family: Costaceae
- Genus: Tapeinochilos; Miq.

Synonyms
- Tapeinocheilos Miq., spelling variant; Tubutubua Post & Kuntze

= Tapeinochilos =

Genus of plants

Tapeinochilos is a group of plants in the Costaceae described as a genus in 1869. It is native to Queensland, Papuasia, and the Indonesian Province of Maluku. Centered in Papua New Guinea, only three of the approximately 16 species occur outside of the country.

== Species ==
- Tapeinochilos acaulis K.Schum. - Papua New Guinea
- Tapeinochilos ananassae (Hassk.) K.Schum. - Queensland, New Guinea, Maluku
- Tapeinochilos beccarii K.Schum. - Western New Guinea
- Tapeinochilos dahlii K.Schum - Bismarck Archipelago
- Tapeinochilos densus K.Schum. - Papua New Guinea
- Tapeinochilos fissilabrum Gagnep. - Bismarck Archipelago
- Tapeinochilos globiceps K.Schum. - Papua New Guinea
- Tapeinochilos hollrungii K.Schum. - Papua New Guinea
- Tapeinochilos lauterbachii K.Schum. - Papua New Guinea
- Tapeinochilos naumannii Warb. - Papua New Guinea
- Tapeinochilos piniformis Warb. - Papua New Guinea
- Tapeinochilos pubescens Ridl. - Western New Guinea
- Tapeinochilos recurvatus K.Schum. - Papua New Guinea
- Tapeinochilos spectabilis K.Schum. - New Guinea
- Tapeinochilos tomentosus Valeton - New Guinea
- Tapeinochilos versteegii Valeton - New Guinea

== Gallery ==
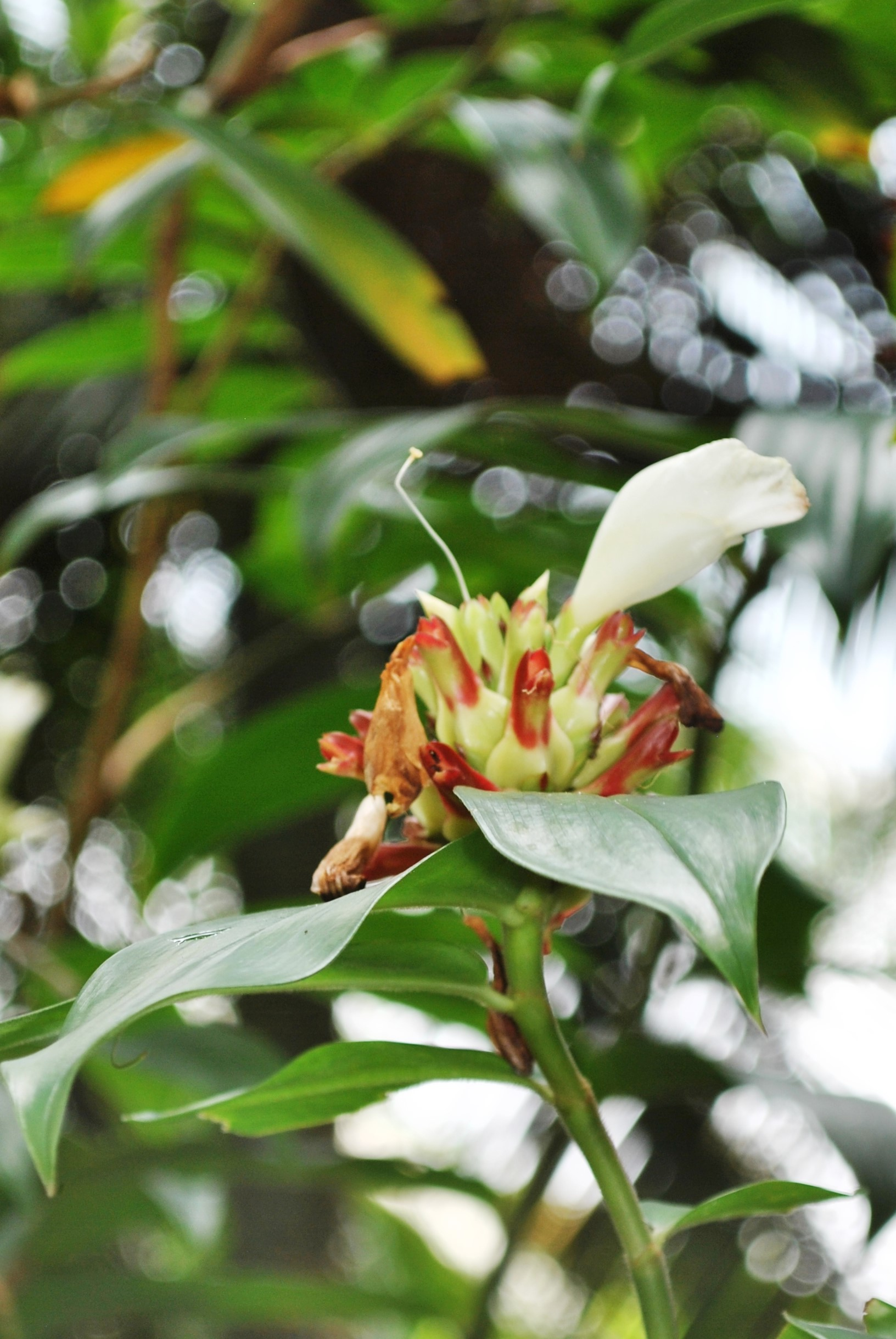
Tapeinochilos recurvatus
