= Alpinia elegans =

Scientific classification
- Kingdom: Plantae
- Clade: Tracheophytes
- Clade: Angiosperms
- Clade: Monocots
- Clade: Commelinids
- Order: Zingiberales
- Family: Zingiberaceae
- Genus: Alpinia
- Species: A. elegans

Binomial name
- Alpinia elegans (C. Presl) K. Schum., 1899

Synonyms
- Alpinia gigantea Fern.-Vill.; Alpinia gracilis (Blanco) Rolfe; Hellenia gracilis (Blanco) Hausskn.; Kolowratia elegans C.Presl; Languas elegans (C.Presl) Burkill; Renealmia gracilis Blanco

Species of flowering plant

Alpinia elegans is a species of flowering plants in the ginger family, Zingiberaceae. It is found in Asia (the Philippines, Indonesia).
