= Epimarptis =

Scientific classification
- Kingdom: Animalia
- Phylum: Arthropoda
- Clade: Pancrustacea
- Class: Insecta
- Order: Lepidoptera
- Family: Epimarptidae
- Genus: Epimarptis; Walsingham, 1881

Species
- See text

Genus of moths

Epimarptis is a genus of moths of the family Epimarptidae, it was previously part of Batrachedridae or others (see below).

== Taxonomy ==
The genus was created by Meyrick, 1914 for the species Epermenia philocoma from India. The genus remained monotypic until three years later, when Meyrick, 1917 added a second species, this time from Sri Lanka. Here, Meyrick decided to reclassify the genus in the family Epermeniidae. Finally, Meyrick, 1931 described a third species from Assam, eastern India. The genus remained with just three species from the Indian subcontinent until Kazuhiro Sugisima described a fourth new species from Japan in 2004. Whilst specimens of this Japanese moth had been collected numerous times since at least 1975, they had remained without precise identification.

== Species ==
The genus contains the following species:

- Epimarptis Meyrick, 1914
  - Epimarptis hiranoi Sugisima, 2004 - Japan (Honshu)
  - Epimarptis isoloxa Meyrick, 1931 - India (Assam)
  - Epimarptis philocoma Meyrick, 1914 - India (Karnataka, possibly Mumbai)
  - Epimarptis septicodes Meyrick, 1917 - Sri Lanka (Maskeliya)

== Ecology ==
See comments on the family Epimarptidae, but also see notes under Epimarptis philocoma
