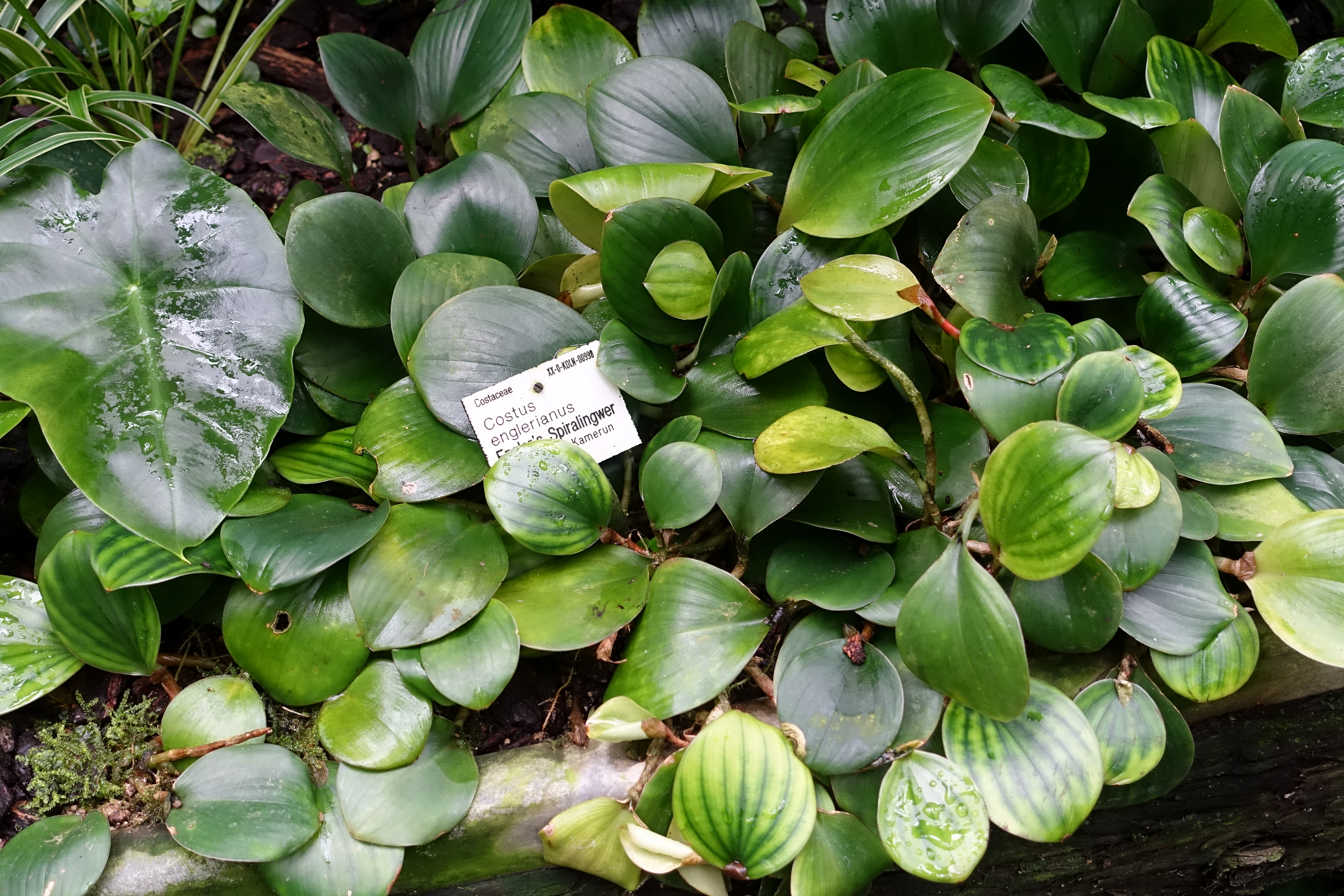
- Paracostus englerianus

Scientific classification
- Kingdom: Plantae
- Clade: Embryophytes
- Clade: Tracheophytes
- Clade: Angiosperms
- Clade: Monocots
- Clade: Commelinids
- Order: Zingiberales
- Family: Costaceae
- Genus: Paracostus; C.D.Specht

= Paracostus =

Genus of flowering plants

Paracostus is a group of plants in the family Costaceae described as a genus in 2006. It is native to Borneo and to tropical Africa.

== Species ==
Plants of the World Online lists two accepted species:

- Paracostus englerianus (K.Schum.) C.D.Specht - Ghana, Ivory Coast, Nigeria, Cameroon, Congo Republic, Gabon, Islands of the Gulf of Guinea
- Paracostus paradoxus (K.Schum.) C.D.Specht - Borneo
