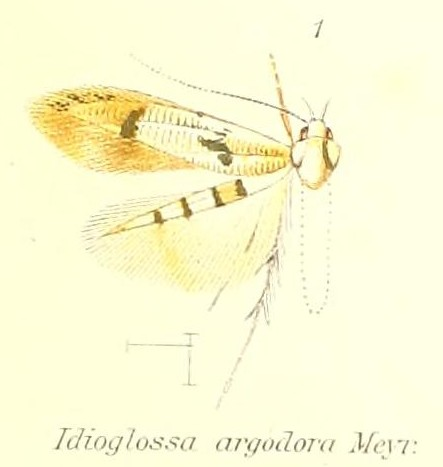

Scientific classification
- Domain: Eukaryota
- Kingdom: Animalia
- Phylum: Arthropoda
- Class: Insecta
- Order: Lepidoptera
- Family: Epimarptidae
- Genus: Idioglossa
- Species: I. argodora

Binomial name
- Idioglossa argodora Meyrick, 1913

= Idioglossa argodora =

Moth species in family Batrachedridae

Idioglossa argodora is a species of moth of the family Epimarptidae. It is known from India.

The wingspan is about 10 mm.
