= Parahellenia =

Scientific classification
- Kingdom: Plantae
- Clade: Tracheophytes
- Clade: Angiosperms
- Clade: Monocots
- Clade: Commelinids
- Order: Zingiberales
- Family: Costaceae
- Genus: Parahellenia; N.H.Xia, Juan Chen, L.Y.Zeng & S.Jin Zeng

Genus of flowering plants

Parahellenia is a genus of flowering plants in the family Costaceae. It includes nine species native to tropical Asia, ranging from southern China through Indochina to western Malesia (Peninsular Malaysia, Borneo, Sumatra, and Java).

== Species ==
Nine species are accepted.

- Parahellenia borneensis (A.D.Poulsen) N.H.Xia, Juan Chen & S.Jin Zeng
- Parahellenia candida (Škorničk., Böhmová & H.Ð.Trần) N.H.Xia & Juan Chen
- Parahellenia globosa (Blume) N.H.Xia, Juan Chen & S.Jin Zeng
- Parahellenia malipoensis Juan Chen, L.Y.Zeng, S.Jin Zeng & N.H.Xia
- Parahellenia mizoramensis Lalfakawma, S.D.Khomdram & S.D.Yumkham
- Parahellenia mulus (Meekiong, Ipor & Tawan) Juan Chen, N.H.Xia & L.Y.Zeng
- Parahellenia tonkinensis (Gagnep.) Juan Chen, N.H.Xia, L.Y.Zeng & S.Jin Zeng
- Parahellenia trongduyi Juan Chen, V.C.Nguyen, K.S.Nguyen & N.H.Xia
- Parahellenia yunnanensis S.Jin Zeng, N.H.Xia, L.Y.Zeng & Juan Chen
