= Alpinia aquatica =

Scientific classification
- Kingdom: Plantae
- Clade: Tracheophytes
- Clade: Angiosperms
- Clade: Monocots
- Clade: Commelinids
- Order: Zingiberales
- Family: Zingiberaceae
- Genus: Alpinia
- Species: A. aquatica

Binomial name
- Alpinia aquatica (Retz.) Roscoe

Species of flowering plant

Alpinia aquatica, aquatic ginger, is a species of ginger native from South India to Western Malesia. It was first described by Anders Jahan Retzius and renamed by William Roscoe.
