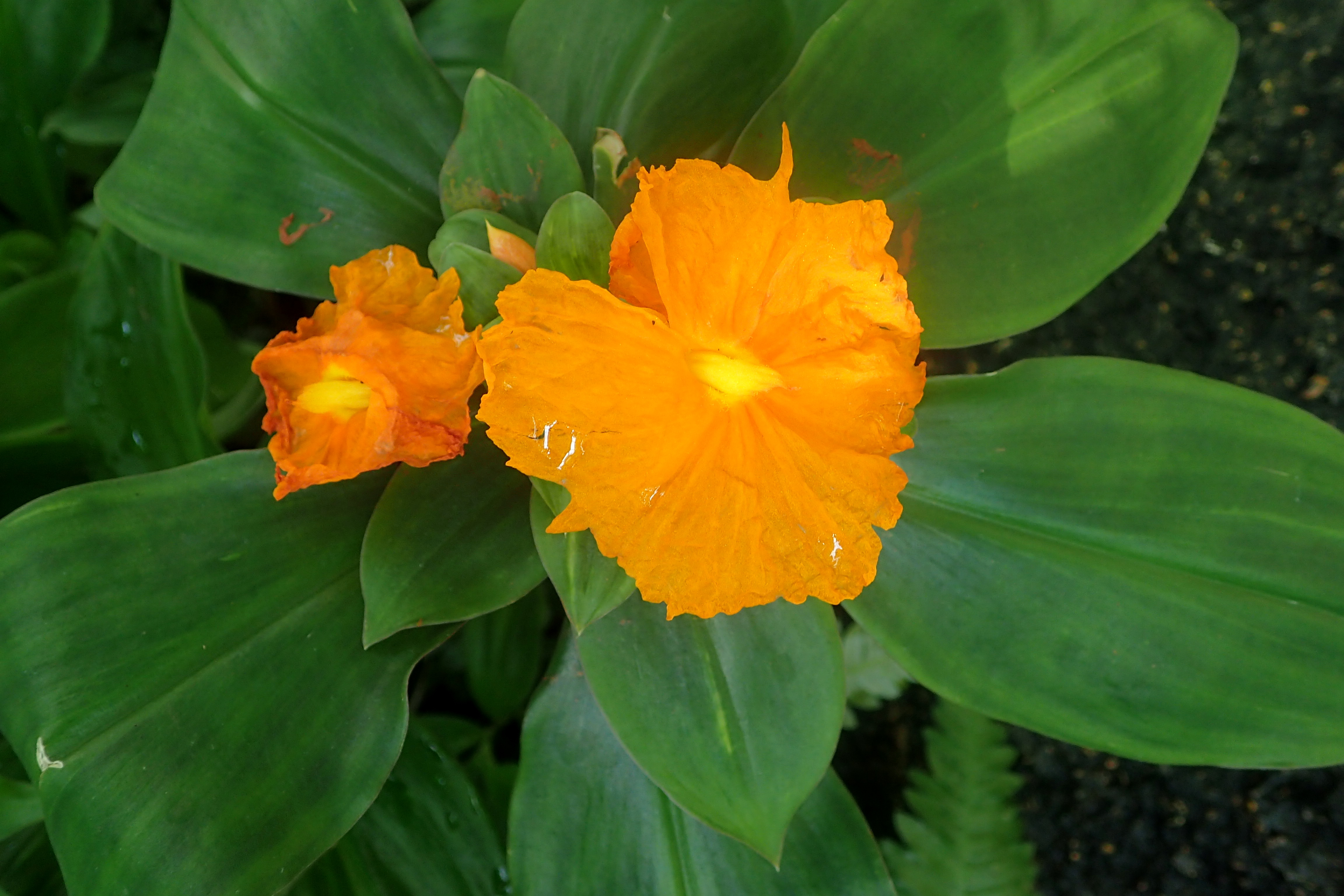
- Chamaecostus cuspidatus

Scientific classification
- Kingdom: Plantae
- Clade: Tracheophytes
- Clade: Angiosperms
- Clade: Monocots
- Clade: Commelinids
- Order: Zingiberales
- Family: Costaceae
- Genus: Chamaecostus; C.D.Specht & D.W.Stev.

= Chamaecostus =

Genus of flowering plants

Chamaecostus is a group of flowering plants in the Costaceae described as a genus in 2006. It is endemic to South America.

Species

- Chamaecostus congestiflorus - Venezuela, N Brazil, Guyana, Suriname, French Guiana
- Chamaecostus curcumoides - French Guiana
- Chamaecostus cuspidatus - E Brazil
- Chamaecostus fragilis - Colombia, N Brazil
- Chamaecostus fusiformis - Pará
- Chamaecostus lanceolatus - Colombia, Venezuela, Brazil, Guyana, Suriname, French Guiana
- Chamaecostus subsessilis - Brazil, Bolivia
