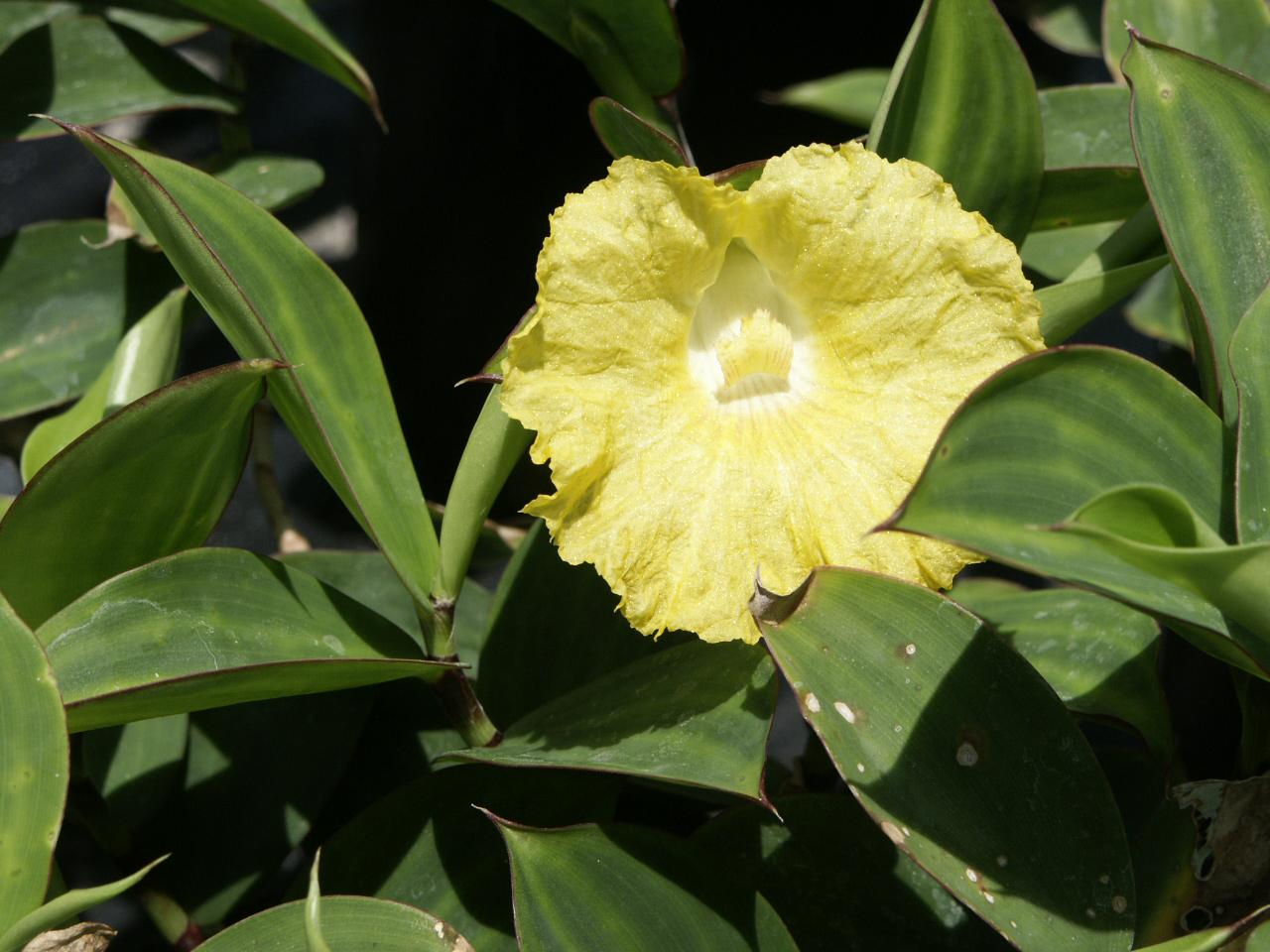

Scientific classification
- Kingdom: Plantae
- Clade: Tracheophytes
- Clade: Angiosperms
- Clade: Monocots
- Clade: Commelinids
- Order: Zingiberales
- Family: Costaceae
- Genus: Monocostus; K.Schum.
- Species: M. uniflorus

Binomial name
- Monocostus uniflorus (Poepp. ex Petersen) Maas

Synonyms
- Costus uniflorus Poepp. ex Petersen; Dimerocostus uniflorus (Poepp. ex Petersen) K.Schum.; Monocostus ulei K.Schum.

= Monocostus =

Species of plant

Monocostus is a group of plants in the Costaceae described as a genus in 1904. There is only one known species, Monocostus uniflorus, endemic to Peru.
