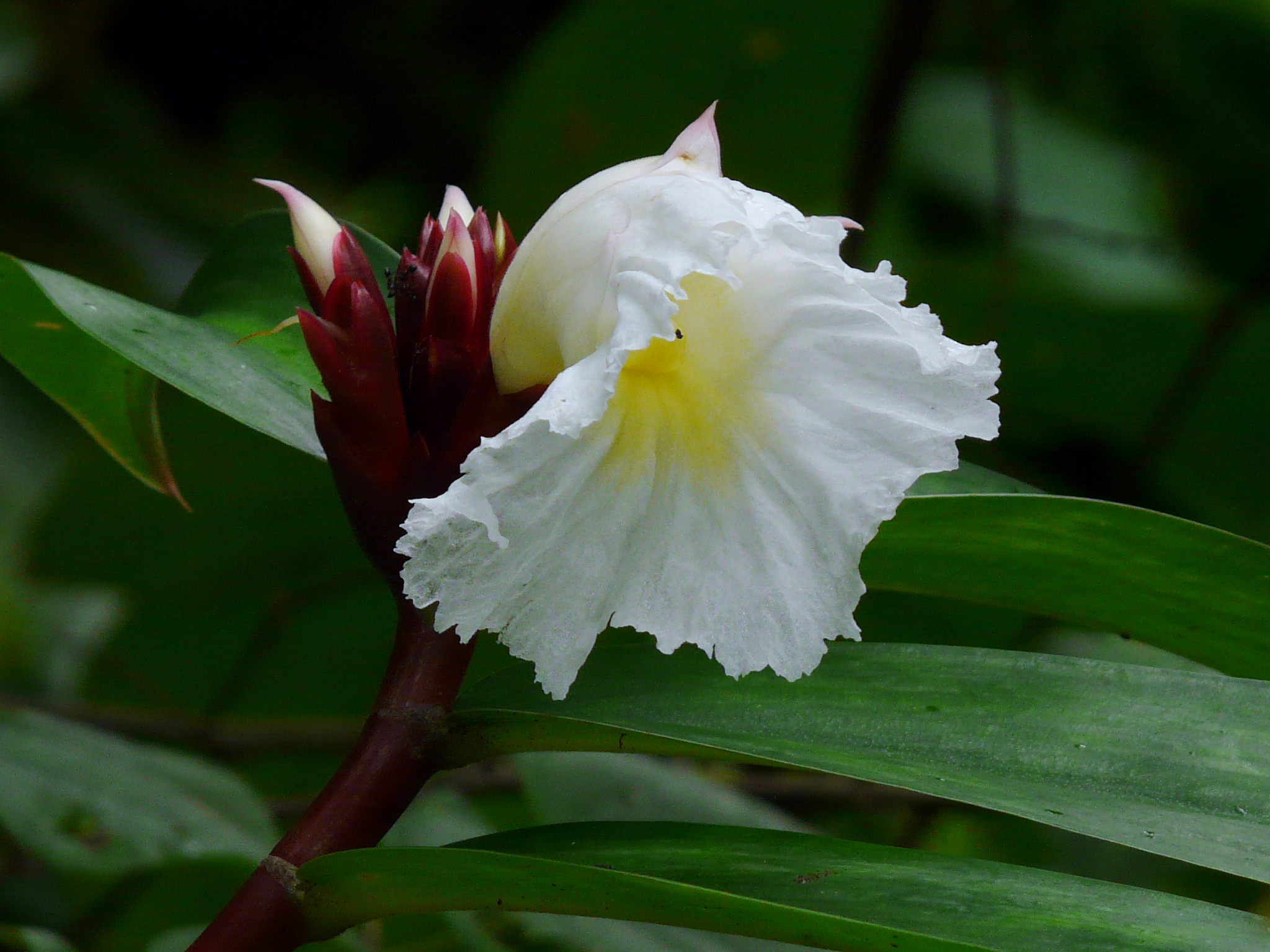
- Flower; Tungareshwar Wildlife Sanctuary, Maharashtra, India
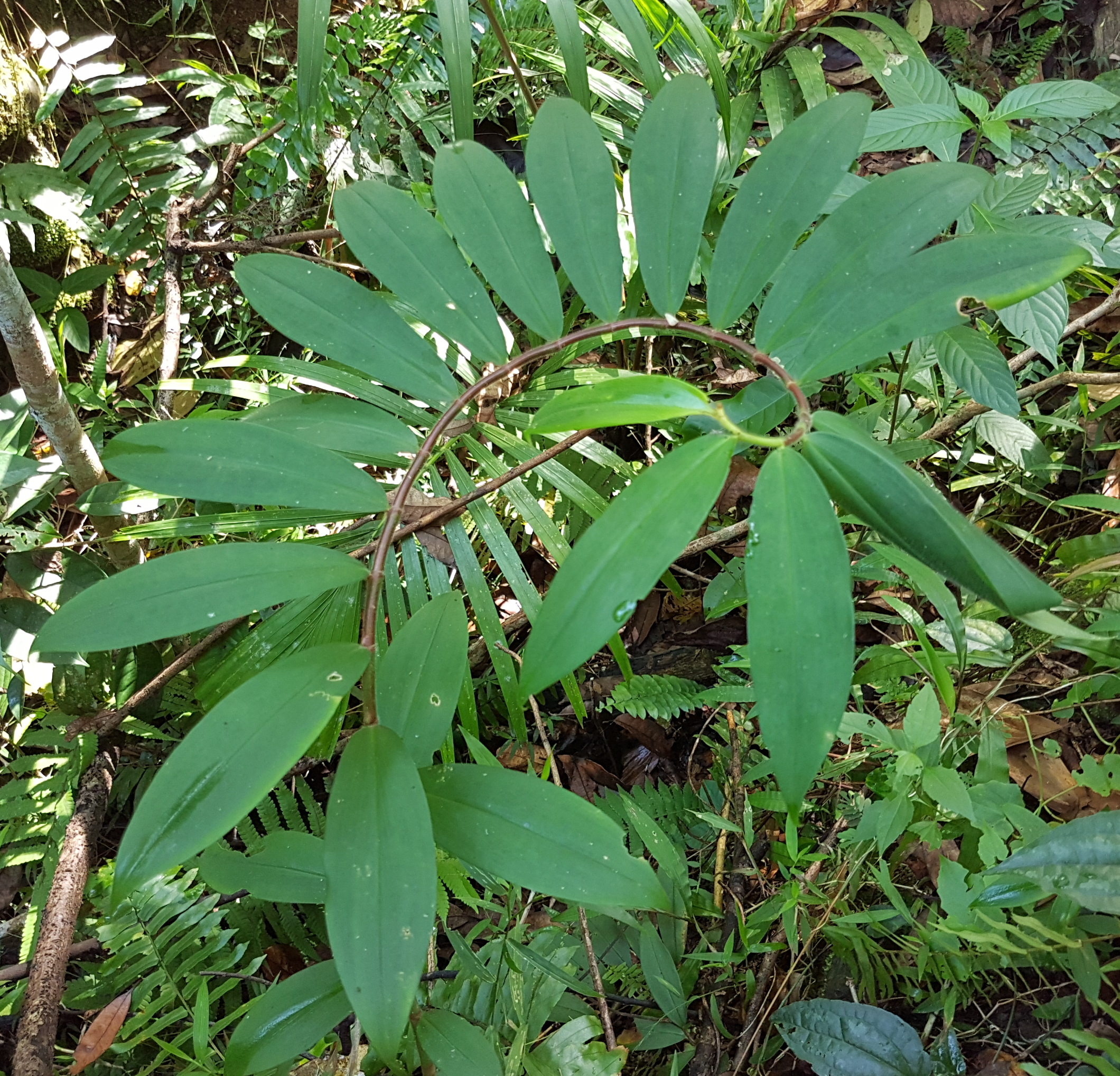
- Foliage; Bukidnon, Philippines

Conservation status
- Least Concern (IUCN 3.1)

Scientific classification
- Kingdom: Plantae
- Clade: Embryophytes
- Clade: Tracheophytes
- Clade: Spermatophytes
- Clade: Angiosperms
- Clade: Monocots
- Clade: Commelinids
- Order: Zingiberales
- Family: Costaceae
- Genus: Hellenia
- Species: H. speciosa

Binomial name
- Hellenia speciosa (J.Koenig) S.R.Dutta

Synonyms
- 38 synonyms: Amomum arboreum Lour.; Amomum hirsutum Lam.; Banksea speciosa J.Koenig (1783) (basionym); Cardamomum arboreum (Lour.) Kuntze; Cheilocostus potierae (F.Muell.) M.G.Harr. & Zich; Cheilocostus speciosus (J.Koenig) C.D.Specht; Costus angustifolius Ker Gawl.; Costus argyrophyllus Wall.; Costus crispiflorus Stokes; Costus foeniculaceus Noronha; Costus formosanus Nakai; Costus glaber (K.Schum.) Merr.; Costus glabratus Rchb.; Costus hirsutus Blume; Costus lamingtonii F.M.Bailey; Costus loureiroi Horan.; Costus nipalensis Roscoe; Costus potierae F.Muell.; Costus sericeus Blume; Costus speciosus (J.Koenig) Sm.; Costus speciosus var. angustifolius Ker Gawl.; Costus speciosus var. argyrophyllus Wall. ex Baker; Costus speciosus var. dilnavaziae M.R.Almeida & S.M.Almeida; Costus speciosus var. formosanus (Nakai) S.S.Ying; Costus speciosus var. glaber K.Schum.; Costus speciosus var. hirsutus (Blume) K.Schum.; Costus speciosus var. leocalyx Nakai; Costus speciosus var. nipalensis (Roscoe) Baker; Costus speciosus var. sericeus (Blume) K.Schum.; Costus spicatus var. pubescens Griseb.; Costus vaginalis Salisb.; Hellenia grandiflora Retz.; Hellenia speciosa var. dilnavaziae (M.R.Almeida & S.M.Almeida) S.R.Dutta; Kaempferia speciosa (J.Koenig) Thunb.; Planera speciosa (J.Koenig) Giseke; Pyxa speciosa (J.Koenig) M.R.Almeida; Pyxa speciosa var. dilnavaziae (M.R.Almeida & S.M.Almeida) M.R.Almeida; Tsiana speciosa (J.Koenig) J.F.Gmel.

= Hellenia speciosa =

Crêpe ginger

Species of flowering plant

Hellenia speciosa, or crêpe ginger, is a species of flowering plant in the family Costaceae. It is a herbaceous perennial rhizomatous geophyte which is also known by Cheilocostus speciosus and other botanical names.

It is native to southeast Asia and surrounding regions, from India to southern China, Taiwan, Indochina, Malesia, New Guinea, the Solomon Islands, and Queensland, Australia. It is especially common on the Greater Sunda Islands in Indonesia. It is also reportedly naturalised in Puerto Rico, Mauritius, Réunion, Fiji, Hawaii, Costa Rica, Belize, Melanesia, Micronesia, and the West Indies. It is widely cultivated as an ornamental.

== Description ==
Hellenia speciosa and other members of the Costaceae differ from gingers by having only one row of spirally arranged leaves. The species reproduces vegetatively by rhizome, and birds disperse the seeds when they feed on the fruits. The flowers have only two stamens, one is functional, with a single locule, while the other is petaloid, forming a white, bell-shaped trumpet around the fertile one. The true petals, also white, are small. The plant can reach 2 metres (6 ft 7 in) in height.

This plant is cultivated in South Asia and Southeast Asia for its medicinal uses, and is cultivated elsewhere as an ornamental. In some areas Hellenia speciosa is introduced and has become an invasive species.

== Habitat ==
The species' habitat is low-lying areas in tropical forests and roadside ditches. Flowering starts after onset of the rainy season.

== Taxonomy ==
In Australia the name Cheilocostus potierae is recognised by both the national and the Queensland herbariums as being distinct from Hellenia speciosa.

== Ecology ==
Caterpillars of the restricted demon butterfly (Notocrypta curvifascia) feed on crêpe ginger.

== Human relevance ==
The plant has many historical uses in Ayurveda, where the rhizome has been used to treat fever, rash, asthma, bronchitis, and intestinal worms. It is mentioned in the Kama Sutra as an ingredient in a cosmetic to be used on the eyelashes to increase sexual attractiveness. It is used to treat kidney problems and other urinary problems in Mizo Traditional Medicine. It was used as a traditional medicine by Malays when evil spirits have possessed a body, as well as for the treatment of high fever, smallpox and as a purgative.

The crêpe ginger is also a source of diosgenin, a compound used for the commercial production of various steroids, such as progesterone.

Several parts of the plant are eaten, including the flowers, leaves, shoots, and rhizomes.

== Gallery ==
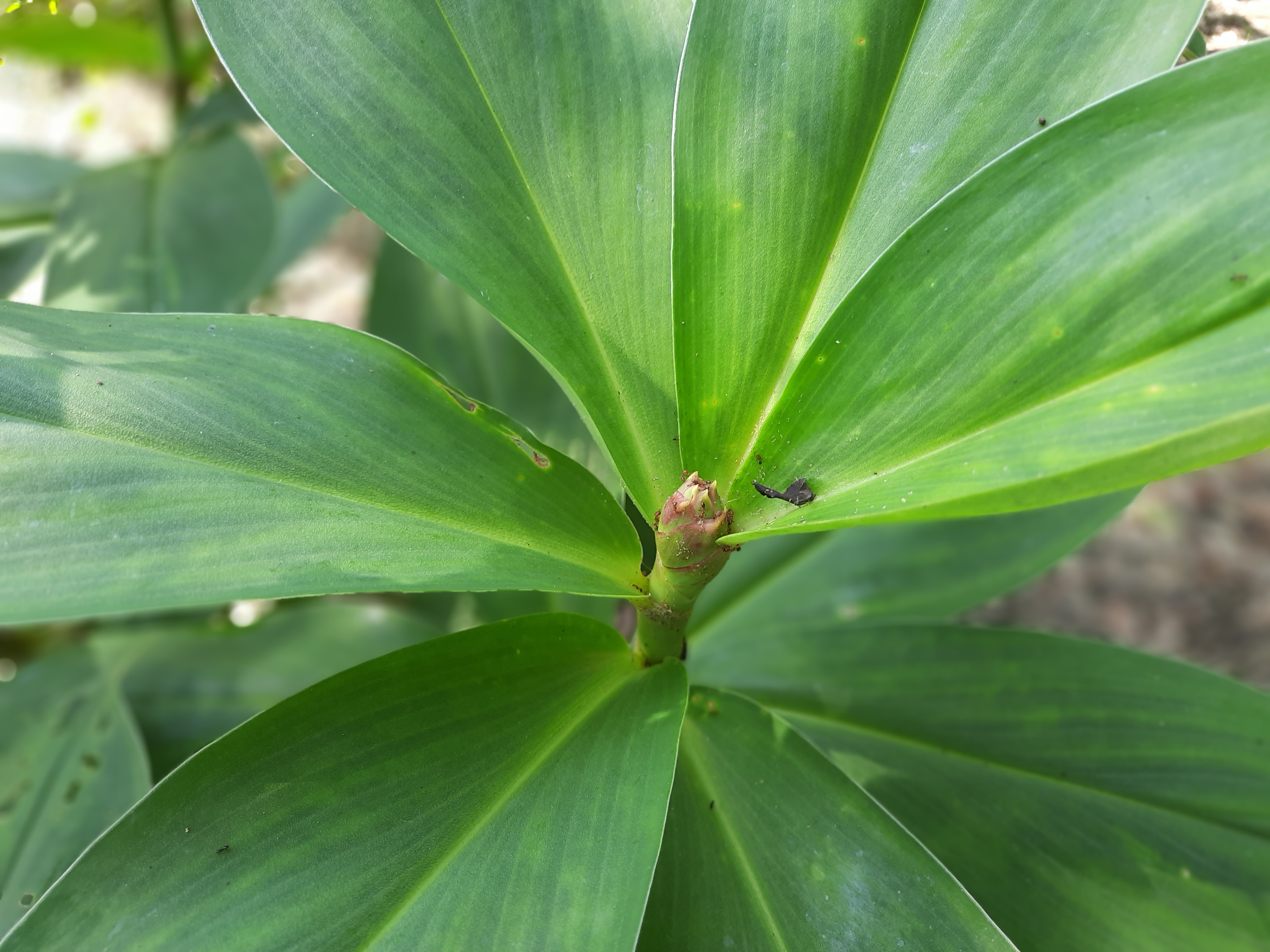
Bud

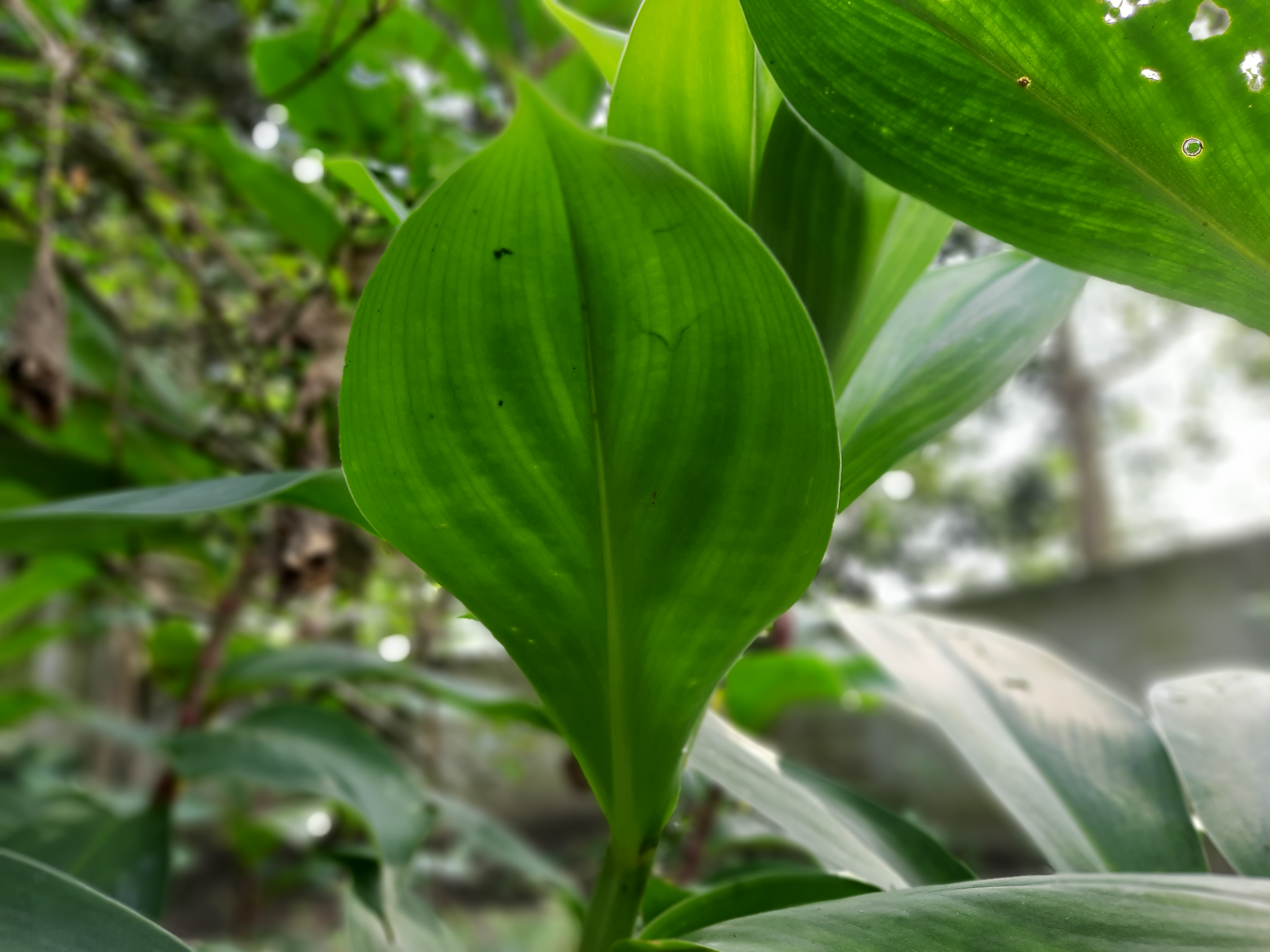
Leaf from back side

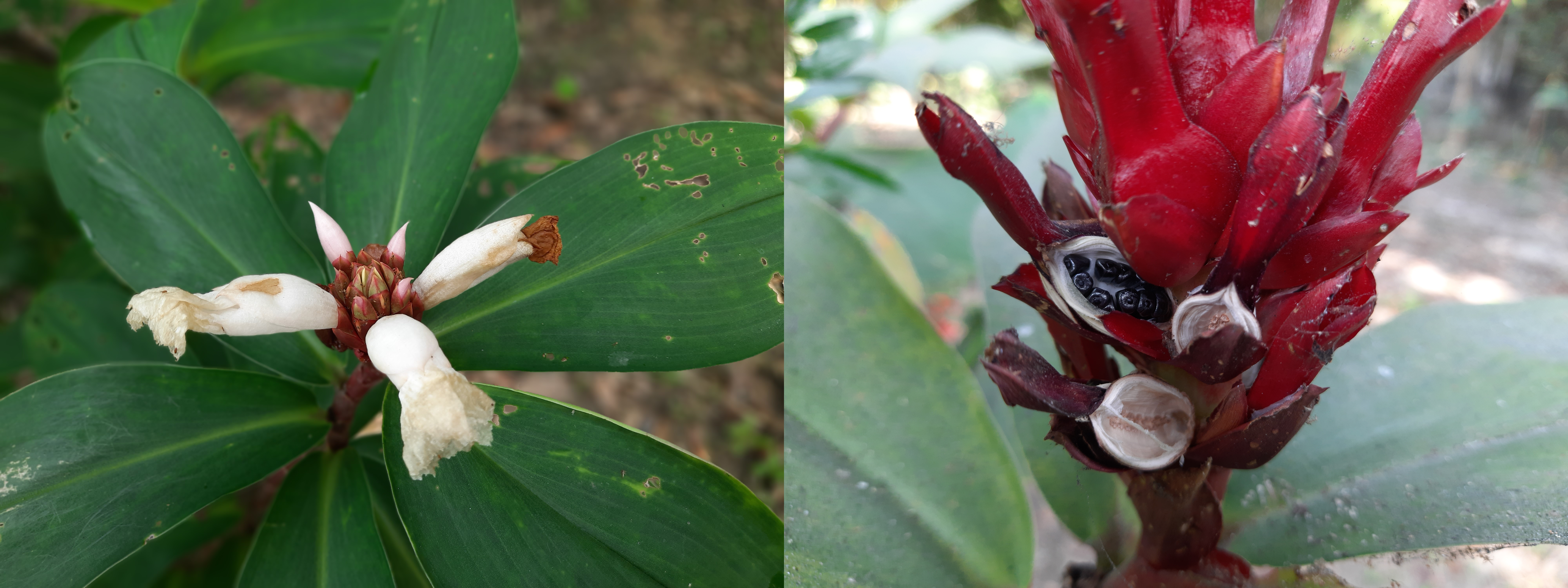
Transformation from flower to seeds

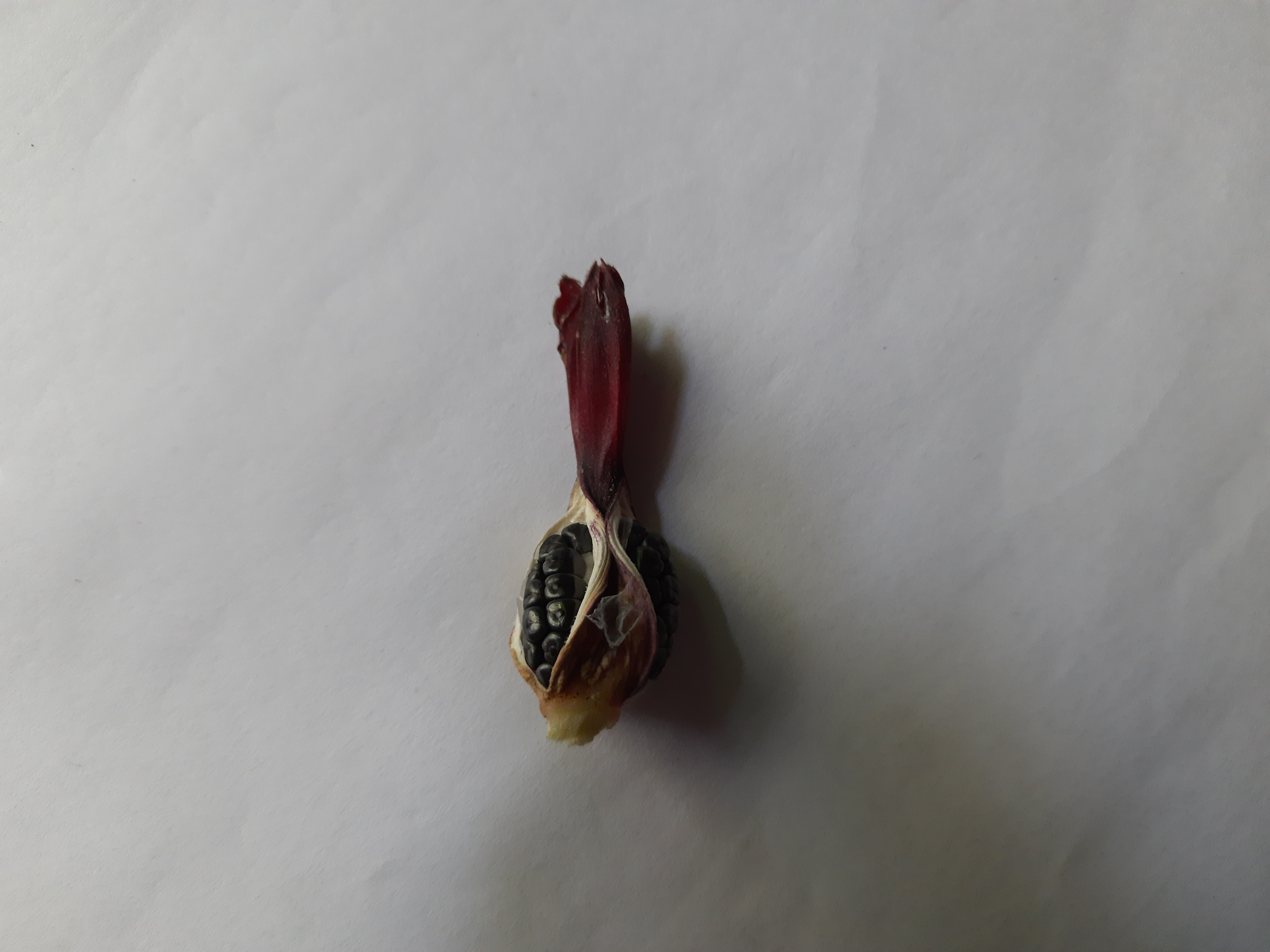
Seeds

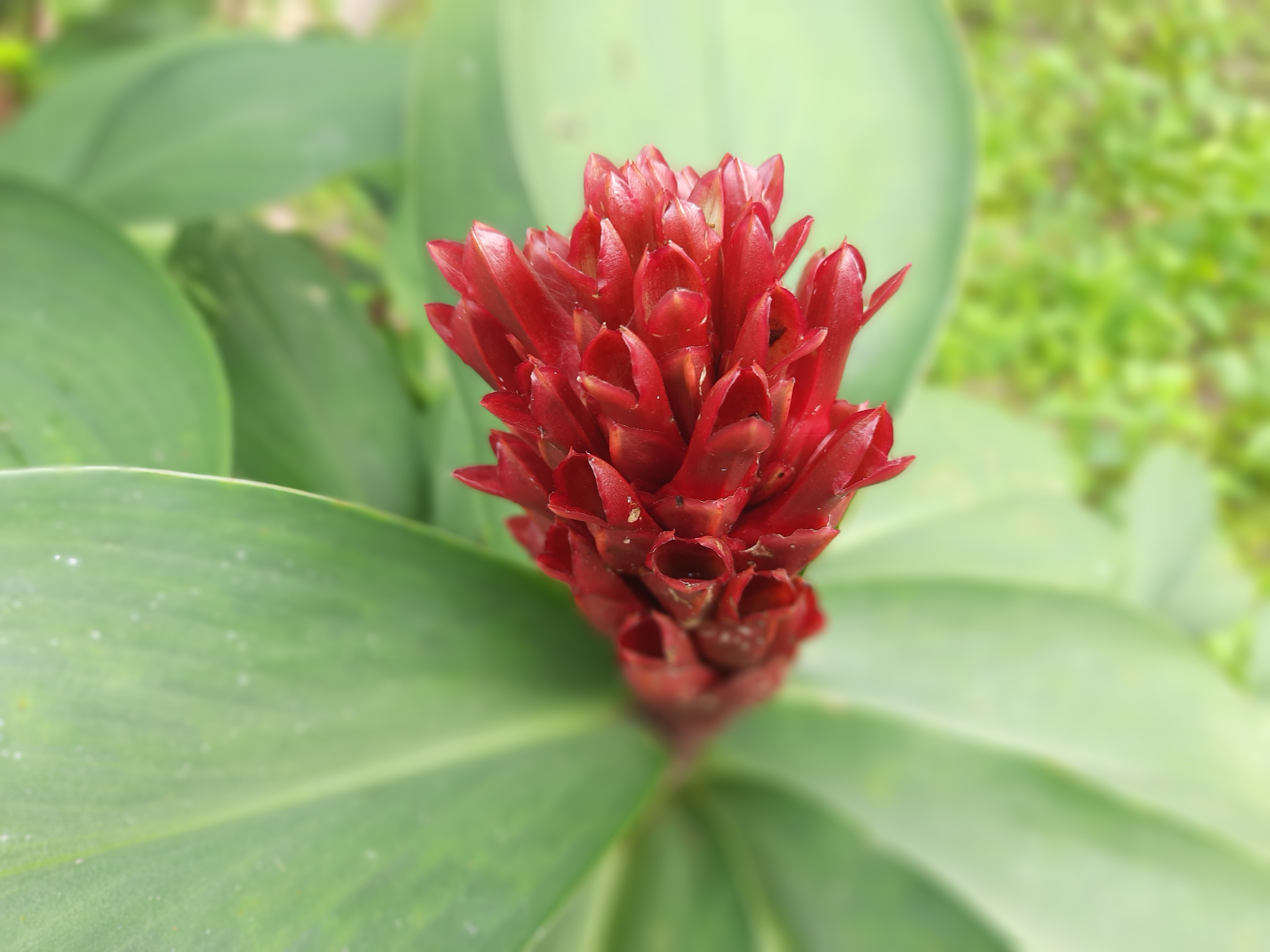
Inflorescence after flowers died

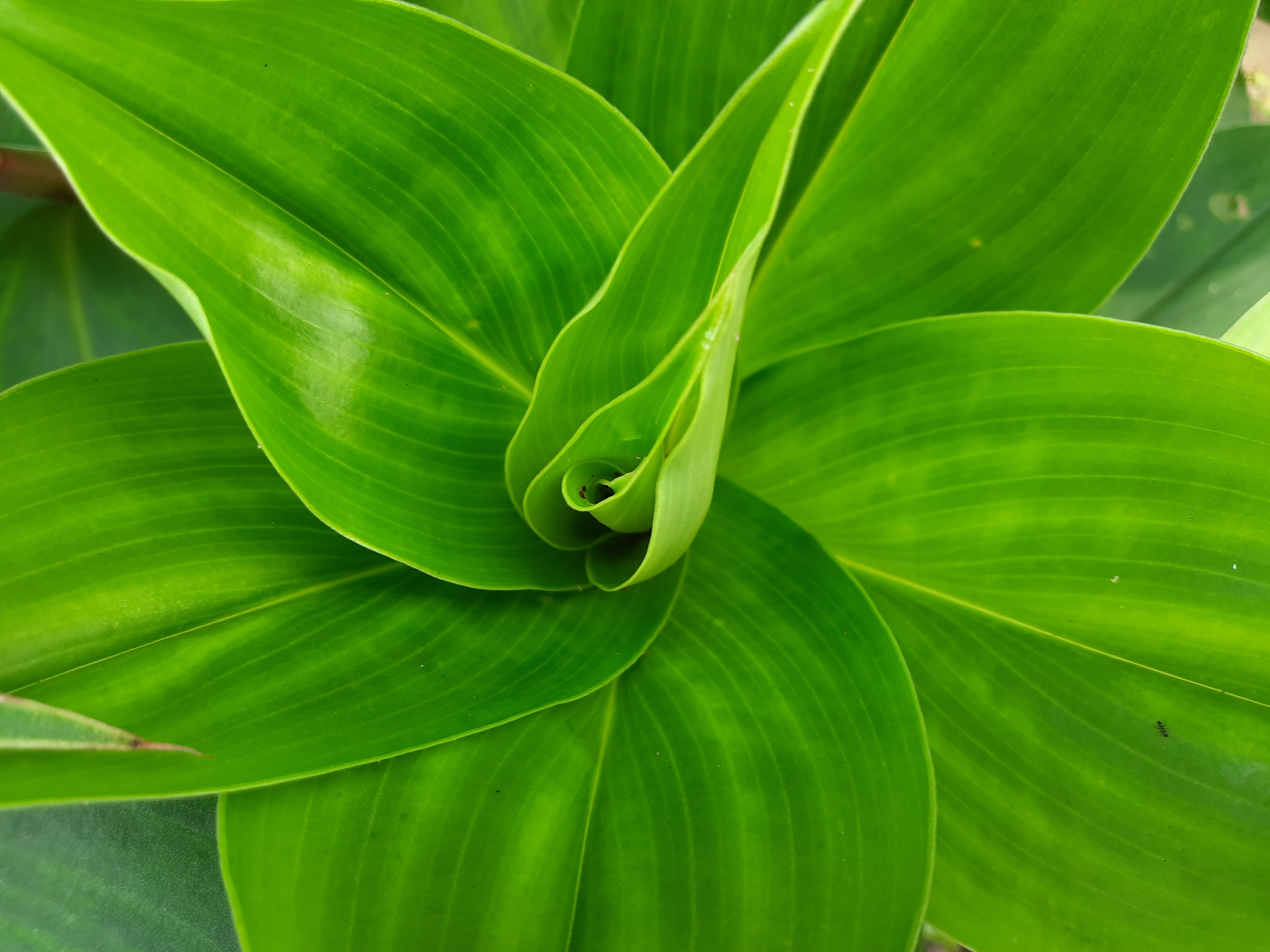
New leaf

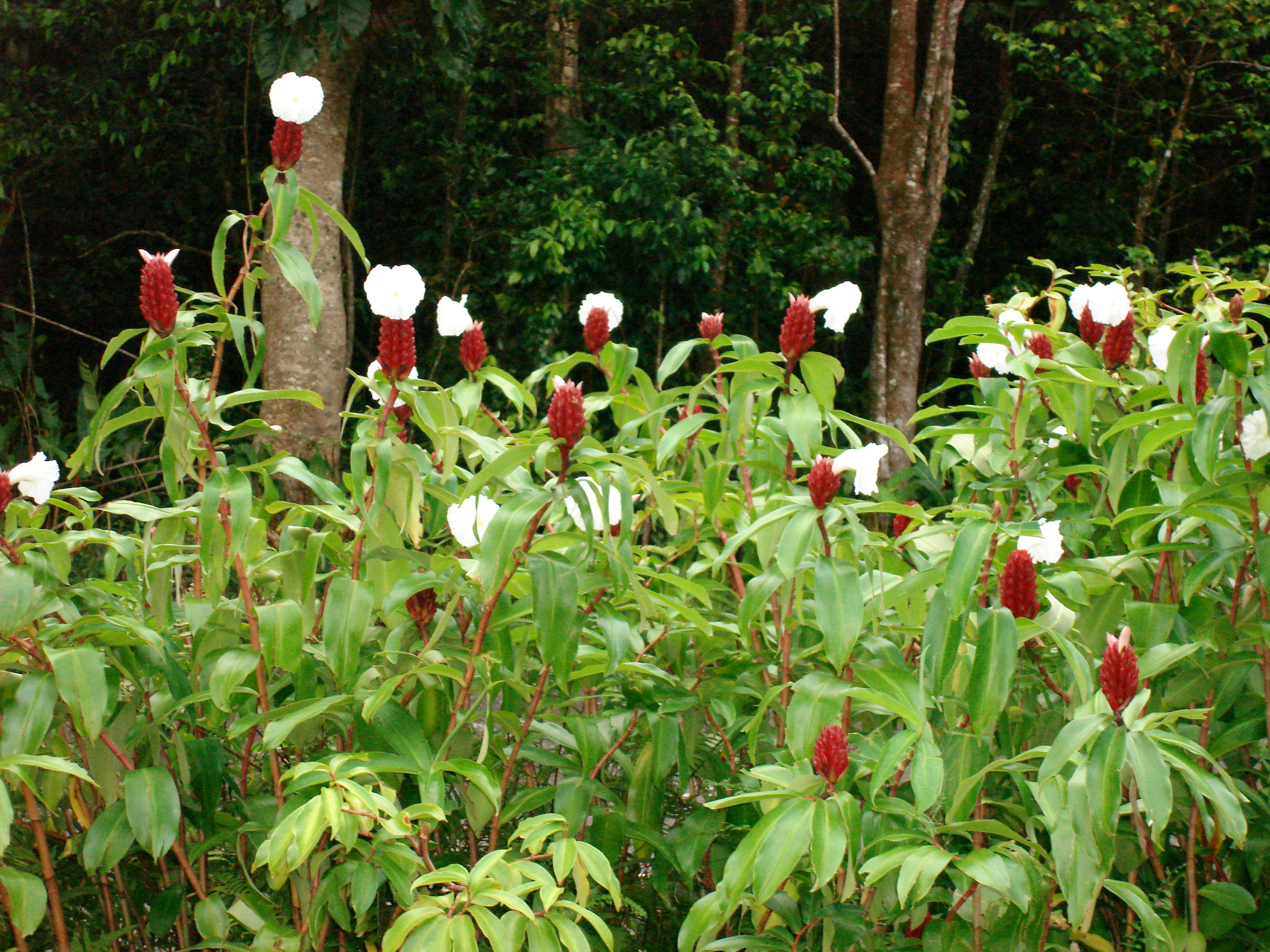
In Basse Terre, Guadeloupe

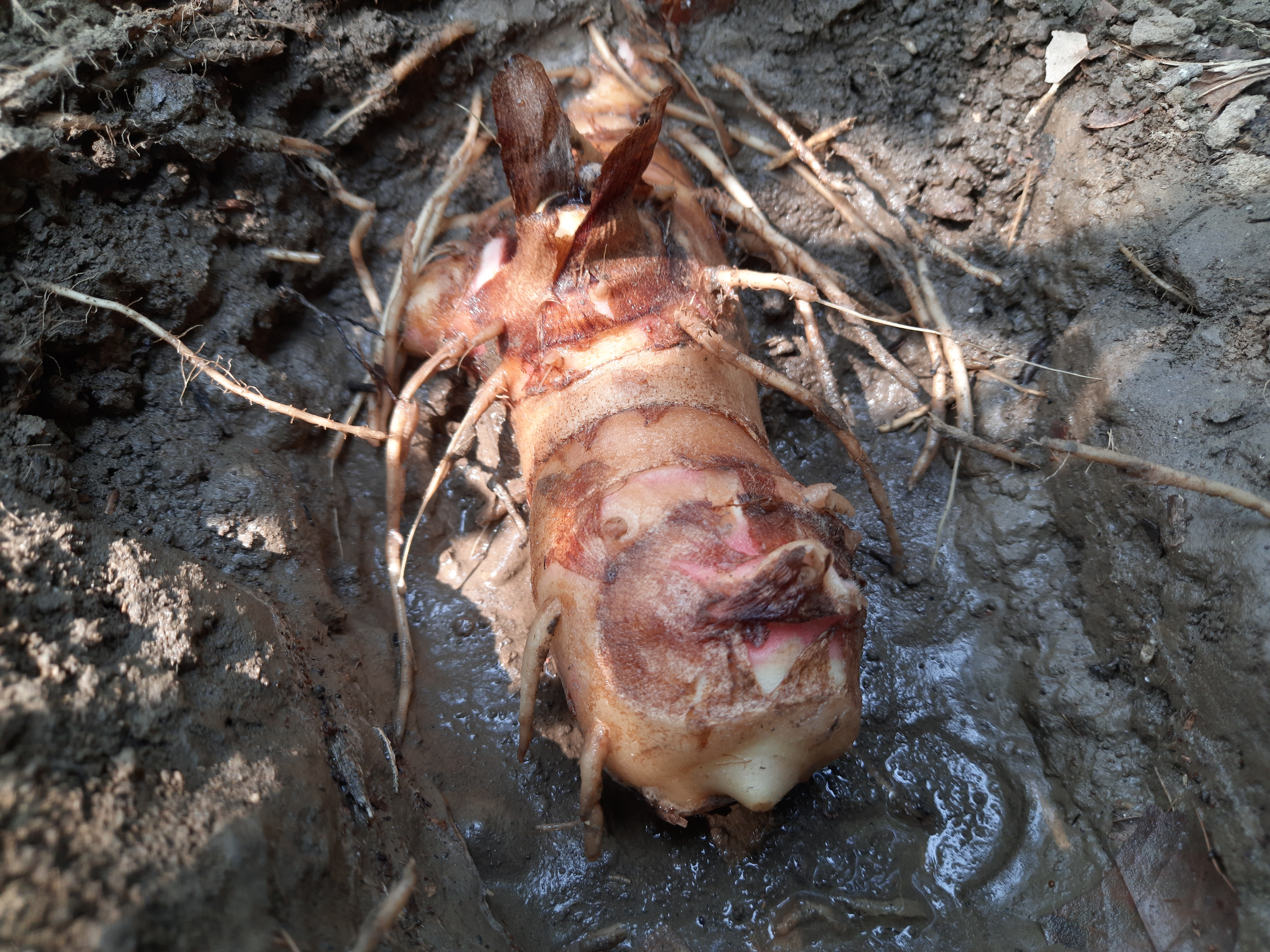
Rhizome

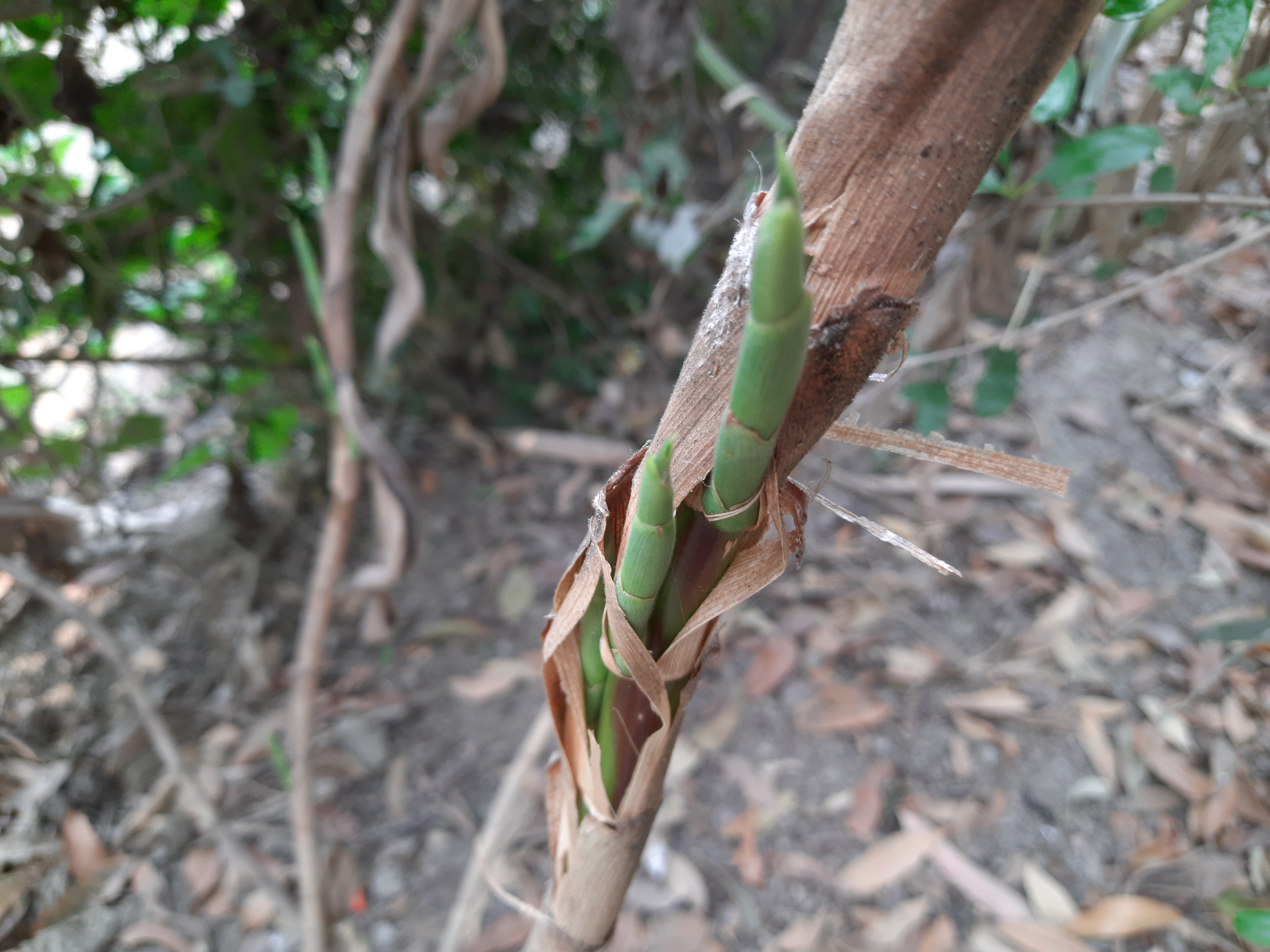
New buds after winter

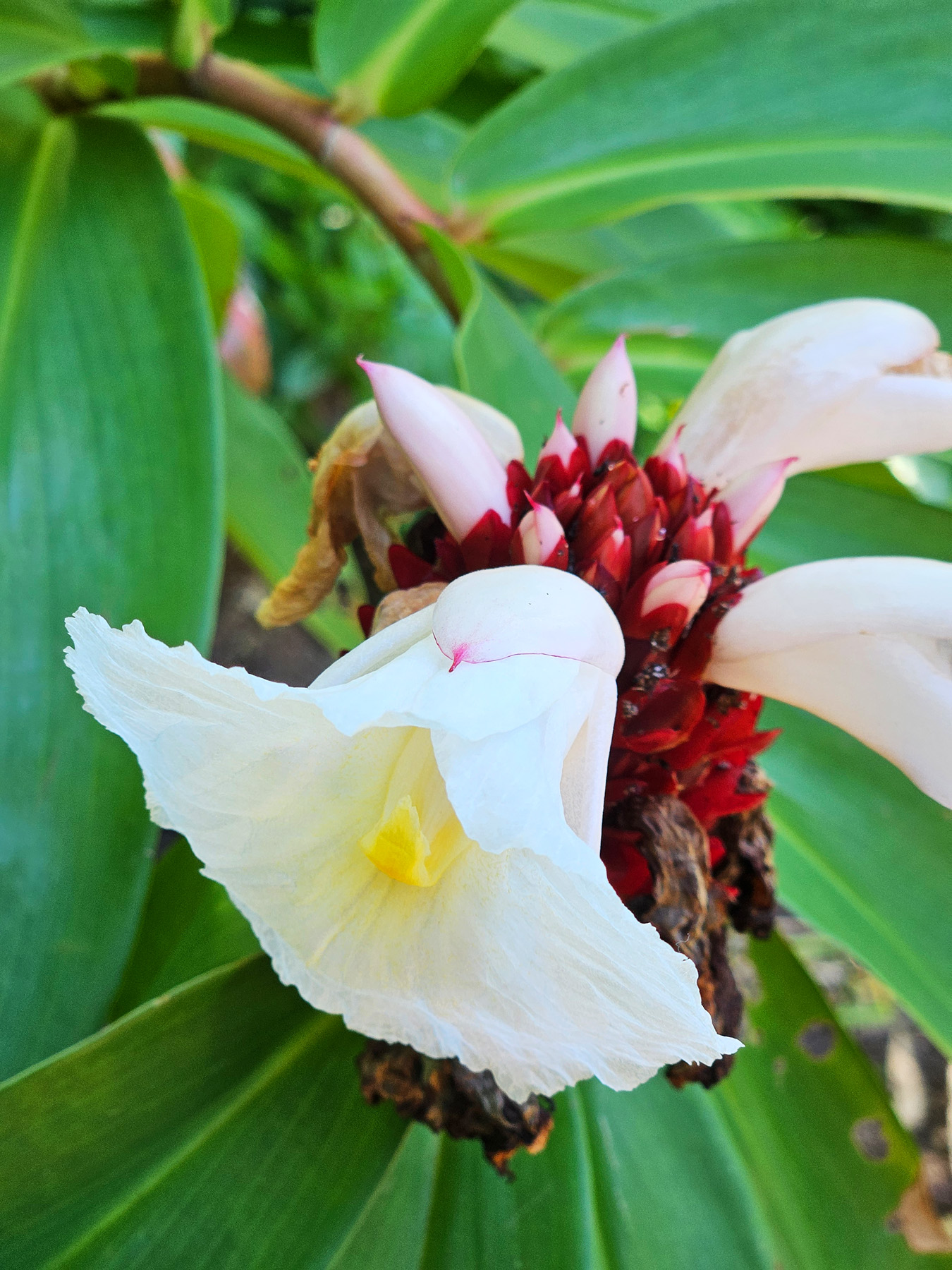
Hellenia speciosa (J.Koenig) S.R.Dutta (Hawaii, Maui)
