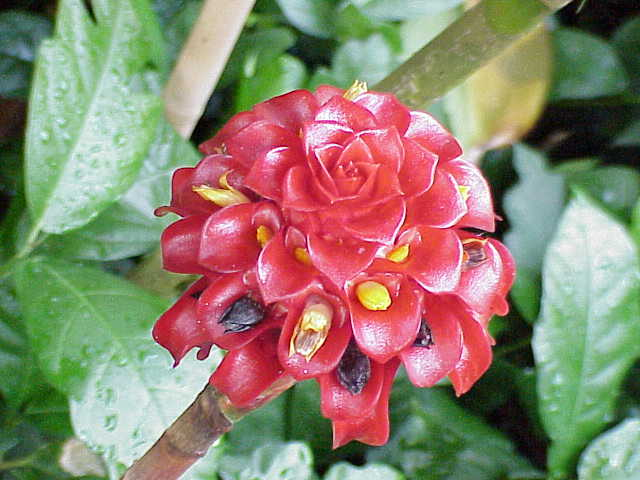
- Tapeinochilos ananassae of the family Costaceae

Scientific classification
- Kingdom: Plantae
- Clade: Tracheophytes
- Clade: Angiosperms
- Clade: Monocots
- Clade: Commelinids
- Order: Zingiberales
- Family: Costaceae; Nakai

Genera
- Chamaecostus C.D.Specht & D.W.Stev.; Costus L.; Dimerocostus Kuntze; Hellenia Retz. (synonym Cheilocostus C.D.Specht); Monocostus K.Schum.; Paracostus C.D.Specht; Parahellenia N.H.Xia, Juan Chen, L.Y.Zeng & S.Jin Zeng; Tapeinochilos Miq.

= Costaceae =

Family of flowering plants

Costaceae, known as the Costus family or spiral gingers, is a family of pantropical monocots. It belongs to the order Zingiberales, which contains horticulturally and economically important plants such as the banana (Musaceae), bird-of-paradise (Strelitziaceae), and edible ginger (Zingiberaceae). The seven genera in Costaceae together contain about 143 known species (1 in Monocostus, 2 in Dimerocostus, 16 in Tapeinochilos, 2 in Paracostus, c. 8 in Chamaecostus, c. 5 in Hellenia, and c. 80 in Costus). They are native to tropical climates of Asia, Africa, Central America, and South America. Several species are frequently found in cultivation.

== Description ==
The simple leaves are entire and spirally arranged, with those toward the base of the stem usually bladeless. Leaf bases have a closed sheath with a ligule, or projection at the top of the sheath.

Costaceae is different from the other families of Zingiberales in that its species have 5 fused staminodes, rather than 2 or 3, and the Costaceae contain no aromatic oils. The fused infertile stamens form a large petaloid labellum that often functions to attract pollinators. The flowers are solitary in Monocostus. In the other genera, the flowers are borne in a terminal spike that ranges from elongate to nearly capitate. Each flower is subtended by a large bract. The fruit is a berry or capsule. The rhizome is fleshy with tuberous roots.

== Taxonomy ==
Cladogram: Phylogeny of Zingiberales

- Zingiberales
  - - - Zingiberineae
        - Zingiberariae
          - Zingiberaceae
          - Costaceae
        - Cannariae
          - Cannaceae
          - Marantaceae
      - - Strelitziineae
          - Lowiaceae
          - Strelitziaceae
        - Heliconiaceae
  - - Musaceae

Phylogenetic tree of the family.

- Costaceae
  - - - Monocostus
      - Dimerocostus
    - Chamaecostus
  - - - - Tapeinochilos
        - - Hellenia
          - Cheilocostus
      - Paracostus
    - Costus

== Gallery ==
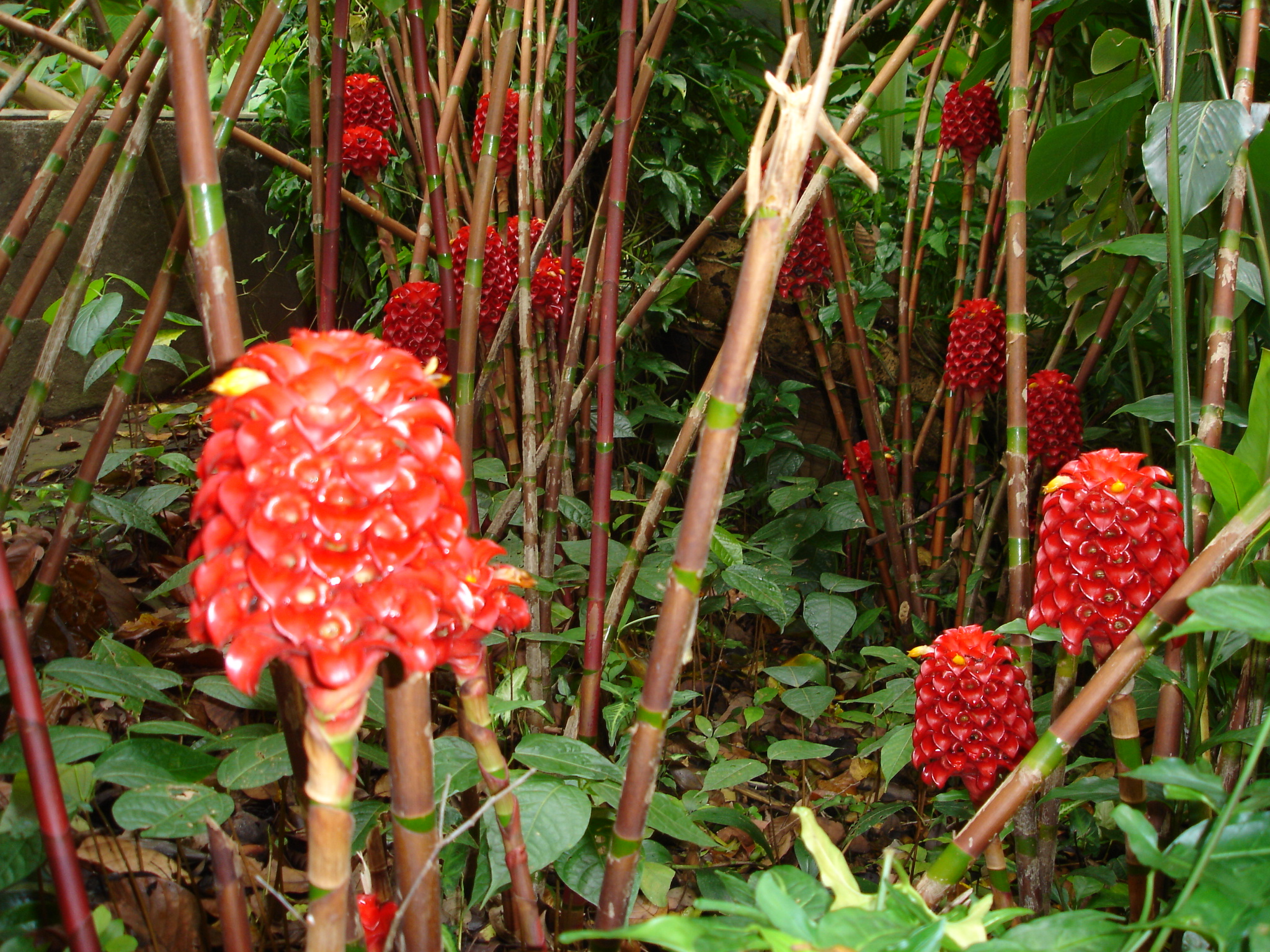
Tapeinochilos ananassae (wax ginger)

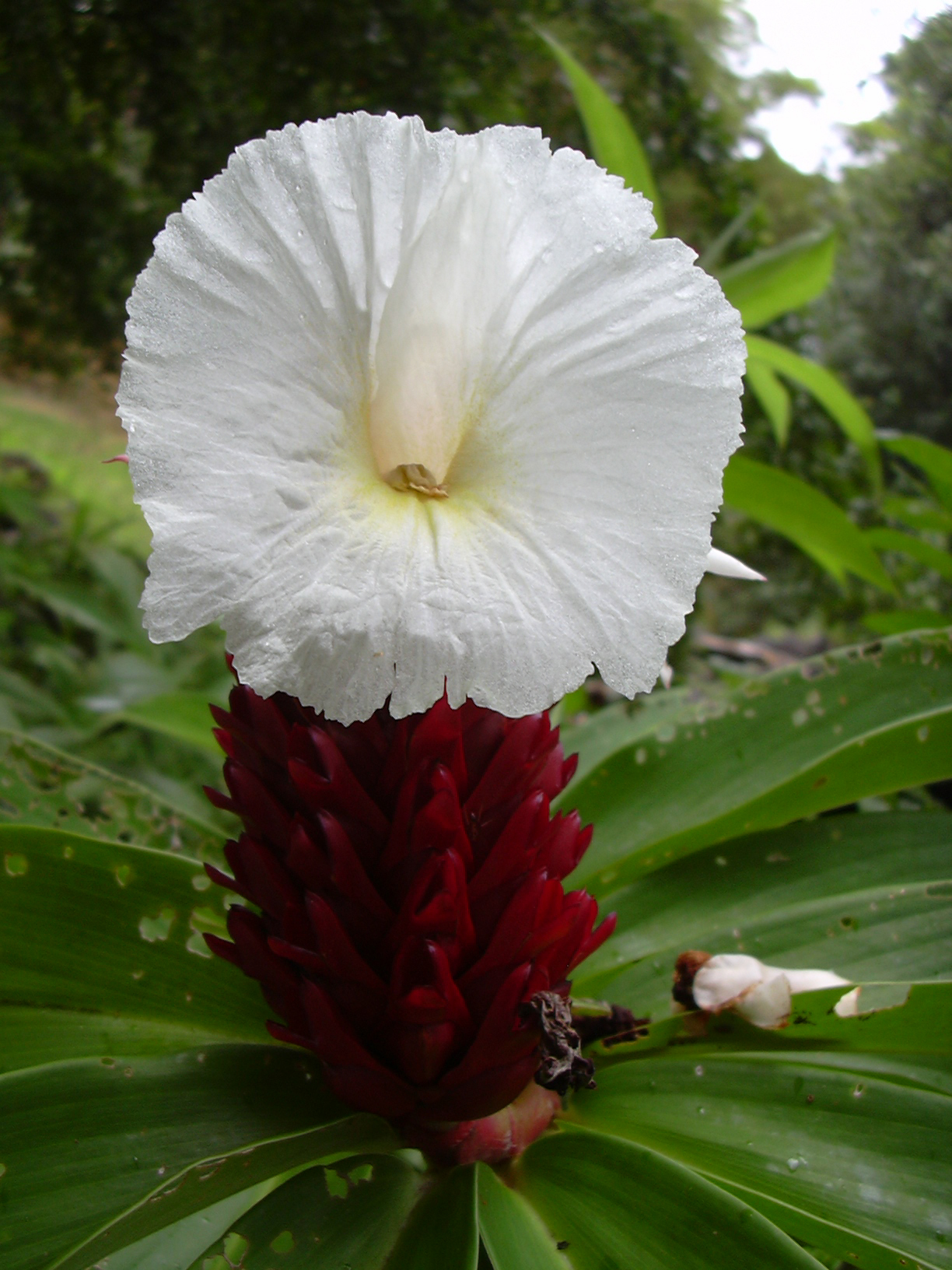
Hellenia speciosa (crêpe ginger)

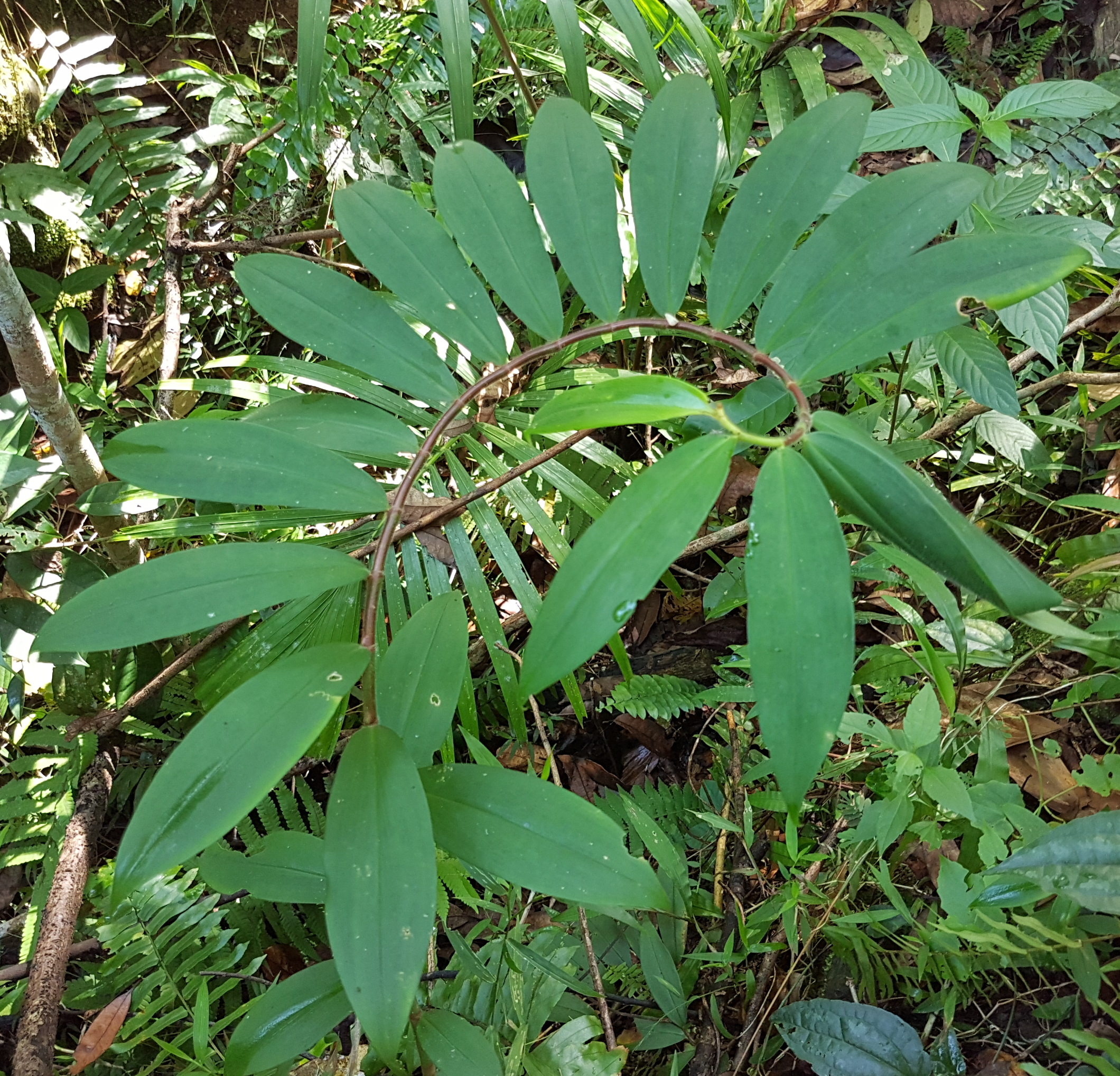
Spirally arranged leaves of wild Hellenia speciosa

== Bibliography ==
- Sass, C; Iles, WJ; Barrett, CF; Smith, SY; Specht, CD (21 January 2016). "Revisiting the Zingiberales: using multiplexed exon capture to resolve ancient and recent phylogenetic splits in a charismatic plant lineage". PeerJ. 4 e1584. doi:10.7717/peerj.1584. PMC 4727956. PMID 26819846.
