= Epimarptidae =

Scientific classification
- Kingdom: Animalia
- Phylum: Arthropoda
- Class: Insecta
- Order: Lepidoptera
- Infraorder: Heteroneura
- Clade: Eulepidoptera
- Clade: Ditrysia
- Clade: Apoditrysia
- Superfamily: Gelechioidea
- Family: Epimarptidae; Meyrick, 1914

Synonyms
- Epimarptinae

Family of moths

Epimarptidae is a family of moths in the superfamily Gelechioidea. Depending on source publication, it was previously monotypic. The lineage was previously seen as either a synonym of the family Batrachedridae, or a unique valid monotypic subfamily Epimarptinae of that family. However, elsewhere in the more recent literature, it is a distinct valid family.

== Taxonomy and systematics ==
Epimarptidae was created as a monotypic family by Edward Meyrick, 1914 for his new genus Epimarptis, with a single species from India. Soon after, Meyrick, 1917 added a second species, this time from Sri Lanka. At this time, Meyrick decided to reclassify the genus in the family Epermeniidae, an interpretation he maintained in all his subsequent publications. Meyrick, 1931 described a third species from Assam, eastern India. The genus remained with just these same three species from the Indian subcontinent until Kazuhiro Sugisima described a fourth new species from Japan in 2004.

In terms of the wider taxonomic context, the concept of the superfamily Gelechioidea had begun to crystallise in the late 1960s, but it was not until 1986 when Joël Minet was the first to include the genus Epimarptis in this grouping. Minet, 1990 resurrected the family Epimarptidae for Epimarptis, followed in this by Sergey Yu. Sinev in 1992. However, Ron Hodges, 1998 alternatively reclassified them in the subfamily Epimarptinae within the family Batrachedridae, alongside his redefinition of the subfamily Batrachedrinae. They were together said to be united by several shared morphological traits as proposed synapomorphies.

After this, Koster & Sinev's 2003 book "Microlepidoptera of Europe" disregard the findings of Hodges, instead continuing to present the proposed "Batrachedrinae" only at the rank of family as Batrachedridae, but were not explicit about Epimarptis (which doesn't occur in Europe). More importantly, in 2004, Lauri Kaila used morphological traits with cladistic analysis under parsimony to infer the phylogeny of the superfamily Gelechioidea. This initially included Epimarptis philocoma as a representative of Epimarptis, but which lacked many of the morphological characters being assessed, as the genus had not been seen again since Meyrick's early works, let alone studied. Due to this incompleteness Epimarptis was then excluded from some subsequent analyses. However, when included, the analyses revealed that Epimarptis philocoma might belong to, or be allied to, any of several different genera depending on the analytical details. On consensus, this rendered a collapse of resolution in the basal clades of his Coleophoridae sensu lato. The lineage was, however, clearly included in the wider Coleophoridae sensu lato. This also included representatives of the family Coleophoridae sensu stricto, Hodges' subfamily Batrachedrinae, plus the genera Coelopoeta, Stathmopoda and perhaps Idioglossa. Kaila was careful to state that he was not formally revising Hodges' classification in his paper.

A few months after publication of Kaila's analyses, Sugisima published a new Epimarptis species from Japan. With this, he attempted to fill in some morphological characters that had previously been missing from Kaila's data in order to help resolve the remaining questions about the taxonomy. However, the expanded character data failed to improve phylogenetic resolution, and in contrast arguably made the proposed classification of Epimarptis within the Coleophoridae sensu lato less certain. Nor did the additional character data help resolve whether the lineage should be placed in Batrachedrinae (or not). That said, Sugisima mentions that in light of his further morphological observations and those of Kaila, he finds the synapomorphies proposed by Hodges 1998 to define the family Batrachedrinae and its subfamilies as questionable.

In van Nieukerken et al., 2011 (the section on Lepidoptera, part of Zhang's (2011) attempt to summarise all known animals), the authors were aware of Hodges' (1998) work, but chose to repudiate it and again recognise Epimarptidae as a family. That was detailed as one genus for Epimarptis, plus four species. Later, Heikkilä et al, 2014 bolstered Hodges' (1998) viewpoint using cladistics, synonymising the family Epimarptidae with Batrachedridae. However, a subsequent study by Wang & Li, 2020 again proposed restoration of Epimarptidae as a distinct valid family. This also then included a second genus, namely Idioglossa Walsingham, 1881. With the inclusion of Idioglossa miraculosa (Frey & Boll, 1878) from the Southeastern United States, the geographic distribution of the family Epimarptidae was expanded to include North America.

Included taxa:

- Epimarptis Meyrick, 1914
  - Epimarptis hiranoi Sugisima, 2004 - Japan (Honshu)
  - Epimarptis isoloxa Meyrick, 1931 - India (Assam)
  - Epimarptis philocoma Meyrick, 1914 - India (Karnataka possibly Mumbai)
  - Epimarptis septicodes Meyrick, 1917 - Sri Lanka (Maskeliya)
- Idioglossa Walsingham, 1881
  - Idioglossa argodora Meyrick, 1913 - India (Southern States)
  - Idioglossa miraculosa (Frey & Boll, 1878) - USA (Southeastern states)
  - (plus several other species).

Beyond these, the species Houdinia flexissima Hoare, Dugdale & Watts, 2006 from New Zealand appears similar and may be a close ally, along with undescribed species from New Zealand and Australia. Hoare et al., 2006 classified their species under Batrachedridae rather that Epimarptidae due to context from Kaila's 2004 studies, but it might be revised as Epimarptidae, or at least the subfamily Epimarptinae sensu Hodges, depending on the taxonomy used. Otherwise, Sugisima, 2004 suggested that is probable that other species of the genus Epimarptis (or the wider revised group) have already been collected and await description, especially in collections in Japan and Europe.

== Ecology ==
Almost nothing is known about the ecology of the family. Epimarptis hiranoi was mostly collected at low altitudes, as presumably was Epimarptis philocoma, but Epimarptis septicodes was collected at relatively high elevations. The moths all appear to be night-fliers. In E. hiranoi, the adult imagoes are only known to fly from mid-June to mid-July, with a peak in the second quarter. The larvae are claimed to be unknown, and so the life histories or host plants of none of the species are known. However, in the original description of the type species Epimarptis philocoma Meyrick, 1914, we see that Meyrick (1914) outlines some such attributes from his source Mr. Maxwell, such as that the larvae are reddish (including the head), living in a white web on the midrib of an unknown plant. Also that the cocoon resembles a bird-dropping.
