= Epiamomum epiphyticum =

Scientific classification
- Kingdom: Plantae
- Clade: Tracheophytes
- Clade: Angiosperms
- Clade: Monocots
- Clade: Commelinids
- Order: Zingiberales
- Family: Zingiberaceae
- Subfamily: Alpinioideae
- Tribe: Alpinieae
- Genus: Epiamomum
- Species: E. epiphyticum

Binomial name
- Epiamomum epiphyticum (R.M.Sm.) A.D.Poulsen & Skornick.

Synonyms
- Amomum R.M.Sm.

Species of flowering plant

Epiamomum epiphyticum is a monocotyledonous plant species in the family Zingiberaceae. It was previously placed as Amomum epiphyticum, described by Rosemary Margaret Smith.
