= Newmania =

Newmania may refer to:

- Newmania, a genus of moths in the family Anthelidae, considered synonymous with Anthela
- Newmania (plant), a genus of plants in the family Zingiberaceae
