= Pleuranthodium roemeri =

Scientific classification
- Kingdom: Plantae
- Clade: Tracheophytes
- Clade: Angiosperms
- Clade: Monocots
- Clade: Commelinids
- Order: Zingiberales
- Family: Zingiberaceae
- Genus: Pleuranthodium
- Species: P. roemeri

Binomial name
- Pleuranthodium roemeri (Valeton) R.M.Sm.

Species of plant

Pleuranthodium roemeri is a monocotyledonous plant species first described by Theodoric Valeton, and given its current name by Rosemary Margaret Smith. Pleuranthodium roemeri is part of the genus Pleuranthodium and the family Zingiberaceae. No subspecies are listed in the Catalog of Life.
