= Pleuranthodium floribundum =

Scientific classification
- Kingdom: Plantae
- Clade: Tracheophytes
- Clade: Angiosperms
- Clade: Monocots
- Clade: Commelinids
- Order: Zingiberales
- Family: Zingiberaceae
- Genus: Pleuranthodium
- Species: P. floribundum

Binomial name
- Pleuranthodium floribundum (K.Schum.) R.M.Sm.

Species of plant

Pleuranthodium floribundum is a monocotyledonous plant species first described by Karl Moritz Schumann, and given its current name by Rosemary Margaret Smith. Pleuranthodium floribundum is part of the genus Pleuranthodium and the family Zingiberaceae.

The species' range is Papua New Guinea. No subspecies are listed in the Catalog of Life.
