= Pleuranthodium papilionaceum =

Scientific classification
- Kingdom: Plantae
- Clade: Embryophytes
- Clade: Tracheophytes
- Clade: Spermatophytes
- Clade: Angiosperms
- Clade: Monocots
- Clade: Commelinids
- Order: Zingiberales
- Family: Zingiberaceae
- Genus: Pleuranthodium
- Species: P. papilionaceum

Binomial name
- Pleuranthodium papilionaceum (K.Schum.) R.M.Sm.

Species of plant

Pleuranthodium papilionaceum is a monocotyledonous plant species first described by Karl Moritz Schumann, and given its current name by Rosemary Margaret Smith. Pleuranthodium papilionaceum is part of the genus Pleuranthodium and the family Zingiberaceae.

The species' range is in Papua New Guinea. No subspecies are listed in the Catalog of Life.
