= Kedhalia =

Scientific classification
- Kingdom: Plantae
- Clade: Tracheophytes
- Clade: Angiosperms
- Clade: Monocots
- Clade: Commelinids
- Order: Zingiberales
- Family: Zingiberaceae
- Subfamily: Zingiberoideae
- Tribe: Zingibereae
- Genus: Kedhalia; C.K.Lim
- Species: K. flaviflora

Binomial name
- Kedhalia flaviflora C.K.Lim

Genus of plants

Kedhalia is a genus of plants in the family Zingiberaceae. It currently contains one known species, Kedhalia flaviflora, described by Lim Chong Keat. No subspecies are listed in the Catalog of Life.

== Distribution ==
It is found in Peninsular Malaysia.
