= Aulotandra angustifolia =

Scientific classification
- Kingdom: Plantae
- Clade: Embryophytes
- Clade: Tracheophytes
- Clade: Spermatophytes
- Clade: Angiosperms
- Clade: Monocots
- Clade: Commelinids
- Order: Zingiberales
- Family: Zingiberaceae
- Genus: Aulotandra
- Species: A. angustifolia

Binomial name
- Aulotandra angustifolia H.Perrier

Species of plant

Aulotandra angustifolia is a monocotyledonous plant species native to Northeast Madagascar. It was first described in 1939 by Joseph Marie Henry Alfred Perrier de la Bâthie. Aulotandra angustifolia is part of the genus Aulotandra and the family Zingiberaceae.
