= Pleuranthodium pelecystylum =

Scientific classification
- Kingdom: Plantae
- Clade: Tracheophytes
- Clade: Angiosperms
- Clade: Monocots
- Clade: Commelinids
- Order: Zingiberales
- Family: Zingiberaceae
- Genus: Pleuranthodium
- Species: P. pelecystylum

Binomial name
- Pleuranthodium pelecystylum (K.Schum.) R.M.Sm.

Species of plant

Pleuranthodium pelecystylum is a monocotyledonous plant species first described by Karl Moritz Schumann, and given its current name by Rosemary Margaret Smith. Pleuranthodium pelecystylum is part of the genus Pleuranthodium and the family Zingiberaceae. No subspecies are listed in the Catalog of Life.
