= Distichochlamys citrea =

Scientific classification
- Kingdom: Plantae
- Clade: Tracheophytes
- Clade: Angiosperms
- Clade: Monocots
- Clade: Commelinids
- Order: Zingiberales
- Family: Zingiberaceae
- Genus: Distichochlamys
- Species: D. citrea

Binomial name
- Distichochlamys citrea M.F.Newman

Species of flowering plant

Distichochlamys citrea is a species of flowering plant in the ginger family. It was first described by M.F.Newman.

== Range ==
Distichochlamys citrea is native to Vietnam.
