= Distichochlamys benenica =

Scientific classification
- Kingdom: Plantae
- Clade: Tracheophytes
- Clade: Angiosperms
- Clade: Monocots
- Clade: Commelinids
- Order: Zingiberales
- Family: Zingiberaceae
- Genus: Distichochlamys
- Species: D. benenica

Binomial name
- Distichochlamys benenica Q.B.Nguyen & Škorničk.

Species of flowering plant

Distichochlamys benenica is a species of flowering plant in the ginger family. It was first described by Q.B.Nguyen and Škorničk.

== Range ==
Distichochlamys benenica is native to northern Vietnam.
