= Pleuranthodium hellwigii =

Scientific classification
- Kingdom: Plantae
- Clade: Tracheophytes
- Clade: Angiosperms
- Clade: Monocots
- Clade: Commelinids
- Order: Zingiberales
- Family: Zingiberaceae
- Genus: Pleuranthodium
- Species: P. hellwigii

Binomial name
- Pleuranthodium hellwigii (K.Schum.) R.M.Sm.

Species of plant

Pleuranthodium hellwigii is a monocotyledonous plant species that was first described by Karl Moritz Schumann, and given its current name by Rosemary Margaret Smith. Pleuranthodium hellwigii is part of the genus Pleuranthodium and the family Zingiberaceae.

The species' range is in Papua New Guinea. No subspecies are listed in the Catalog of Life.
