= Haniffia albiflora =

Scientific classification
- Kingdom: Plantae
- Clade: Tracheophytes
- Clade: Angiosperms
- Clade: Monocots
- Clade: Commelinids
- Order: Zingiberales
- Family: Zingiberaceae
- Genus: Haniffia
- Species: H. albiflora

Binomial name
- Haniffia albiflora K.Larsen & J.Mood

Species of flowering plant

Haniffia albiflora is a monocotyledonous plant species described by Kai Larsen and J. Mood. Haniffia albiflora is part of the genus Haniffia and the family Zingiberaceae. The IUCN categorizes the species globally as vulnerable.

The species' range is in Thailand. No subspecies are listed in the Catalog of Life.
