= Pleuranthodium biligulatum =

Scientific classification
- Kingdom: Plantae
- Clade: Tracheophytes
- Clade: Angiosperms
- Clade: Monocots
- Clade: Commelinids
- Order: Zingiberales
- Family: Zingiberaceae
- Genus: Pleuranthodium
- Species: P. biligulatum

Binomial name
- Pleuranthodium biligulatum (Valeton) R.M.Sm.

Species of plant

Pleuranthodium biligulatum is a monocotyledonous plant species first described by Theodoric Valeton, and given its current name by Rosemary Margaret Smith. Pleuranthodium biligulatum belongs to the genus Pleuranthodium and the family Zingiberaceae. No subspecies are listed in the Catalog of Life.
