= Pleuranthodium pterocarpum =

Scientific classification
- Kingdom: Plantae
- Clade: Tracheophytes
- Clade: Angiosperms
- Clade: Monocots
- Clade: Commelinids
- Order: Zingiberales
- Family: Zingiberaceae
- Genus: Pleuranthodium
- Species: P. pterocarpum

Binomial name
- Pleuranthodium pterocarpum (K.Schum.) R.M.Sm.

Species of plant

Pleuranthodium pterocarpum is a monocotyledonous plant species first described by Karl Moritz Schumann, and given its current name by Rosemary Margaret Smith. Pleuranthodium pterocarpum is part of the genus Pleuranthodium and the family Zingiberaceae. No subspecies are listed in the Catalog of Life.
