= Pleuranthodium pedicellatum =

Scientific classification
- Kingdom: Plantae
- Clade: Tracheophytes
- Clade: Angiosperms
- Clade: Monocots
- Clade: Commelinids
- Order: Zingiberales
- Family: Zingiberaceae
- Genus: Pleuranthodium
- Species: P. pedicellatum

Binomial name
- Pleuranthodium pedicellatum (Valeton) R.M.Sm.

Species of plant

Pleuranthodium pedicellatum is a monocotyledonous plant species first described by Theodoric Valeton, and given its current name by Rosemary Margaret Smith. Pleuranthodium pedicellatum is part of the genus Pleuranthodium and the family Zingiberaceae.

The species' range is in Papua New Guinea. No subspecies are listed in the Catalog of Life.
