= Rhynchanthus beesianus =

Scientific classification
- Kingdom: Plantae
- Clade: Tracheophytes
- Clade: Angiosperms
- Clade: Monocots
- Clade: Commelinids
- Order: Zingiberales
- Family: Zingiberaceae
- Genus: Rhynchanthus
- Species: R. beesianus

Binomial name
- Rhynchanthus beesianus W.W.Sm.

Species of flowering plant

Rhynchanthus beesianus is a monocotyledonous plant species described by William Wright Smith. Rhynchanthus beesianus is part of the genus Rhynchanthus and the family Zingiberaceae. No subspecies are listed in the Catalog of Life.
