= Pleuranthodium platynema =

Scientific classification
- Kingdom: Plantae
- Clade: Tracheophytes
- Clade: Angiosperms
- Clade: Monocots
- Clade: Commelinids
- Order: Zingiberales
- Family: Zingiberaceae
- Genus: Pleuranthodium
- Species: P. platynema

Binomial name
- Pleuranthodium platynema (K.Schum.) R.M.Sm.

Species of plant

Pleuranthodium platynema is a monocotyledonous plant species first described by Karl Moritz Schumann, and given its current name by Rosemary Margaret Smith. Pleuranthodium platynema is part of the genus Pleuranthodium and the family Zingiberaceae.

The species' range is Papua New Guinea. No subspecies are listed in the Catalog of Life.
