= Haniffia cyanescens =

Conservation status
- Endangered (IUCN 3.1)

Scientific classification
- Kingdom: Plantae
- Clade: Tracheophytes
- Clade: Angiosperms
- Clade: Monocots
- Clade: Commelinids
- Order: Zingiberales
- Family: Zingiberaceae
- Genus: Haniffia
- Species: H. cyanescens

Binomial name
- Haniffia cyanescens (Ridl.) Holttum

Species of flowering plant

Haniffia cyanescens is a monocotyledonous plant species that was first described by Henry Nicholas Ridley, and got its current name from Richard Eric Holttum. Haniffia cyanescens is part of the genus Haniffia and the family Zingiberaceae. It is an endangered species which is confined to Peninsular Malaysia.

The species is divided into the following subspecies:

- H. c. penangiana
- H. c. cyanescens
