= Geocharis =

Geocharis is the scientific name of two genera of organisms and may refer to:

- Geocharis (beetle), a genus of beetles in the family Carabidae
- Geocharis (plant), a genus of plants in the family Zingiberaceae
