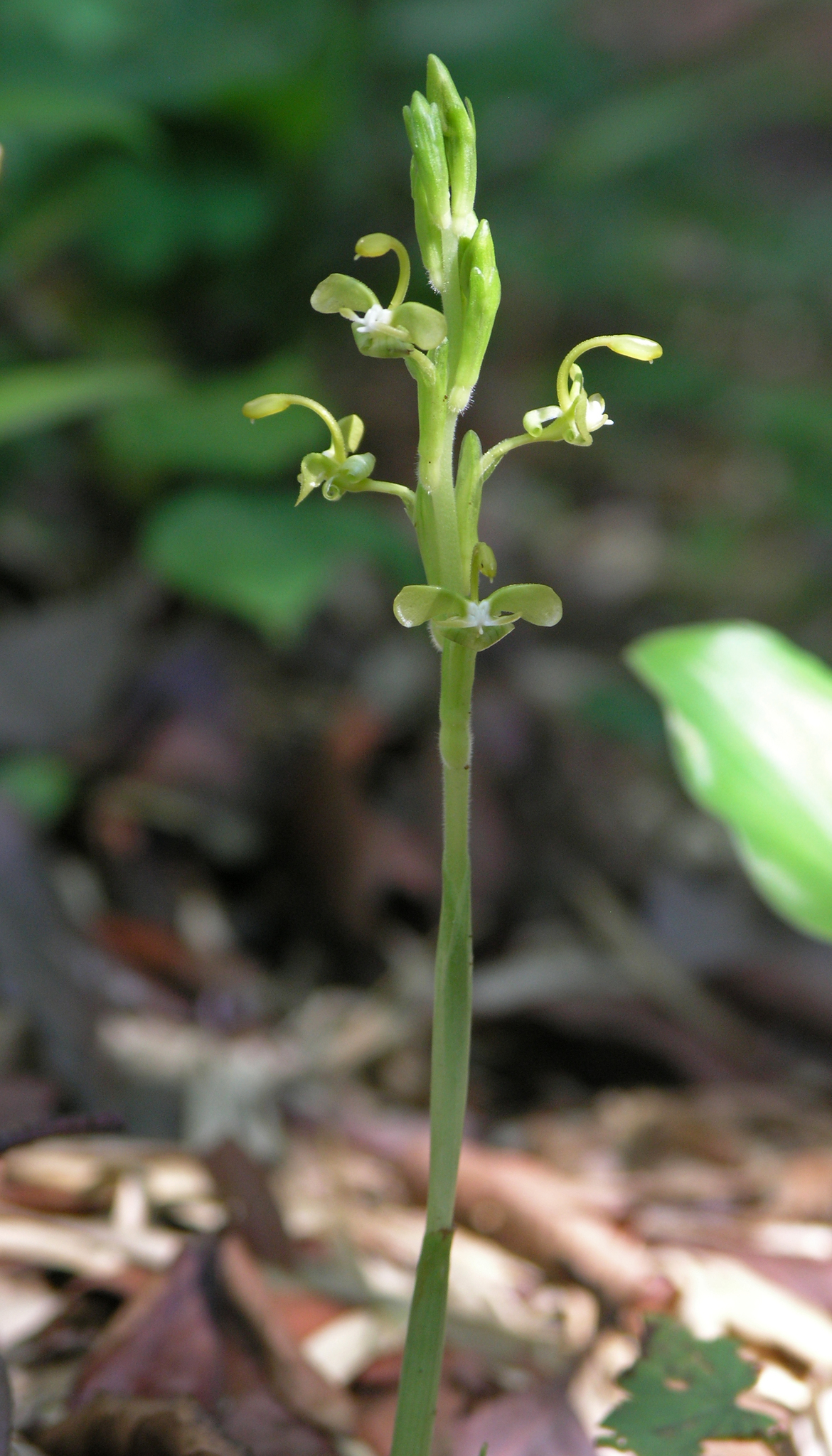
- Gagnepainia harmandii

Scientific classification
- Kingdom: Plantae
- Clade: Tracheophytes
- Clade: Angiosperms
- Clade: Monocots
- Clade: Commelinids
- Order: Zingiberales
- Family: Zingiberaceae
- Subfamily: Zingiberoideae
- Tribe: Globbeae
- Genus: Gagnepainia; K.Schum.

= Gagnepainia =

Genus of flowering plants

Gagnepainia is a genus of flowering plants in the family Zingiberaceae. It has three known species, all native to Indochina.

The genus was named in 1904 by Karl Moritz Schumann for French botanist François Gagnepain, who described many new species from the former colony of French Indochina.

== Species ==
Three species were initially described in 1895 as members of Hemiorchis, then transferred to the newly created Gagnepainia in 1904.

1. Gagnepainia godefroyi (Baill.) K.Schum. in H.G.A.Engler - Thailand, Myanmar, Cambodia
2. Gagnepainia harmandii (Baill.) K.Schum. in H.G.A.Engler (synonym G. thoreliana (Baill.) K.Schum. in H.G.A.Engler) - Cambodia, Vietnam
