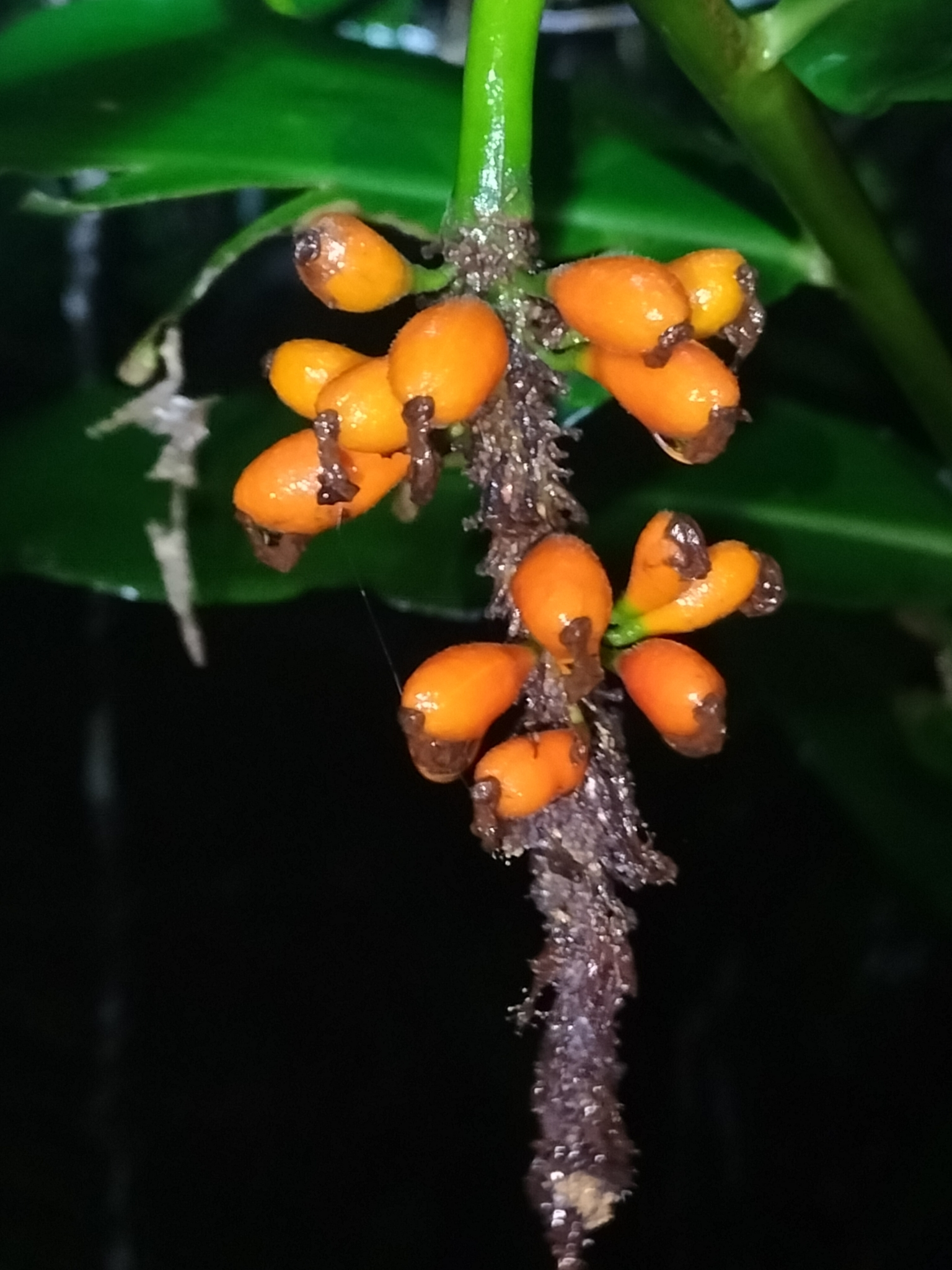
- Fruit

Conservation status
- Least Concern (IUCN 3.1)

Scientific classification
- Kingdom: Plantae
- Clade: Tracheophytes
- Clade: Angiosperms
- Clade: Monocots
- Clade: Commelinids
- Order: Zingiberales
- Family: Zingiberaceae
- Genus: Pleuranthodium
- Species: P. racemigerum

Binomial name
- Pleuranthodium racemigerum (F.Muell.) R.M.Sm.

Synonyms
- Alpinia racemigera F.Muell.; Psychanthus racemiger (F.Muell.) R.M.Sm.

= Pleuranthodium racemigerum =

Species of flowering plant

Pleuranthodium racemigerum, commonly known as orange fruited ginger, is a plant in the ginger family Zingiberaceae endemic to Queensland, Australia. It was first described by Ferdinand von Mueller as Alpinia racemigera, and given its current name by Rosemary Margaret Smith. It grows in well-developed rainforest and is mostly restricted to the wet tropics region.
