= Pleuranthodium floccosum =

Scientific classification
- Kingdom: Plantae
- Clade: Tracheophytes
- Clade: Angiosperms
- Clade: Monocots
- Clade: Commelinids
- Order: Zingiberales
- Family: Zingiberaceae
- Genus: Pleuranthodium
- Species: P. floccosum

Binomial name
- Pleuranthodium floccosum (Valeton) R.M.Sm.

Species of plant

Pleuranthodium floccosum is a monocotyledonous plant species first described by Theodoric Valeton, and given its current name by Rosemary Margaret Smith. Pleuranthodium floccosum is part of the genus Pleuranthodium and the family Zingiberaceae. No subspecies are listed in the Catalog of Life.
