= Pleuranthodium piundaundensis =

Scientific classification
- Kingdom: Plantae
- Clade: Tracheophytes
- Clade: Angiosperms
- Clade: Monocots
- Clade: Commelinids
- Order: Zingiberales
- Family: Zingiberaceae
- Genus: Pleuranthodium
- Species: P. piundaundensis

Binomial name
- Pleuranthodium piundaundensis (P.Royen) R.M.Sm.

New Papua Guinean plant species

Pleuranthodium piundaundensis is a monocotyledonous plant species that was first described by Pieter van Royen, and given its current name by Rosemary Margaret Smith. Pleuranthodium piundaundensis is part of the genus Pleuranthodium and the family Zingiberaceae.

The species' range is Papua New Guinea. No subspecies are listed in the Catalog of Life.
