= Haniffia flavescens =

Conservation status
- Least Concern (IUCN 3.1)

Scientific classification
- Kingdom: Plantae
- Clade: Tracheophytes
- Clade: Angiosperms
- Clade: Monocots
- Clade: Commelinids
- Order: Zingiberales
- Family: Zingiberaceae
- Genus: Haniffia
- Species: H. flavescens

Binomial name
- Haniffia flavescens Y.Y Sam & Julius

Species of flowering plant

Haniffia flavescens is a monocotyledonous plant species described by Y.Y.Sam and Avelinah Julius. Haniffia flavescens is part of the genus Haniffia and the family Zingiberaceae. No subspecies are listed in the Catalog of Life.
