= Rhynchanthus bluthianus =

Scientific classification
- Kingdom: Plantae
- Clade: Tracheophytes
- Clade: Angiosperms
- Clade: Monocots
- Clade: Commelinids
- Order: Zingiberales
- Family: Zingiberaceae
- Genus: Rhynchanthus
- Species: R. bluthianus

Binomial name
- Rhynchanthus bluthianus Wittm.

Species of flowering plant

Rhynchanthus bluthianus is a species in the ginger family, Zingiberaceae. It was first described by Ludwig Wittmack.

== Range ==
Rhynchanthus bluthianus is native to Burma.
