= Pleuranthodium neragaimae =

Scientific classification
- Kingdom: Plantae
- Clade: Tracheophytes
- Clade: Angiosperms
- Clade: Monocots
- Clade: Commelinids
- Order: Zingiberales
- Family: Zingiberaceae
- Genus: Pleuranthodium
- Species: P. neragaimae

Binomial name
- Pleuranthodium neragaimae (Gilli) R.M.Sm.

Species of plant

Pleuranthodium neragaimae is a monocotyledonous plant species that was first described by Alexander Gilli, and given its current name by Rosemary Margaret Smith. Pleuranthodium neragaimae is part of the genus Pleuranthodium and the family Zingiberaceae.

The species' range is in Papua New Guinea. No subspecies are listed in the Catalog of Life.
