= Pleuranthodium macropycnanthum =

Scientific classification
- Kingdom: Plantae
- Clade: Tracheophytes
- Clade: Angiosperms
- Clade: Monocots
- Clade: Commelinids
- Order: Zingiberales
- Family: Zingiberaceae
- Genus: Pleuranthodium
- Species: P. macropycnanthum

Binomial name
- Pleuranthodium macropycnanthum (Valeton) R.M.Sm.

Species of plant

Pleuranthodium macropycnanthum is a monocotyledonous plant species first described by Theodoric Valeton, and given its current name by Rosemary Margaret Smith. Pleuranthodium macropycnanthum is part of the genus Pleuranthodium and the family Zingiberaceae. No subspecies are listed in the Catalog of Life.
