= Caulokaempferia =

Scientific classification
- Kingdom: Plantae
- Clade: Tracheophytes
- Clade: Angiosperms
- Clade: Monocots
- Clade: Commelinids
- Order: Zingiberales
- Family: Zingiberaceae
- Subfamily: Zingiberoideae
- Genus: Caulokaempferia; K.Larsen (1964)

Type species
- Caulokaempferia linearis (Wall.) K.Larsen

Species
- 34; see text

Genus of flowering plants

Caulokaempferia is a genus of plants in the ginger family, first described in 1964. The genus is native to southeastern China, the eastern Himalayas, and Indochina (especially Thailand).

== Species ==
34 species are accepted.

- Caulokaempferia amplexicaulis Suksathan – Thailand
- Caulokaempferia appendiculata K.Larsen & Triboun – Thailand
- Caulokaempferia arunachalensis (Bhaumik, S.Dey & Langhu) Sushil K.Singh – Arunachal Pradesh
- Caulokaempferia bolavenensis Picheans. & Koonterm – Laos
- Caulokaempferia bracteata K.Larsen & S.S.Larsen – Thailand
- Caulokaempferia buengkanensis Picheans., Phokham & Wongsuwan – Thailand
- Caulokaempferia chayaniana Tiyaw. Thailand
- Caulokaempferia coenobialis (Hance) K.Larsen - Guangxi, Guangdong
- Caulokaempferia jirawongsei Picheans. & Mokkamul – Thailand
- Caulokaempferia khaomaenensis Picheans. & Mokkamul – Thailand
- Caulokaempferia kuapii K.Larsen – Thailand
- Caulokaempferia larsenii Suksathan & Triboun – Thailand
- Caulokaempferia limiana Mokkamul & Picheans. – Thailand
- Caulokaempferia linearis (Wall.) K.Larsen Assam, Bangladesh
- Caulokaempferia pedemontana Triboun & K.Larsen – Thailand
- Caulokaempferia petelotii K.Larsen – Vietnam
- Caulokaempferia phokhamii Picheans. & Douangde. – Laos
- Caulokaempferia phulangkaensis Picheans. – Thailand
- Caulokaempferia phuluangensis Picheans. & Mokkamul – Thailand
- Caulokaempferia phutokensis Picheans. – Thailand
- Caulokaempferia phuwoaensis Picheans. & Koonterm – Thailand
- Caulokaempferia picheansoonthonii Phokham & Prasarn – Thailand
- Caulokaempferia pubescens Picheans. & Phokham – Thailand
- Caulokaempferia saksuwaniae K.Larsen – southern Thailand
- Caulokaempferia satunensis Picheans. – Thailand
- Caulokaempferia saxicola K.Larsen – Thailand
- Caulokaempferia secunda (Wall.) K.Larsen – Assam, Bangladesh, Bhutan, Myanmar
- Caulokaempferia sikkimensis (King ex Baker) K.Larsen – Assam, Bhutan, Sikkim
- Caulokaempferia sirirugsae Ngamr. – Thailand
- Caulokaempferia suksathanii (S.Dey, Langhu & Bhaumik) Sushil K.Singh – Manipur
- Caulokaempferia tamdaoensis Picheans. & Inthar. – Vietnam
- Caulokaempferia wongsuwaniae Picheans. & Douangde. – Laos

=== Formerly placed here ===
- Pyrgophyllum yunnanense (Gagnep.) T.L.Wu & Z.Y.Chen (as Caulokaempferia yunnanensis (Gagnep.) R.M.Sm.)
