= Pleuranthodium tephrochlamys =

Scientific classification
- Kingdom: Plantae
- Clade: Tracheophytes
- Clade: Angiosperms
- Clade: Monocots
- Clade: Commelinids
- Order: Zingiberales
- Family: Zingiberaceae
- Genus: Pleuranthodium
- Species: P. tephrochlamys

Binomial name
- Pleuranthodium tephrochlamys (K.Schum. & Lauterb.) R.M.Sm.

Species of plant

Pleuranthodium tephrochlamys is a monocotyledonous plant species first described by Karl Moritz Schumann and Carl Adolf Georg Lauterbach, and given its current name by Rosemary Margaret Smith. Pleuranthodium tephrochlamys is part of the genus Pleuranthodium and the family Zingiberaceae.

The species' range is in Papua New Guinea. No subspecies are listed in the Catalog of Life.
