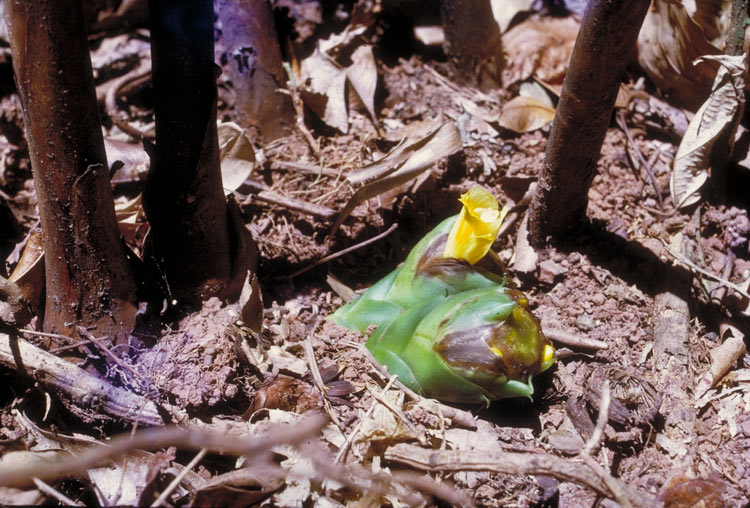
- Flower

Conservation status
- Least Concern (NCA)

Scientific classification
- Kingdom: Plantae
- Clade: Tracheophytes
- Clade: Angiosperms
- Clade: Monocots
- Clade: Commelinids
- Order: Zingiberales
- Family: Zingiberaceae
- Genus: Meistera
- Species: M. dallachyi

Binomial name
- Meistera dallachyi (F.Muell.) Škorničk. & M.F.Newman

Synonyms
- Amomum dallachyi F.Muell.; Cardamomum dallachyi (F.Muell.) Kuntze

= Meistera dallachyi =

Green ginger

Species of plant in the family Zingiberaceae

Meistera dallachyi, commonly known as green ginger, is a plant in the ginger family Zingiberaceae found only in the Wet Tropics bioregion of Queensland, Australia. It is a rhizomatous herb, that is, the stem grows horizontally underground and only the leaves appear above ground. The leaf sheaths (the "stems") may be up to 4 m (13 ft) long with a number of long narrow leaves on either side, each up to about 50 cm (20 in) long by 9 cm (3.5 in) wide.

The flowers are produced at ground level on a separate stalk to the leaves. The flowers have three white or cream petals and a labellum up to 6 cm (2.4 in) long. The fruit is a yellow or green, three-valved, spiky capsule about 45 mm (1.8 in) long by 30 mm (1.2 in) wide, containing a number of brown or black seeds.

== Taxonomy ==
This species was first described in 1873 as Amomum dallachyi by Australian botanist Ferdinand von Mueller, but by 2002 it was known that the genus Amomum was paraphyletic. A review of the genus published in 2018 resulted in this species being transferred to the genus Meistera.

== Distribution and habitat ==
It grows in rainforest, particularly where there are breaks in the canopy such as along roads and creeks. It occurs from Kutini-Payamu National Park in the northern part of Cape York, south to about Mission Beach. The altitudinal range is from sea level to about 400 m (1,300 ft).

== Conservation ==
This species is listed as least concern under the Queensland Government's Nature Conservation Act. As of December 2024, it has not been assessed by the International Union for Conservation of Nature.
