= Pleuranthodium iboense =

Scientific classification
- Kingdom: Plantae
- Clade: Tracheophytes
- Clade: Angiosperms
- Clade: Monocots
- Clade: Commelinids
- Order: Zingiberales
- Family: Zingiberaceae
- Genus: Pleuranthodium
- Species: P. iboense

Binomial name
- Pleuranthodium iboense (Valeton) R.M.Sm.

Species of plant

Pleuranthodium iboense is a monocotyledonous plant species first described by Theodoric Valeton, and given its current name by Rosemary Margaret Smith. Pleuranthodium iboense is part of the genus Pleuranthodium and the family Zingiberaceae.

The species' range is in Papua New Guinea. No subspecies are listed in the Catalog of Life.
