= Begonia tonkinensis =

Scientific classification
- Kingdom: Plantae
- Clade: Tracheophytes
- Clade: Angiosperms
- Clade: Eudicots
- Clade: Rosids
- Order: Cucurbitales
- Family: Begoniaceae
- Genus: Begonia
- Species: B. tonkinensis

Binomial name
- Begonia tonkinensis Gagnep.

Species of plant

Begonia tonkinensis is a plant species in the family Begoniaceae. The species is part of the section Diploclinium. It was described in 1919 by François Gagnepain.

== Description ==
The Vietnamese name is Thu hải đường bắc bộ. It is a vascular plant, "commonly upright-stemmed, rhizomatous, or tuberous".

== Distribution ==
This species is native to Vietnam.
