= Pyrgophyllum =

Scientific classification
- Kingdom: Plantae
- Clade: Tracheophytes
- Clade: Angiosperms
- Clade: Monocots
- Clade: Commelinids
- Order: Zingiberales
- Family: Zingiberaceae
- Subfamily: Zingiberoideae
- Tribe: Zingibereae
- Genus: Pyrgophyllum (Gagnep.) T.L.Wu & Z.Y.Chen (1989)
- Species: P. yunnanense

Binomial name
- Pyrgophyllum yunnanense (Gagnep.) T.L.Wu & Z.Y.Chen (1989)

Synonyms
- Caulokaempferia yunnanensis (Gagnep.) R.M.Sm. (1972); Kaempferia fongyuensis Gagnep. (1901); Kaempferia yunnanensis Gagnep. (1901) (basionym); Monolophus yunnanensis (Gagnep.) T.L.Wu & S.J.Chen (1978)

Genus of flowering plants

Pyrgophllum yunnanense is a species of flowering plant in the ginger family, Zingiberaceae. It is the sole species in genus Pyrgophyllum. It is a tuberous geophyte native to Yunnan and Sichuan provinces of south-central China.
