= Aulotandra =

Scientific classification
- Kingdom: Plantae
- Clade: Tracheophytes
- Clade: Angiosperms
- Clade: Monocots
- Clade: Commelinids
- Order: Zingiberales
- Family: Zingiberaceae
- Subfamily: Alpinioideae
- Tribe: Alpinieae
- Genus: Aulotandra; Gagnep.

Type species
- Aulotandra madagascariensis Gagnep.

Genus of flowering plants

Aulotandra is a genus of flowering plants native to Cameroon and Madagascar.

== Species ==
- Aulotandra angustifolia H.Perrier - Madagascar
- Aulotandra humbertii H.Perrier - Madagascar
- Aulotandra kamerunensis Loes - Cameroon
- Aulotandra madagascariensis Gagnep. - Madagascar
- Aulotandra trialata H.Perrier - Madagascar
- Aulotandra trigonocarpa H.Perrier - Madagascar
