= Pleuranthodium branderhorstii =

Scientific classification
- Kingdom: Plantae
- Clade: Tracheophytes
- Clade: Angiosperms
- Clade: Monocots
- Clade: Commelinids
- Order: Zingiberales
- Family: Zingiberaceae
- Genus: Pleuranthodium
- Species: P. branderhorstii

Binomial name
- Pleuranthodium branderhorstii (Valeton) R.M.Sm.

Species of plant

Pleuranthodium branderhorstii is a monocotyledonous plant species first described by Theodoric Valeton, and given its current name by Rosemary Margaret Smith. Pleuranthodium branderhorstii belongs to the genus Pleuranthodium and the family Zingiberaceae. No subspecies are listed in the Catalog of Life.
