= Johoralia =

Scientific classification
- Kingdom: Plantae
- Clade: Tracheophytes
- Clade: Angiosperms
- Clade: Monocots
- Clade: Commelinids
- Order: Zingiberales
- Family: Zingiberaceae
- Genus: Johoralia; C.K.Lim (2015)
- Species: J. lada

Binomial name
- Johoralia lada C.K.Lim (2015)

Genus of flowering plants

Johoralia lada is a species of flowering plant in the ginger family, Zingiberaceae. It is the sole species in genus Johoralia. It is a rhizomatous geophyte endemic to Peninsular Malaysia.
