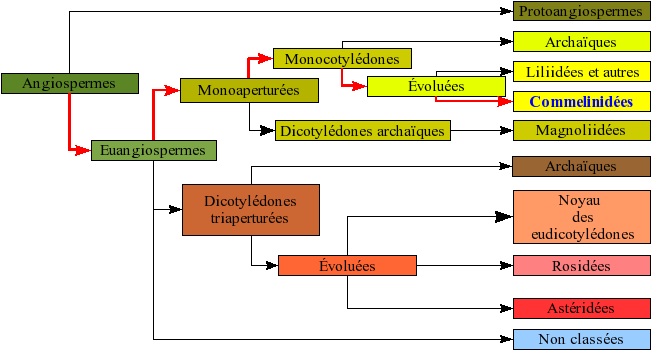
- hierarchical discription of Angiosperms

Scientific classification
- Kingdom: Plantae
- Clade: Embryophytes
- Clade: Tracheophytes
- Clade: Angiosperms
- Clade: Monocots
- Clade: Commelinids
- Order: Zingiberales
- Family: Zingiberaceae
- Subfamily: Zingiberoideae
- Tribe: Zingibereae
- Genus: Parakaempferia; A.S.Rao & D.M.Verma
- Species: P. synantha

Binomial name
- Parakaempferia synantha A.S.Rao & D.M.Verma

= Parakaempferia =

Genus of flowering plants

Parakaempferia is a genus of plants in the ginger family. It contains only one known species, Parakaempferia synantha, first described in 1971 and endemic to the Assam region of eastern India.
