= Cyphostigma =

Scientific classification
- Kingdom: Plantae
- Clade: Tracheophytes
- Clade: Angiosperms
- Clade: Monocots
- Clade: Commelinids
- Order: Zingiberales
- Family: Zingiberaceae
- Subfamily: Alpinioideae
- Tribe: Alpinieae
- Genus: Cyphostigma; Benth.
- Species: C. pulchellum

Binomial name
- Cyphostigma pulchellum (Thwaites) Benth.

Synonyms
- Amomum pulchellum Thwaites; Cyphostigma pedicellatum K.Schum. in H.G.A.Engler

Genus of flowering plants

Cyphostigma is a genus of plants. It contains only one accepted species, Cyphostigma pulchellum, endemic to Sri Lanka.
