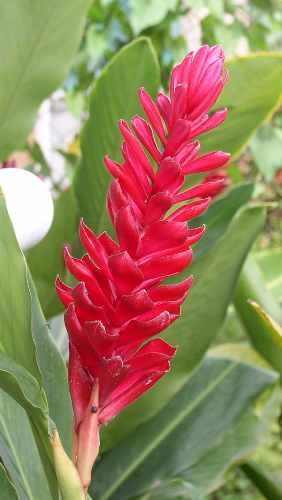
- Alpinia purpurata

Scientific classification
- Kingdom: Plantae
- Clade: Tracheophytes
- Clade: Angiosperms
- Clade: Monocots
- Clade: Commelinids
- Order: Zingiberales
- Family: Zingiberaceae
- Subfamily: Alpinioideae; Hassk.

Tribes & Genera
- See text

= Alpinioideae =

Subfamily of flowering plants

Alpinioideae is a subfamily of plants in the family Zingiberaceae.

== Tribes & genera ==
=== Tribe Alpinieae ===
- Adelmeria
- Aframomum
- Alpinia
- Amomum - synonym Elettariopsis
- Aulotandra
- Conamomum
- Cyphostigma
- Elettaria
- Epiamomum
- Etlingera
- Geocharis
- Geostachys
- Hellwigia
- Hornstedtia
- Lanxangia
- Leptosolena
- Meistera Giseke
- Plagiostachys
- Renealmia
- Siliquamomum
- Sulettaria
- Sundamomum
- Vanoverberghia
- Wurfbainia Giseke

=== Tribe Riedelieae ===
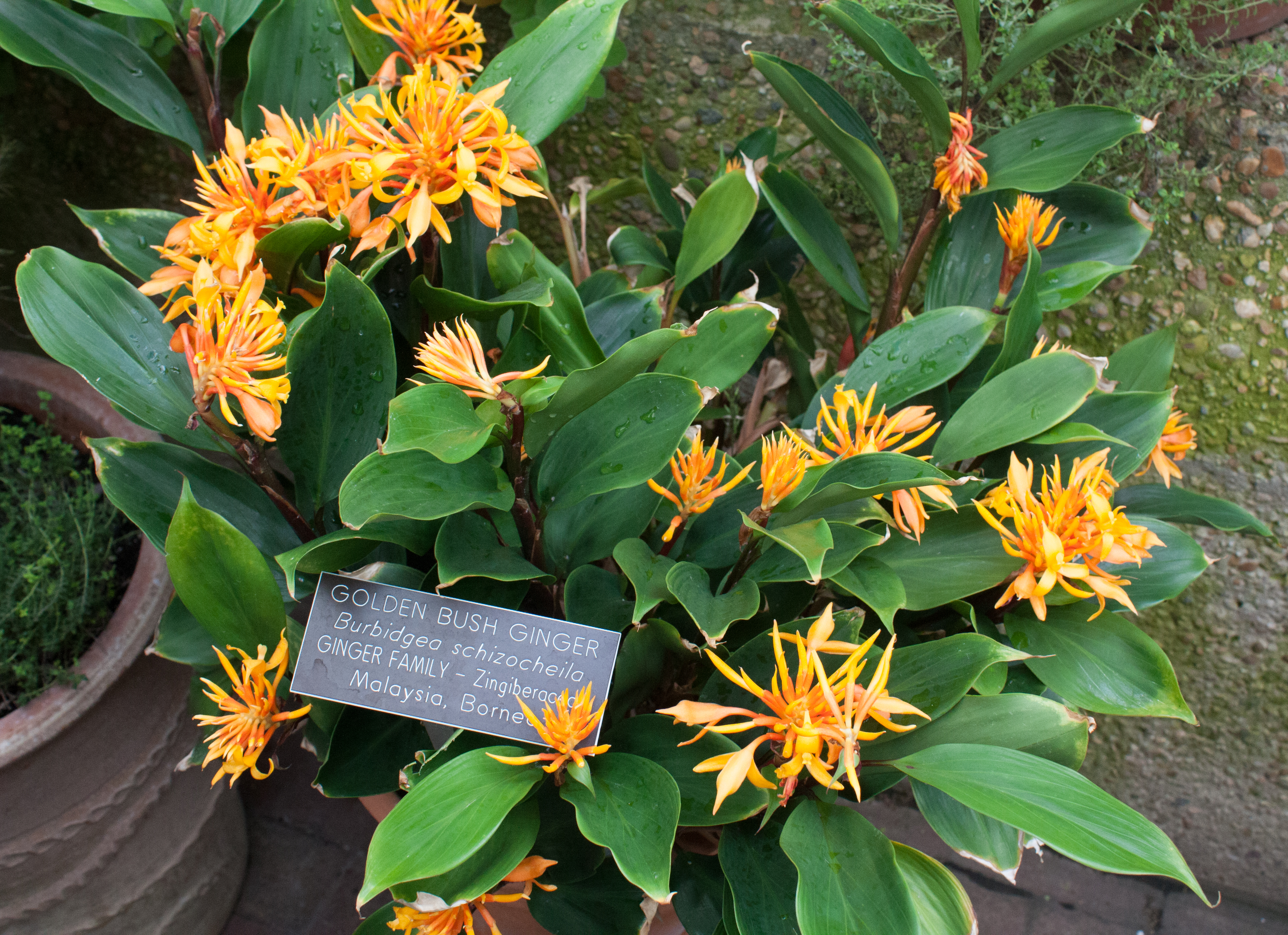
Burbidgea schizocheila

- Burbidgea
- Pleuranthodium
- Riedelia
- Siamanthus
