= Myxochlamys =

Scientific classification
- Kingdom: Plantae
- Clade: Tracheophytes
- Clade: Angiosperms
- Clade: Monocots
- Clade: Commelinids
- Order: Zingiberales
- Family: Zingiberaceae
- Genus: Myxochlamys; A.Takano & Nagam.

Genus of plants

Myxochlamys is a genus of flowering plants belonging to the family Zingiberaceae.

Its native range is Borneo.

Species:

- Myxochlamys amphiloxa R.J.Searle
- Myxochlamys mullerensis A.Takano & Nagam.
