= Haniffia =

Scientific classification
- Kingdom: Plantae
- Clade: Tracheophytes
- Clade: Angiosperms
- Clade: Monocots
- Clade: Commelinids
- Order: Zingiberales
- Family: Zingiberaceae
- Subfamily: Zingiberoideae
- Tribe: Zingibereae
- Genus: Haniffia; Holttum

Type species
- Haniffia cyanescens (Ridl.) Holttum

Genus of flowering plants

Haniffia is a genus of plants in the ginger family, Zingiberaceae. It has 3 known species, native to Thailand and to Peninsular Malaysia.

- Haniffia albiflora K.Larsen & J.Mood – Thailand
- Haniffia cyanescens (Ridl.) Holttum – Peninsular Malaysia
- Haniffia flavescens Y.Y.Sam & Julius – Peninsular Malaysia

It is named after Penangite botanist Mohamed Haniff (1872-1930).
