= Adelmeria =

Scientific classification
- Kingdom: Plantae
- Clade: Tracheophytes
- Clade: Angiosperms
- Clade: Monocots
- Clade: Commelinids
- Order: Zingiberales
- Family: Zingiberaceae
- Subfamily: Alpinioideae
- Tribe: Alpinieae
- Genus: Adelmeria; Ridl.

Synonyms
- Elmeria Ridl.

Genus of flowering plants

Adelmeria is a genus of perennial herbs in the family Zingiberaceae which are endemic to the Philippines. Previously, Adelmeria had been considered a synonym of the genus Alpinia, however, after a study showed Alpina to be highly polyphyletic, it was determined in 2019 that Adelmeria was a distinct genus.

== Taxonomy ==
The generic name of Adelmeria is derived from the American botanist and plant collector Adolph Daniel Edward Elmer (1870 – 1942).

The genus was first published and described by Henry Nicholas Ridley in Leafl. Philipp. Bot. Vol.2 on page 603 in 1909.

The Type species is Adelmeria paradoxa (Ridl.) Merr., which was published and described in Philipp. J. Sci., C Vl.9 on page 444 (1914 publ. 1915).

== Species ==
- Adelmeria alpinum Elmer
- Adelmeria dicranochila Docot & Banag
- Adelmeria gigantifolia (Elmer) Elmer
- Adelmeria isarogensis Docot & Banag
- Adelmeria leonardoi Docot & Banag
- Adelmeria oblonga Merr.
- Adelmeria paradoxa (Ridl.) Merr.
- Adelmeria pinetorum Ridl.
- Adelmeria undulata Docot & Banag
