= Siamanthus =

Scientific classification
- Kingdom: Plantae
- Clade: Tracheophytes
- Clade: Angiosperms
- Clade: Monocots
- Clade: Commelinids
- Order: Zingiberales
- Family: Zingiberaceae
- Subfamily: Alpinioideae
- Tribe: Riedelieae
- Genus: Siamanthus; K.Larsen & J.Mood
- Species: S. siliquosus

Binomial name
- Siamanthus siliquosus K.Larsen & J.Mood

Genus of flowering plants

Siamanthus is a genus of plants in the ginger family, Zingiberaceae. It contains only one known species, Siamanthus siliquosus, endemic to Thailand and first described in 1998.
