= Newmania (plant) =

Scientific classification
- Kingdom: Plantae
- Clade: Tracheophytes
- Clade: Angiosperms
- Clade: Monocots
- Clade: Commelinids
- Order: Zingiberales
- Family: Zingiberaceae
- Genus: Newmania; N.S.Lý & Škorničk.

Genus of plants

Newmania is a genus of rhizomatous based flowering plants belonging to the family Zingiberaceae. They are only native to Vietnam, and found in forests.

== Description ==
The common feature to genus Newmania is that they all grow from a rhizome across the ground, then produce a fairly weak false stem and purple-white flowers.

Species Newmania serpens has a weak sheath, the stem can grow up 100 cm (39.4 in) tall, usually bearing 10-15 leaves. The leaf blade is thin and shaped like a narrow ellipse. The leaves have very prominent veining. There are very few flowers, weak, growing close to the ground, they are purple lips with bright red streaks and white stripes on the bottom and middle of the plate. In contrast, species Newmania orthostachys has a much stronger sheath stem, the stem can grow up 60–80 cm (23.6–31.5 in) tall and can hold 5-8 leaves. There is a thick leaf blade, like an inverted ellipse with barely visible veining. There is tight and erect inflorescence, which has purple lips, with white stripes on the bottom and middle of the lips.

== Taxonomy ==
The genus name of Newmania is in honour of Mark Fleming Newman (b. 1959) British botanist, who worked at the Botanical Garden in Edinburgh and was a specialist in Zingiberaceae, he had earlier published the Zingiberaceae genus Distichochlamys in 1995, and was also honoured in the name of Alpinia newmanii N.S.Lý (in Zingiberaceae family) in 2017.

The genus was circumscribed by botanists Ngọc-Sâm Lý and Jana Škorničková in Taxon vol.60 on page 1390 in 2011.

The genus has been verified by the United States Department of Agriculture and the Agricultural Research Service, but it does not list any species.

3 species were published in 2018, N. cristata, N. gracilis and N. sontraensis. They noted that N. cristata showed signs of vivipary (meaning that instead of reproducing with seeds, there are monocot grasses that can reproduce asexually by creating new plantlets on the spikes).

== Species ==
As accepted by Plants of the World Online;

- Newmania cristata Luu, H.Ð.Trần & Škorničk.
- Newmania gracilis Škorničk., Q.B.Nguyen & H.Ð.Trần
- Newmania orthostachys N.S.Lý & Škorničk.
- Newmania serpens N.S.Lý & Škorničk.
- Newmania sessilanthera Luu & Škorničk.
- Newmania sontraensis H.Ð.Trần, Luu & Škorničk.

The type species is Newmania serpens N.S.Lý & Škorničk., Taxon 60: 1390. (2011)

== Habitat ==
Newmania serpens is found in forests at an altitude of 500–300 m (1,640–980 ft) above sea level.

== Uses ==
An essential oil can be found in the rhizomes and leaves of Newmania sontraensis. As well as several plant compounds and essential oils have been found in rhizomes of both Newmania orthostachys and Newmania serpens.

== Endangered ==
4 species of Newmania are listed by IUCN Red list as endangered (EN), one species is critically endangered (CR) and Newmania cristata is listed at least concern (LC).

Newmania serpens is listed as Critically Endangered since 2018, due to the threats of habitat degradation through agricultural expansion (for farms), the planting of plantations (for wood & pulp uses) and the collection of resin (from the plant).

Newmania sessilanthera is threatened by the planting of Acacia plantations (which are close to the forest population on Newmania sessilanthera).

Newmania orthostachys is threatened by agricultural expansion (for farms) and the planting of plantations (for wood and pulp uses).

Newmania gracilis is threatened by the surrounding forest habitat being affected by nearby logging and slash and burn agriculture, the habitat will probably be affected as the surrounding forest is cleared. The quality of the habitat has also been affected by road construction and a new hydropower plant (Trần et al. 2018).

== Other sources ==
- Jana Leong-Škorničková, Mark Newman, "Gingers of Cambodia, Laos & Vietnam", Singapore Botanic Gardens, National Parks Board, 2015
