= Geostachys =

Scientific classification
- Kingdom: Plantae
- Clade: Tracheophytes
- Clade: Angiosperms
- Clade: Monocots
- Clade: Commelinids
- Order: Zingiberales
- Family: Zingiberaceae
- Tribe: Alpinieae
- Genus: Geostachys (Baker) Ridl.

Synonyms
- Carenophila Ridl.

Genus of flowering plants

Geostachys is a genus of plants in the family Zingiberaceae. It is native to southeast Asia.

As of August 2024, Plants of the World Online accepted these species:

- Geostachys angustifolia K.Larsen – Thailand
- Geostachys annamensis Ridl. – Vietnam
- Geostachys aristata Škorničk., Q.B.Nguyen & H.Ð.Trần – Vietnam
- Geostachys belumensis C.K.Lim & K.H.Lau – Peninsular Malaysia
- Geostachys chayanii Mayoe – Thailand
- Geostachys decurvata (Baker) Ridl. – Peninsular Malaysia
- Geostachys densiflora Ridl. – Perak, Pahang
- Geostachys elegans Ridl. – Peninsular Malaysia
- Geostachys erectifrons K.H.Lau, C.K.Lim & Mat-Salleh – Peninsular Malaysia
- Geostachys holttumii K.Larsen – Thailand
- Geostachys kerrii K.Larsen – Thailand
- Geostachys leucantha B.C.Stone – Peninsular Malaysia
- Geostachys maliauensis C.K.Lim & K.H.Lau – Sabah
- Geostachys megaphylla Holttum – Peninsular Malaysia
- Geostachys montana (Ridl.) Holttum – Peninsular Malaysia
- Geostachys penangensis Ridl. – Pulau Pinang
- Geostachys pierreana Gagnep. – Vietnam, Cambodia
- Geostachys primulina Ridl. – Peninsular Malaysia
- Geostachys rupestris Ridl. – Peninsular Malaysia
- Geostachys secunda (Baker) Ridl. – Peninsular Malaysia
- Geostachys sericea (Ridl.) Holttum – Peninsular Malaysia
- Geostachys smitinandii K.Larsen – Thailand
- Geostachys sumatrana Valeton – Sumatra
- Geostachys tahanensis Holttum – Pahang
- Geostachys taipingensis Holttum – Peninsular Malaysia
- Geostachys tratensis Picheans. & Mayoe – Thailand
