= Meistera =

Scientific classification
- Kingdom: Plantae
- Clade: Tracheophytes
- Clade: Angiosperms
- Clade: Monocots
- Clade: Commelinids
- Order: Zingiberales
- Family: Zingiberaceae
- Subfamily: Alpinioideae
- Tribe: Alpinieae
- Genus: Meistera; Giseke

Genus of flowering plants

Meistera is an Asian genus of plants in the family Zingiberaceae. Species have been recorded from Tropical & Subtropical Asia to northern Queensland.

== Species ==
Plants of the World Online currently includes:

- Meistera aculeata (Roxb.) Skornick. & M.F.Newman
- Meistera acuminata (Thwaites) Skornick. & M.F.Newman
- Meistera agastyamalayana (V.P.Thomas & M.Sabu) Skornick. & M.F.Newman
- Meistera benthamiana (Trim.) Skornick. & M.F.Newman
- Meistera botryoidea (Cowley) Skornick. & M.F.Newman
- Meistera calcarata (Lamxay & M.F.Newman) Skornick. & M.F.Newman
- Meistera cannicarpa (Wight) Skornick. & M.F.Newman
- Meistera celsa (Lamxay & M.F.Newman) Skornick. & M.F.Newman
- Meistera cerasina (Ridl.) Skornick. & M.F.Newman
- Meistera chinensis (Chun ex T.L.Wu) Skornick. & M.F.Newman
- Meistera dallachyi (F.Muell.) Skornick. & M.F.Newman
- Meistera deoriana (D.P.Dam & N.Dam) Skornick. & M.F.Newman
- Meistera echinocarpa (Alston) Skornick. & M.F.Newman
- Meistera elephantorum (Pierre ex Gagnep.) Skornick. & M.F.Newman
- Meistera fulviceps (Thwaites) Skornick. & M.F.Newman
- Meistera gagnepainii (T.L.Wu, K.Larsen & Turland) Skornick. & M.F.Newman
- Meistera ghatica (K.G.Bhat) Skornick. & M.F.Newman
- Meistera graminifolia (Thwaites) Skornick. & M.F.Newman
- Meistera gyrolophos (R.M.Sm.) Skornick. & M.F.Newman
- Meistera kinabaluensis (R.M.Sm.) Skornick. & M.F.Newman
- Meistera koenigii (J.F.Gmel.) Skornick. & M.F.Newman
- Meistera lappacea (Ridl.) Skornick. & M.F.Newman
- Meistera loheri (K.Schum.) Skornick. & M.F.Newman
- Meistera masticatorium (Thwaites) Skornick. & M.F.Newman
- Meistera mentawaiensis (A.J.Droop) Skornick. & M.F.Newman
- Meistera mizoramensis (M.Sabu, V.P.Thomas & Vanchh.) Skornick. & M.F.Newman
- Meistera muricarpa (Elmer) Skornick. & M.F.Newman
- Meistera newmanii (M.Sabu & V.P.Thomas) Skornick. & M.F.Newman
- Meistera nilgirica (V.P.Thomas & M.Sabu) Skornick. & M.F.Newman
- Meistera ochrea (Ridl.) Skornick. & M.F.Newman
- Meistera oligantha (K.Schum.) Skornick. & M.F.Newman
- Meistera propinqua (Ridl.) Skornick. & M.F.Newman
- Meistera sahyadrica (V.P.Thomas & M.Sabu) Skornick. & M.F.Newman
- Meistera sceletescens (R.M.Sm.) Skornick. & M.F.Newman
- Meistera stephanocolea (Lamxay & M.F.Newman) Skornick. & M.F.Newman
- Meistera tomrey (Gagnep.) Skornick. & M.F.Newman
- Meistera trichostachya (Alston) Skornick. & M.F.Newman
- Meistera vermana (S.Tripathi & V.Prakash) Skornick. & M.F.Newman
- Meistera verrucosa (S.Q.Tong) Skornick. & M.F.Newman
- Meistera vespertilio (Gagnep.) Skornick. & M.F.Newman
- Meistera yunannensis (S.Q.Tong) Skornick. & M.F.Newman
