= Perakalia =

Scientific classification
- Kingdom: Plantae
- Clade: Tracheophytes
- Clade: Angiosperms
- Clade: Monocots
- Clade: Commelinids
- Order: Zingiberales
- Family: Zingiberaceae
- Genus: Perakalia; C.K.Lim (2016)
- Species: P. perakensis

Binomial name
- Perakalia perakensis C.K.Lim (2016)

Genus of flowering plants

Perakalia perakensis is a species of flowering plant in the ginger family, Zingiberaceae. It is the sole species in genus Perakalia. It is a rhizomatous geophyte endemic to Peninsular Malaysia.
