= Epiamomum =

Scientific classification
- Kingdom: Plantae
- Clade: Tracheophytes
- Clade: Angiosperms
- Clade: Monocots
- Clade: Commelinids
- Order: Zingiberales
- Family: Zingiberaceae
- Subfamily: Alpinioideae
- Tribe: Alpinieae
- Genus: Epiamomum; A.D.Poulsen & Škorničk., 2018

Type species
- Epiamomum angustipetalum (S.Sakai & Nagam.) A.D.Poulsen & Škorničk., 2018

Genus of flowering plants

Epiamomum is a genus of plants in the family Zingiberaceae and tribe Alpinieae; all records to date are from Borneo island. Before 2018, some species were placed in the genus Amomum.

== Species ==
Plants of the World Online includes:

1. Epiamomum angustipetalum (S.Sakai & Nagam.) A.D.Poulsen & Škorničk., 2018
2. Epiamomum borneense (K.Schum.) A.D.Poulsen & Škorničk., 2018
3. Epiamomum epiphyticum (R.M.Sm.) A.D.Poulsen & Škorničk., 2018
4. Epiamomum hansenii (R.M.Sm.) A.D.Poulsen & Škorničk., 2018
5. Epiamomum pungens (R.M.Sm.) A.D.Poulsen & Škorničk., 2018
6. Epiamomum roseisquamosum (Nagam. & S.Sakai) A.D.Poulsen & Škorničk., 2018
