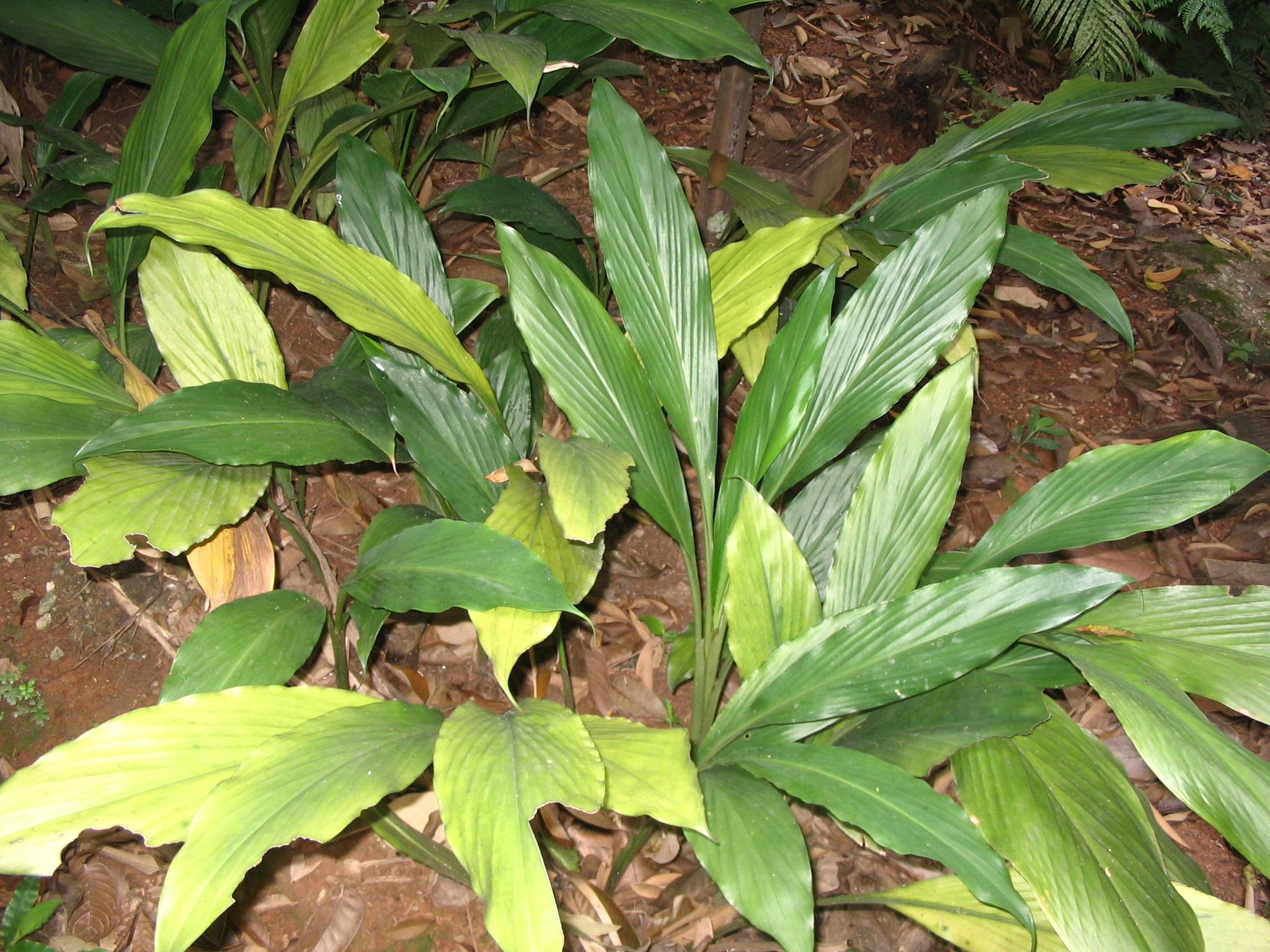
- Elettariopsis curtisii

Scientific classification
- Kingdom: Plantae
- Clade: Tracheophytes
- Clade: Angiosperms
- Clade: Monocots
- Clade: Commelinids
- Order: Zingiberales
- Family: Zingiberaceae
- Subfamily: Alpinioideae
- Tribe: Alpinieae
- Genus: Elettariopsis; Baker in J.D.Hooker

Type species
- Elettariopsis curtisii Baker

= Elettariopsis =

Extinct genus of flowering plants

Elettariopsis was a genus of plants in the ginger family, that has now been subsumed into the genus Amomum. Species are native to Southeast Asia, southern China and New Guinea.

== Species previously placed here ==
1. Elettariopsis burttiana Y.K.Kam - Perak
2. Elettariopsis chayaniana Yupparach - Thailand
3. Elettariopsis curtisii Baker in J.D.Hooker - Thailand, Malaysia, Borneo
4. Elettariopsis elan C.K.Lim - Thailand, Malaysia
5. Elettariopsis exserta (Scort.) Baker in J.D.Hooker - Thailand, Malaysia
6. Elettariopsis kandariensis (K.Schum.) Loes. in H.G.A.Engler - Sulawesi
7. Elettariopsis kerbyi R.M.Sm. - Sarawak
8. Elettariopsis latiflora Ridl. - Malaysia
9. Elettariopsis limiana Picheans. & Yupparach - Thailand
10. Elettariopsis monophylla (Gagnep.) Loes. in H.G.A.Engler - Laos, Thailand, Hainan
11. Elettariopsis poonsakiana Picheans. & Yupparach - Thailand
12. Elettariopsis procurrens (Gagnep.) Loes. in H.G.A.Engler - New Guinea
13. Elettariopsis puberula Ridl. - Sumatra
14. Elettariopsis ranongensis Picheans. & Yupparach - Thailand
15. Elettariopsis rugosa (Y.K.Kam) C.K.Lim - Selangor
16. Elettariopsis slahmong C.K.Lim - Thailand, Malaysia
17. Elettariopsis smithiae Y.K.Kam - Thailand, Malaysia
18. Elettariopsis stenosiphon (K.Schum.) B.L.Burtt & R.M.Sm. - Sarawak
19. Elettariopsis sumatrana Valeton - Sumatra
20. Elettariopsis triloba (Gagnep.) Loes. in H.G.A.Engler - Laos, Thailand, Vietnam
21. Elettariopsis unifolia (Gagnep.) M.F.Newman - Vietnam
22. Elettariopsis wandokthong Picheans. & Yupparach - Thailand
