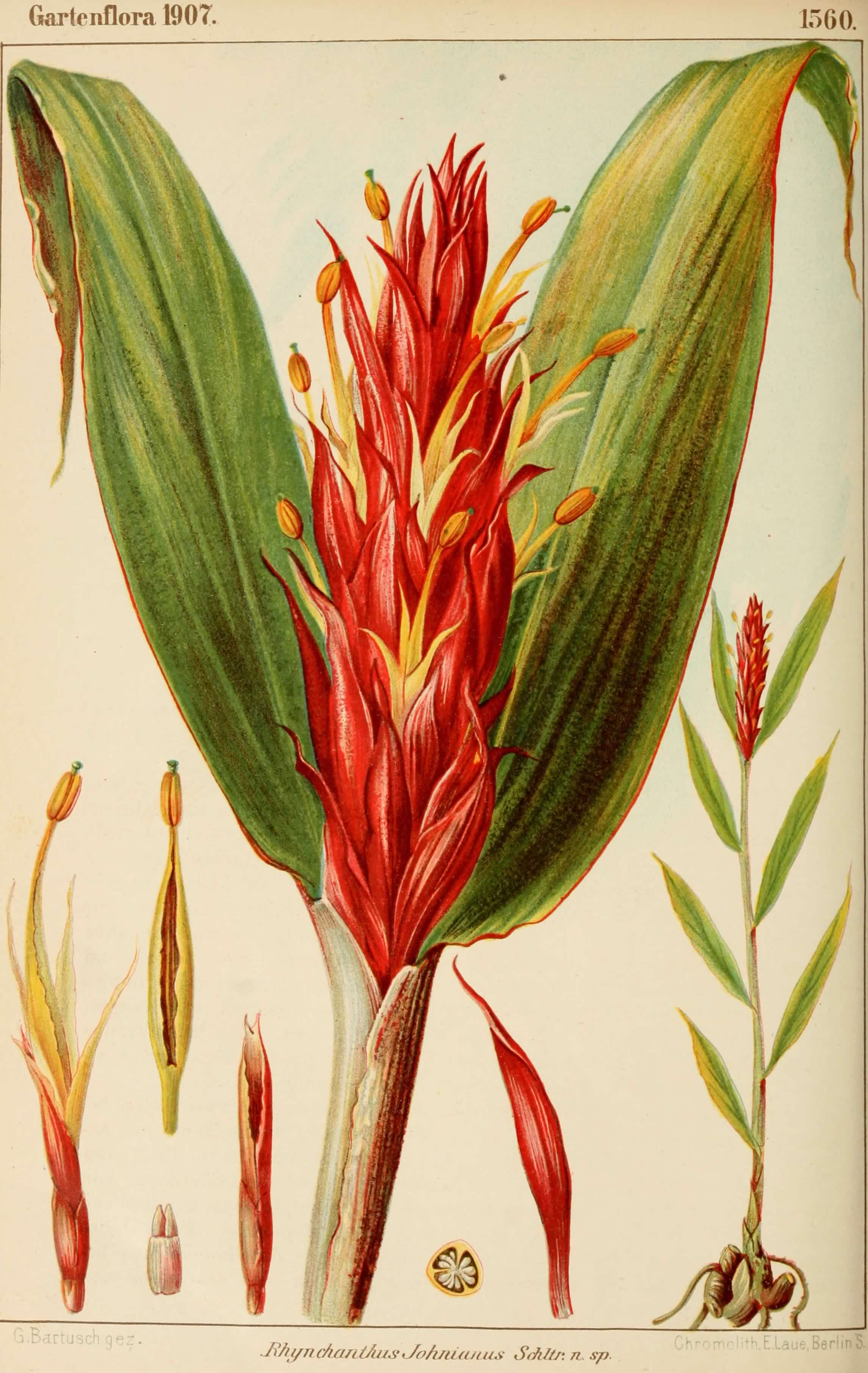
- Rhynchanthus johnianus

Scientific classification
- Kingdom: Plantae
- Clade: Tracheophytes
- Clade: Angiosperms
- Clade: Monocots
- Clade: Commelinids
- Order: Zingiberales
- Family: Zingiberaceae
- Subfamily: Zingiberoideae
- Tribe: Zingibereae
- Genus: Rhynchanthus; Hook.f.

Type species
- Rhynchanthus longiflorus Hook.f.

= Rhynchanthus =

Genus of flowering plants

Rhynchanthus is a genus of flowering plants in the ginger family. It is native to Yunnan, Myanmar, and the Assam region of eastern India.

== Species ==
- Rhynchanthus beesianus W.W.Sm. - Yunnan, Myanmar
- Rhynchanthus bluthianus Wittm. - Myanmar
- Rhynchanthus johnianus Schltr. - Myanmar
- Rhynchanthus longiflorus Hook.f. - Myanmar, Assam

formerly included

- Rhynchanthus papuanus Gilli = Hellwigia acuminata (R.M.Sm.) Senjaya & A.D.Poulsen
- Rhynchanthus radicalis Valeton = Geocharis radicalis (Valeton) B.L.Burtt & R.M.Sm.
- Rhynchanthus wiesemannianus Loes. & Schlechter - unresolved name
