= Nanochilus =

Scientific classification
- Kingdom: Plantae
- Clade: Tracheophytes
- Clade: Angiosperms
- Clade: Monocots
- Clade: Commelinids
- Order: Zingiberales
- Family: Zingiberaceae
- Subfamily: Zingiberoideae
- Tribe: Zingibereae
- Genus: Nanochilus; K.Schum.
- Species: N. palembanicus

Binomial name
- Nanochilus palembanicus (Miq.) K.Schum.

Synonyms
- Hedychium palembanicum Miq; Gandasulium palembanicum (Miq.) Kuntze; Gandasulium sumatranum (Jack) Kuntze

Genus of flowering plants

Nanochilus is a genus of plants in the ginger family. It contains only one known species, Nanochilus palembanicus, endemic to Sumatra.
