= Siliquamomum =

Scientific classification
- Kingdom: Plantae
- Clade: Tracheophytes
- Clade: Angiosperms
- Clade: Monocots
- Clade: Commelinids
- Order: Zingiberales
- Family: Zingiberaceae
- Tribe: Alpinieae
- Genus: Siliquamomum; Baill.

Type species
- Siliquamomum tonkinense Baill.

Genus of flowering plants

Siliquamomum is a genus of plants in the Zingiberaceae.

== Species ==
Known species are native to Vietnam and southern China.

- Siliquamomum alcicorne Škorničk. & H.Đ.Trần
- Siliquamomum oreodoxa N.S.Lý & Škorničk - Vietnam
- Siliquamomum phamhoangii Luu & H.Đ.Trần
- Siliquamomum tonkinense Baill.. - Vietnam, Yunnan
