= Camptandra =

Scientific classification
- Kingdom: Plantae
- Clade: Tracheophytes
- Clade: Angiosperms
- Clade: Monocots
- Clade: Commelinids
- Order: Zingiberales
- Family: Zingiberaceae
- Subfamily: Zingiberoideae
- Tribe: Zingibereae
- Genus: Camptandra; Ridl.

Type species
- Camptandra latifolia Ridl.

Genus of flowering plants

Camptandra is a genus of flowering plants in the ginger family, Zingiberaceae. It contains 4 known species, all endemic to Malaysia.

== Species ==
- Camptandra gracillima (K.Schum.) Valeton - Sarawak
- Camptandra latifolia Ridl. - Peninsular Malaysia
- Camptandra ovata Ridl. - Peninsular Malaysia
- Camptandra parvula (King ex Baker) Ridl. - Peninsular Malaysia
