= Tamijia =

Scientific classification
- Kingdom: Plantae
- Clade: Tracheophytes
- Clade: Angiosperms
- Clade: Monocots
- Clade: Commelinids
- Order: Zingiberales
- Family: Zingiberaceae
- Subfamily: Tamijioideae
- Tribe: Tamijieae
- Genus: Tamijia; S.Sakai & Nagam.
- Species: T. flagellaris

Binomial name
- Tamijia flagellaris S.Sakai & Nagam.

Plant genus in the ginger family

Tamijia flagellaris is the only species within the genus Tamijia. It is part of the family Zingiberaceae (the ginger family).

== Distribution ==
It is native to Brunei and Malaysia.

== Habitat and ecology ==
Typically found in drier soil that most plants in the ginger family. It is most abundant in shaded and closed canopy environments.

== Description ==
It contains a poorly developed pseudostem and can contain 2 to 7 leaves on each shoot. The leaves are obliquely and narrowly obovate, they are arranged distichously. There are small hairs on the apex and near the midrib on the bottom side of its leaves, other than these small hairs the leaves are glabrous on both sides. The apex of the leaves are acute and the base is attenuate. The petiole can reach 6–17 cm in length and is also glabrous.

=== Flowers and fruit ===
Most commonly it has radial inflorescence, but it also rarely has terminal inflorescence.
