= Pommereschea =

Scientific classification
- Kingdom: Plantae
- Clade: Tracheophytes
- Clade: Angiosperms
- Clade: Monocots
- Clade: Commelinids
- Order: Zingiberales
- Family: Zingiberaceae
- Subfamily: Zingiberoideae
- Tribe: Zingibereae
- Genus: Pommereschea; Wittm.

Type species
- Pommereschea lackneri Wittm.

Synonyms
- Croftia King & Prain

Genus of flowering plants

Pommereschea is a genus of plants in the ginger family. There are two known species, native to China and Indochina:

- Pommereschea lackneri Wittm. - Yunnan, Myanmar, Thailand
- Pommereschea spectabilis (King & Prain) K.Schum. in H.G.A.Engler - Yunnan, Myanmar
