= Conamomum =

Scientific classification
- Kingdom: Plantae
- Clade: Tracheophytes
- Clade: Angiosperms
- Clade: Monocots
- Clade: Commelinids
- Order: Zingiberales
- Family: Zingiberaceae
- Subfamily: Alpinioideae
- Tribe: Alpinieae
- Genus: Conamomum; Ridl., 1899

Synonyms
- Amomum

Genus of flowering plants

Conamomum is a genus of flowering plants in the family Zingiberaceae and tribe Alpinieae. Its native range is from Indochina to western Malesia.

== Species ==
Plants of the World Online currently includes:

1. Conamomum citrinum Ridl. - type species
2. Conamomum cylindraceum (Ridl.) Skornick. & A.D.Poulsen
3. Conamomum cylindrostachys (K.Schum.) Skornick. & A.D.Poulsen
4. Conamomum flavidulum (Ridl.) Skornick. & A.D.Poulsen
5. Conamomum pierreanum (Gagnep.) Skornick. & A.D.Poulsen
6. Conamomum rubidum (Lamxay & N.S.Lý) Skornick. & A.D.Poulsen
7. Conamomum spiceum (Ridl.) Skornick. & A.D.Poulsen
8. Conamomum squarrosum (Ridl.) Skornick. & A.D.Poulsen
9. Conamomum utriculosum Ridl.
10. Conamomum xanthophlebium (Baker) Skornick. & A.D.Poulsen
11. Conamomum vietnamense N.S.Lý et al.
