= Distichochlamys =

Scientific classification
- Kingdom: Plantae
- Clade: Tracheophytes
- Clade: Angiosperms
- Clade: Monocots
- Clade: Commelinids
- Order: Zingiberales
- Family: Zingiberaceae
- Subfamily: Zingiberoideae
- Tribe: Zingibereae
- Genus: Distichochlamys; M.F.Newman

Type species
- Distichochlamys citrea M.F.Newman

Genus of flowering plants

Distichochlamys is a genus of plants in the ginger family. It has 4 known species, all endemic to Vietnam.

- Distichochlamys benenica Q.B.Nguyen & Skornick.
- Distichochlamys citrea M.F.Newman
- Distichochlamys orlowii K.Larsen & M.F.Newman
- Distichochlamys rubrostriata W.J.Kress & Rehse
