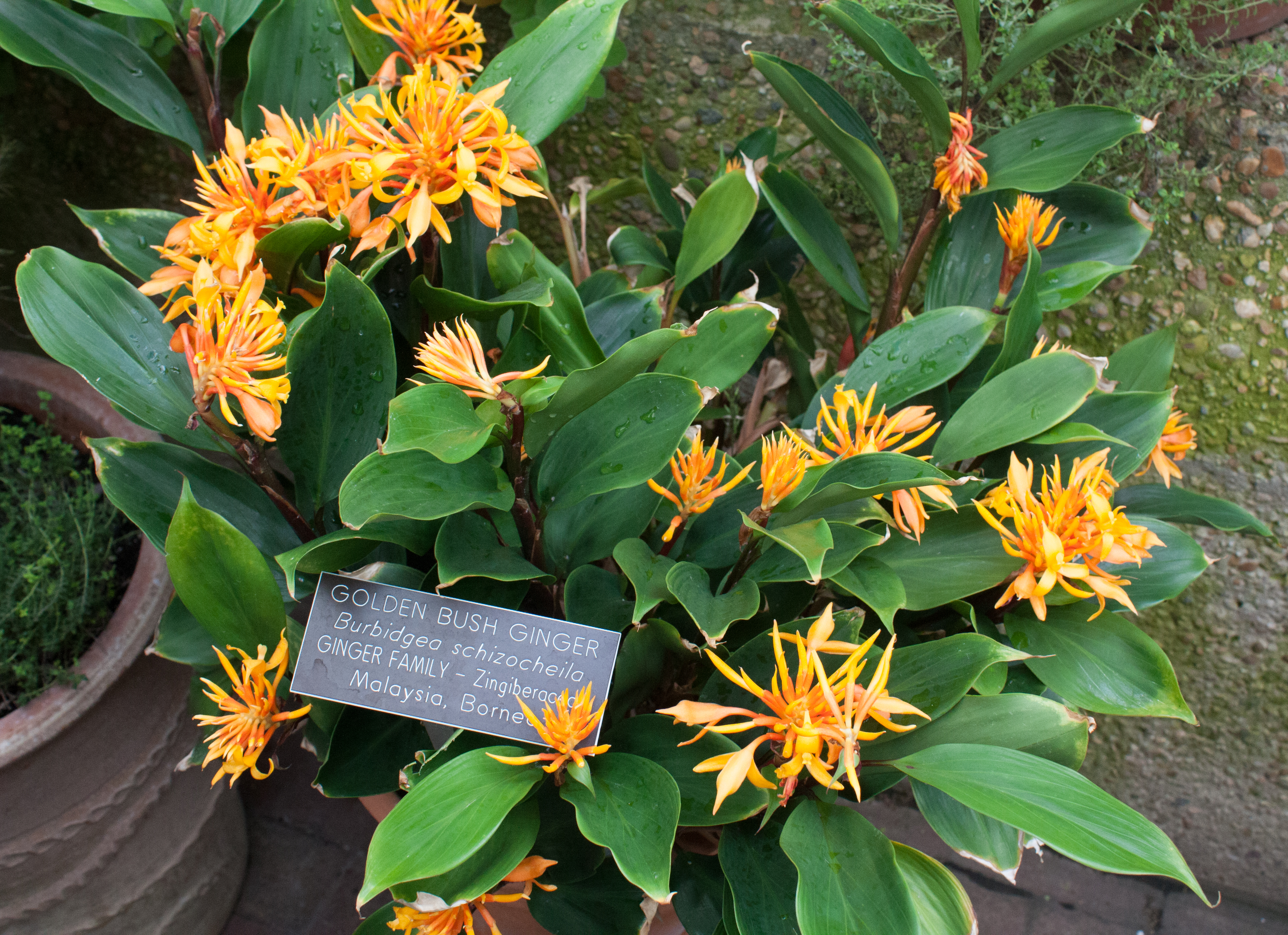
- Burbidgea schizocheila - Golden brush ginger

Scientific classification
- Kingdom: Plantae
- Clade: Tracheophytes
- Clade: Angiosperms
- Clade: Monocots
- Clade: Commelinids
- Order: Zingiberales
- Family: Zingiberaceae
- Subfamily: Alpinioideae
- Tribe: Riedelieae
- Genus: Burbidgea; Hook.f.

= Burbidgea =

Genus of flowering plants

Burbidgea is a genus of plants in the family Zingiberaceae. There are five known species, all endemic to the island of Borneo.

Species accepted:

- Burbidgea longiflora (Ridl.) R.M.Sm. — Sarawak
- Burbidgea nitida Hook.f. — Sarawak
- Burbidgea pauciflora Valeton — Borneo
- Burbidgea schizocheila Hackett — Sabah, Sarawak
- Burbidgea stenantha Ridl. — Borneo
