= Leptosolena =

Scientific classification
- Kingdom: Plantae
- Clade: Tracheophytes
- Clade: Angiosperms
- Clade: Monocots
- Clade: Commelinids
- Order: Zingiberales
- Family: Zingiberaceae
- Subfamily: Alpinioideae
- Tribe: Alpinieae
- Genus: Leptosolena; C.Presl
- Species: L. haenkei

Binomial name
- Leptosolena haenkei C.Presl

Synonyms
- Alpinia leptosolenia K.Schum. in H.G.A.Engler; Leptosolena insignis Ridl.; Leptosolena auriculata Elmer

Genus of flowering plants

Leptosolena is a genus of plants in the Zingiberaceae. It has only one known species, Leptosolena haenkei, endemic to the island of Luzon in the Philippines.

It is known as "panawil" in the Ilocos Region. In upland areas its flowers are gathered after the start of rainy season and cooked as vegetables and considered as a rare delicacy. Its unripe fruits are edible as its pulp is eaten raw and it has a spicy, astringent taste and menthol-like, and lemony flavor.

== Discovery ==
The species was discovered in 1792 by the Czech traveller and botanist Thaddaeus Haenke, member of the Malaspina Expedition, the first ever scientific expedition to the Philippines. The boxes with collections of the expedition were sent to Europe by Haenke who stuck in Bolivia never to return home. In 1821 they were found partially rotting in Cadiz in Spain by members of the Czech National Museum, bought out, brought to Prague and organized, including the type specimen of Leptosolena.

The species was named by Karel Presl, director of the Botanical Department of the Czech National Museum who organized the whole Haenke collection from the Malaspina expedition which made its way to Prague (15.000 specimen), while another part, deposited in Madrid herbarium is unknown now. The type specimen collected by Haenke personally in 1792 is deposited in the Czech National Museum in Prague, which also donated some specimen to herbariums abroad like the Smithsonian in USA.

== Rare species ==
The species is very rare. It was seen first and last time by Haenke in 1792. Since then it was thought to be extinct for 213 years until it was rediscovered in the wild in 2005 by the Japanese botanist Funakoshi Hidenobu.
