= Stadiochilus =

Scientific classification
- Kingdom: Plantae
- Clade: Tracheophytes
- Clade: Angiosperms
- Clade: Monocots
- Clade: Commelinids
- Order: Zingiberales
- Family: Zingiberaceae
- Subfamily: Zingiberoideae
- Tribe: Zingibereae
- Genus: Stadiochilus; R.M.Sm
- Species: S. burmanicus

Binomial name
- Stadiochilus burmanicus R.M.Sm

Genus of flowering plants

Stadiochilus is a genus of plants in the ginger family. It contains only one known species, Stadiochilus burmanicus, first described by Rosemary Margaret Smith in 1980 and endemic to Myanmar (Burma).
