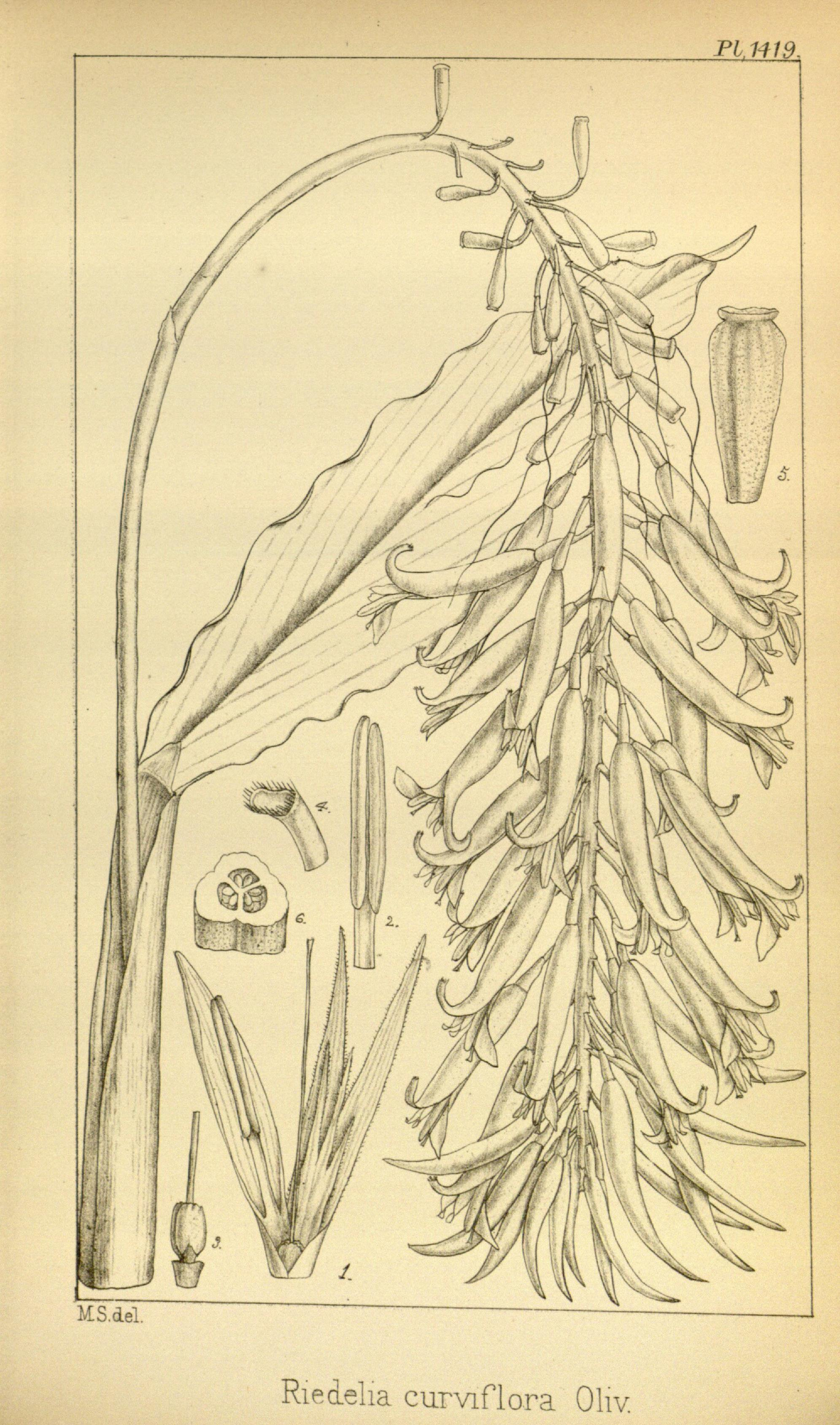
- Riedelia curviflora

Scientific classification
- Kingdom: Plantae
- Clade: Tracheophytes
- Clade: Angiosperms
- Clade: Monocots
- Clade: Commelinids
- Order: Zingiberales
- Family: Zingiberaceae
- Subfamily: Alpinioideae
- Tribe: Riedelieae
- Genus: Riedelia; Oliv., conserved name

Type species
- Riedelia curviflora Oliv.

Synonyms
- Nyctophylax Zipp., rejected name; Rudelia Oliv., spelling variant; Naumannia Warb.; Oliverodoxa Kuntze; Thylacophora Ridl.

= Riedelia (plant) =

Genus of flowering plants

Riedelia is a genus of plants in the family Zingiberaceae. The genus contains approximately 75 species that are distributed among New Guinea, the Solomon Islands, and Maluku Province in eastern Indonesia. Among the described species is Riedelia charontis, which was formally described in 2010.

== Species ==
The following species are listed in Plants of the World Online:

- Riedelia affinis (Ridl.) K.Schum.
- Riedelia alata Valeton
- Riedelia albertisii (K.Schum.) K.Schum.
- Riedelia angustifolia Valeton
- Riedelia areolata Valeton
- Riedelia arfakensis Valeton
- Riedelia aurantiaca Ridl.
- Riedelia bicuspis Ridl.
- Riedelia bidentata Valeton
- Riedelia bismarcki-montium K.Schum.
- Riedelia brachybotrys Valeton
- Riedelia branderhorstii Valeton
- Riedelia brevicornu Valeton
- Riedelia brunneopilosa Govaerts
- Riedelia capillidens Gilli
- Riedelia charontis M.F.Newman
- Riedelia corallina (K.Schum.) Valeton
- Riedelia cordylinoides (Ridl.) R.M.Sm.
- Riedelia curcumoidea P.Royen
- Riedelia curviflora Oliv.
- Riedelia decurva (Ridl.) Valeton
- Riedelia dolichopteron Valeton
- Riedelia epiphytica Valeton
- Riedelia erecta Valeton
- Riedelia eupteron Valeton
- Riedelia exalata Valeton
- Riedelia ferruginea Valeton
- Riedelia flava Lauterb. ex Valeton
- Riedelia fulgens Valeton
- Riedelia geanthus Valeton
- Riedelia geluensis Valeton
- Riedelia geminiflora Valeton
- Riedelia graminea Valeton
- Riedelia grandiligula Valeton
- Riedelia hirtella Ridl.
- Riedelia hollandiae Valeton
- Riedelia insignis (Warb.) K.Schum.
- Riedelia klossii Ridl.
- Riedelia lanata (Scheff.) K.Schum. ex Valeton
- Riedelia lanatiligulata Ridl.
- Riedelia latiligula Valeton
- Riedelia ligulata Ridl.
- Riedelia longifolia Valeton
- Riedelia longirostra Valeton
- Riedelia longisepala Ridl.
- Riedelia macranthoides Valeton
- Riedelia macrothyrsa Valeton
- Riedelia maculata Valeton
- Riedelia marafungensis P.Royen
- Riedelia maxima Valeton
- Riedelia microbotrya Valeton
- Riedelia minor Valeton
- Riedelia monophylla K.Schum.
- Riedelia montana Valeton
- Riedelia monticola Valeton
- Riedelia nymanii K.Schum.
- Riedelia orchioides (K.Schum.) Valeton
- Riedelia paniculata Valeton
- Riedelia plectophylla (K.Schum.) Govaerts
- Riedelia pterocalyx (K.Schum.) Valeton
- Riedelia pulcherrima Ridl.
- Riedelia purpurata Ridl.
- Riedelia rigidocalyx Lauterb. ex Valeton
- Riedelia robusta Valeton
- Riedelia rosacea P.Royen
- Riedelia schlechteri Valeton
- Riedelia sessilanthera Valeton
- Riedelia stricta K.Schum.
- Riedelia subalpina P.Royen
- Riedelia suborbicularis P.Royen
- Riedelia subulocalyx Valeton
- Riedelia tenuifolia Valeton
- Riedelia triciliata Ridl.
- Riedelia umbellata Valeton
- Riedelia urceolata Valeton
- Riedelia whitei Ridl.
- Riedelia wollastonii Ridl.
