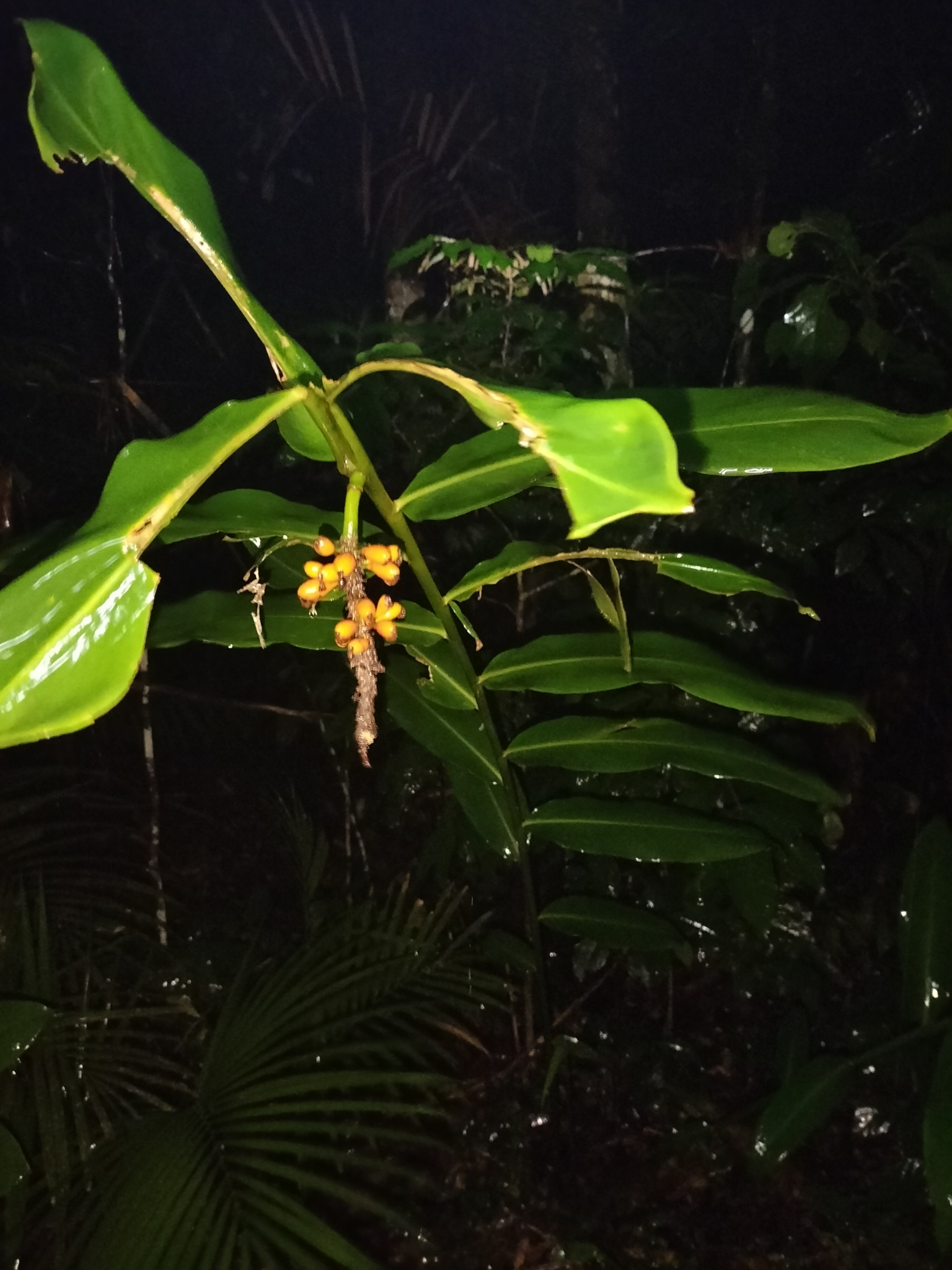
- Pleuranthodium racemigerum

Scientific classification
- Kingdom: Plantae
- Clade: Tracheophytes
- Clade: Angiosperms
- Clade: Monocots
- Clade: Commelinids
- Order: Zingiberales
- Family: Zingiberaceae
- Subfamily: Alpinioideae
- Tribe: Riedelieae
- Genus: Pleuranthodium (K.Schum.) R.M.Sm.

Synonyms
- Alpinia sect. Pleuranthodium K. Schum.; Psychanthus (K.Schum.) Ridl. 1916, illegitimate homonym, not Raf. 1814

= Pleuranthodium =

Genus of plants

Pleuranthodium is a genus of flowering plants in the ginger family Zingiberaceae. Of the 23 known species, 21 are endemic to New Guinea, one to Queensland and one to the Bismarck Archipelago.

== Species ==
- Pleuranthodium biligulatum (Valeton) R.M.Sm. - New Guinea
- Pleuranthodium branderhorstii (Valeton) R.M.Sm. - New Guinea
- Pleuranthodium comptum (K.Schum.) R.M.Sm. - New Guinea
- Pleuranthodium floccosum (Valeton) R.M.Sm. - New Guinea
- Pleuranthodium floribundum (K.Schum.) R.M.Sm. - New Guinea
- Pleuranthodium gjellerupii (Valeton) R.M.Sm. - New Guinea
- Pleuranthodium hellwigii (K.Schum.) R.M.Sm. - New Guinea
- Pleuranthodium iboense (Valeton) R.M.Sm. - New Guinea
- Pleuranthodium macropycnanthum (Valeton) R.M.Sm. - New Guinea
- Pleuranthodium neragaimae (Gilli) R.M.Sm. - New Guinea
- Pleuranthodium papilionaceum (K.Schum.) R.M.Sm. - New Guinea
- Pleuranthodium pedicellatum (Valeton) R.M.Sm. - New Guinea
- Pleuranthodium peekelii (Valeton) R.M.Sm. - Bismarck Archipelago
- Pleuranthodium pelecystylum (K.Schum.) R.M.Sm. - New Guinea
- Pleuranthodium piundaundensis (P.Royen) R.M.Sm. - New Guinea
- Pleuranthodium platynema (K.Schum.) R.M.Sm. - New Guinea
- Pleuranthodium pterocarpum (K.Schum.) R.M.Sm. - New Guinea
- Pleuranthodium racemigerum (F.Muell.) R.M.Sm. - Queensland
- Pleuranthodium roemeri (Valeton) R.M.Sm. - New Guinea
- Pleuranthodium schlechteri (K.Schum.) R.M.Sm. - New Guinea
- Pleuranthodium scyphonema (K.Schum.) R.M.Sm. - New Guinea
- Pleuranthodium tephrochlamys (K.Schum. & Lauterb.) R.M.Sm. - New Guinea
- Pleuranthodium trichocalyx (Valeton) R.M.Sm. - New Guinea
