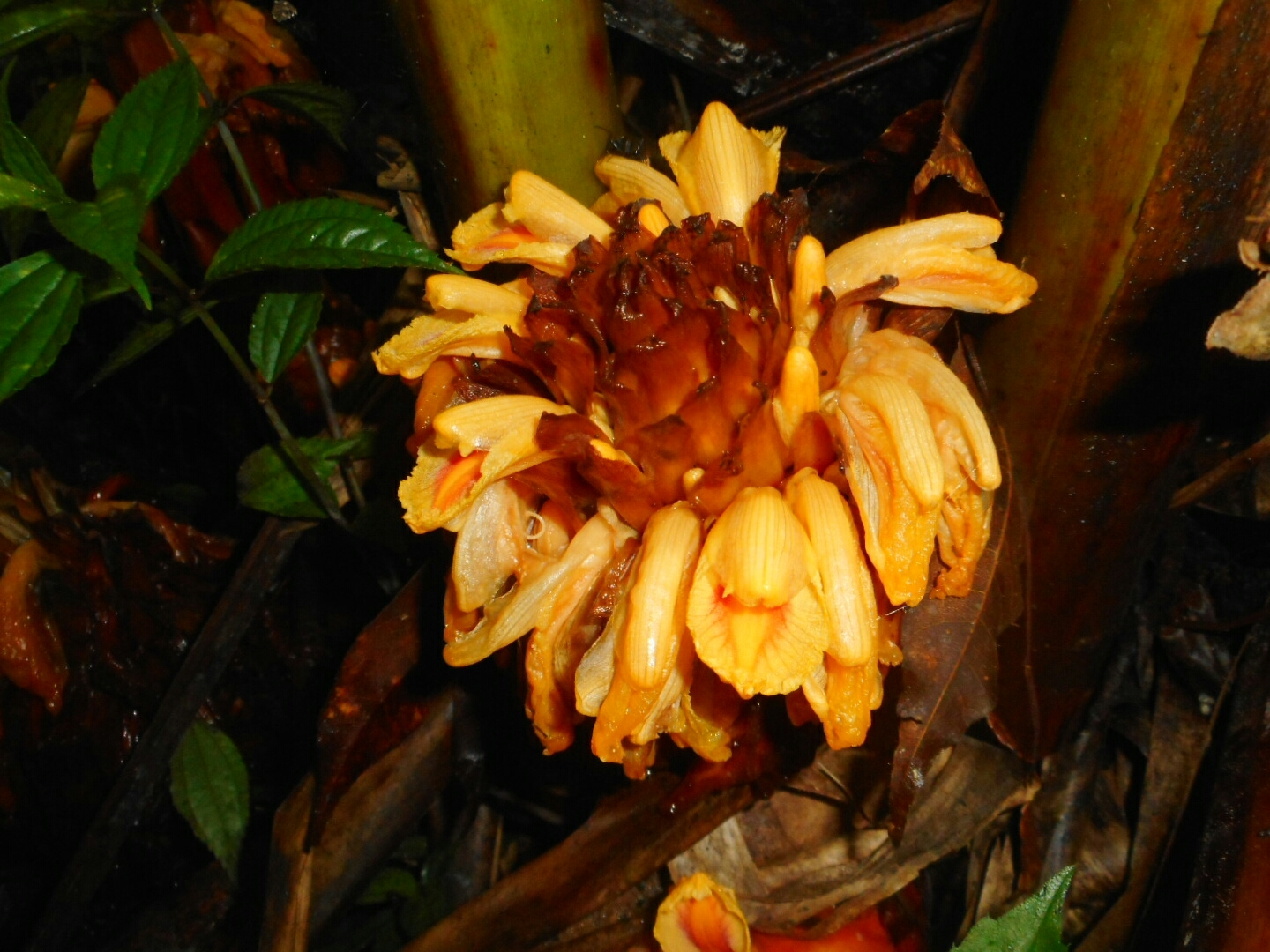
- Lanxangia tsao-ko

Scientific classification
- Kingdom: Plantae
- Clade: Tracheophytes
- Clade: Angiosperms
- Clade: Monocots
- Clade: Commelinids
- Order: Zingiberales
- Family: Zingiberaceae
- Subfamily: Alpinioideae
- Tribe: Alpinieae
- Genus: Lanxangia; M.F.Newman & Skornick.

= Lanxangia =

Genus of flowering plants

Lanxangia is an Asian genus of plants in the ginger family. Species have been recorded from southern China to Indo-China.

== Species ==
Plants of the World Online currently includes:

1. Lanxangia capsiciformis (S.Q.Tong) M.F.Newman & Skornick.
2. Lanxangia coriandriodora (S.Q.Tong & Y.M.Xia) M.F.Newman & Skornick.
3. Lanxangia jingxiensis (D.Fang & D.H.Qin) M.F.Newman & Skornick.
4. Lanxangia paratsao-ko (S.Q.Tong & Y.M.Xia) M.F.Newman & Skornick.
5. Lanxangia scarlatina (H.T.Tsai & P.S.Chen) M.F.Newman & Skornick.
6. Lanxangia thysanochilila (S.Q.Tong & Y.M.Xia) M.F.Newman & Skornick.
7. Lanxangia tsao-ko (Crevost & Lemarié) M.F.Newman & Skornick. - type species
8. Lanxangia tuberculata (D.Fang) M.F.Newman & Skornick.
