= Vanoverberghia =

Scientific classification
- Kingdom: Plantae
- Clade: Tracheophytes
- Clade: Angiosperms
- Clade: Monocots
- Clade: Commelinids
- Order: Zingiberales
- Family: Zingiberaceae
- Subfamily: Alpinioideae
- Tribe: Alpinieae
- Genus: Vanoverberghia; Merr.

Type species
- Vanoverberghia sepulchrei Merr.

Genus of flowering plants

Vanoverberghia is a genus of plants in the Zingiberaceae, named after Morice Vanoverbergh (1885–1982), a Catholic missionary priest who lived in the Philippines and was also an anthropologist and a linguist.

The genus has now have five known species, native to Taiwan and the Philippines.

- Vanoverberghia sasakiana Funak. & H.Ohashi - Taiwan (Lanyu Island, also called Orchid Island) and Philippines
- Vanoverberghia sepulchrei Merr. - Philippines
- Vanoverberghia (Alpinia) diversifolia Elmer - Luzon, Philippines
- Vanoverberghia rubrobracteata Docot & Ambida - Philippines
- Vanoverberghia (Alpinia) vanoverberghii (Merr.) Funak. & Docot - Philippines
