= Sundamomum =

Scientific classification
- Kingdom: Plantae
- Clade: Tracheophytes
- Clade: Angiosperms
- Clade: Monocots
- Clade: Commelinids
- Order: Zingiberales
- Family: Zingiberaceae
- Genus: Sundamomum; A.D.Poulsen & M.F.Newman

Genus of plants

Sundamomum is a genus of flowering plants belonging to the family Zingiberaceae.

Its native range is Thailand to Western Malesia.

Species:

- Sundamomum borealiborneense (I.M.Turner) A.D.Poulsen & M.F.Newman
- Sundamomum calyptratum (S.Sakai & Nagam.) A.D.Poulsen & M.F.Newman
- Sundamomum dictyocoleum (K.Schum.) A.D.Poulsen & M.F.Newman
- Sundamomum durum (S.Sakai & Nagam.) A.D.Poulsen & M.F.Newman
- Sundamomum flavoalbum (R.M.Sm.) A.D.Poulsen & M.F.Newman
- Sundamomum hastilabium (Ridl.) A.D.Poulsen & M.F.Newman
- Sundamomum laxesquamosum (K.Schum.) A.D.Poulsen & M.F.Newman
- Sundamomum longipedunculatum (R.M.Sm.) A.D.Poulsen & M.F.Newman
- Sundamomum luteum (R.M.Sm.) A.D.Poulsen & M.F.Newman
- Sundamomum macroglossa (K.Schum.) A.D.Poulsen & M.F.Newman
- Sundamomum oligophyllum (A.J.Droop) A.D.Poulsen & M.F.Newman
- Sundamomum paucifolium (R.M.Sm.) A.D.Poulsen & M.F.Newman
- Sundamomum pseudofoetens (Valeton) A.D.Poulsen & M.F.Newman
- Sundamomum somniculosum (S.Sakai & Nagam.) A.D.Poulsen & M.F.Newman
