= Geocharis (plant) =

Scientific classification
- Kingdom: Plantae
- Clade: Tracheophytes
- Clade: Angiosperms
- Clade: Monocots
- Clade: Commelinids
- Order: Zingiberales
- Family: Zingiberaceae
- Subfamily: Alpinioideae
- Tribe: Alpinieae
- Genus: Geocharis (K.Schum.) Ridl.

Genus of flowering plants

Geocharis is a genus of plants in the family Zingiberaceae. It is native to insular Southeast Asia (Malaysia, Indonesia, Philippines).

== Species ==
- Geocharis aurantiaca Ridl. - Johor
- Geocharis fusiformis (Ridl.) R.M.Sm. - Philippines, Sabah
- Geocharis macrostemon (K.Schum.) Holttum - Sumatra
- Geocharis radicalis (Valeton) B.L.Burtt & R.M.Sm. - Sumatra
- Geocharis rubra Ridl. - Sarawak
- Geocharis secundiflora (Ridl.) Holttum - Peninsular Malaysia
