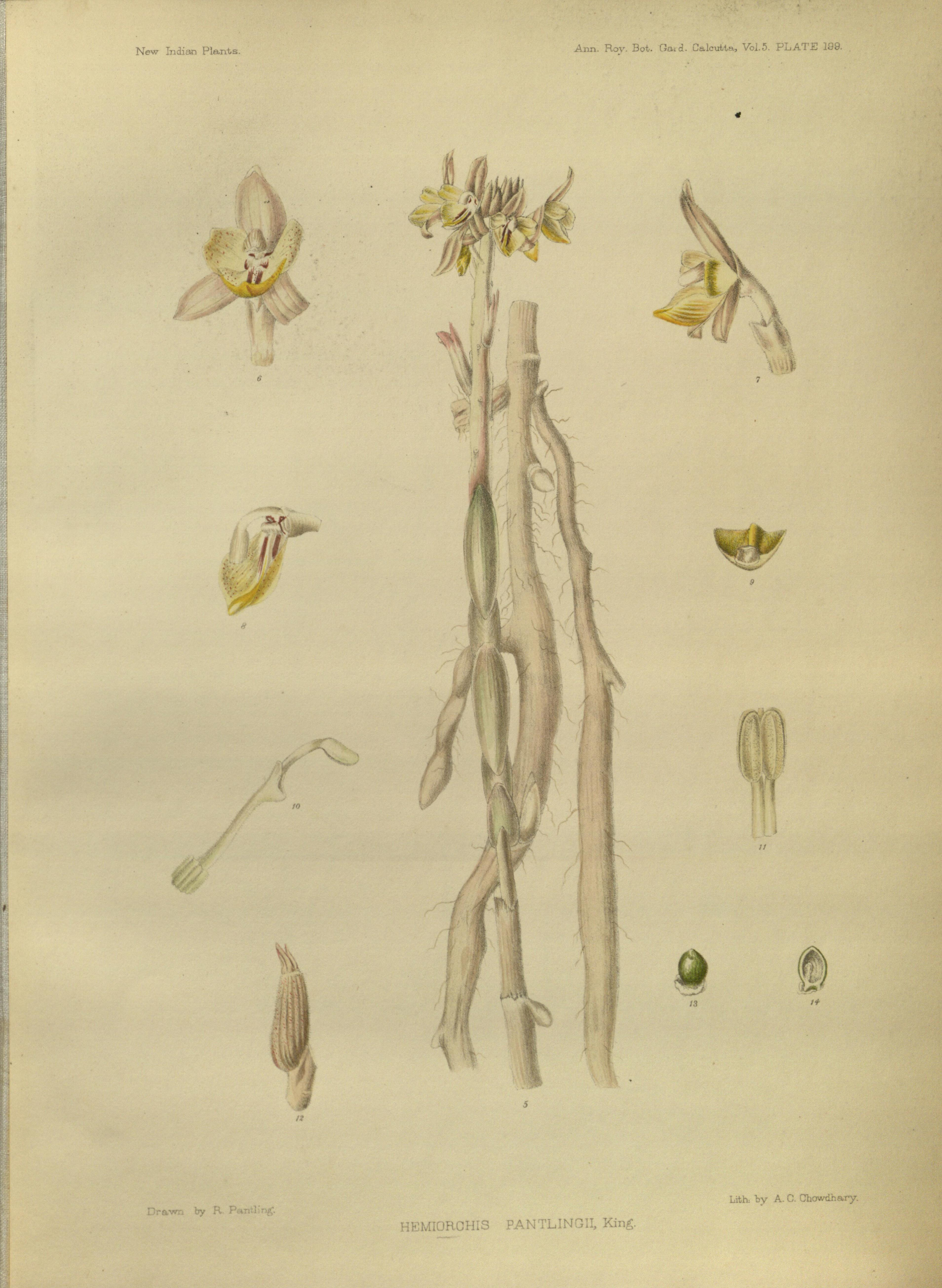
- Botanical illustration of Hemiorchis pantlingii (1895)

Scientific classification
- Kingdom: Plantae
- Clade: Tracheophytes
- Clade: Angiosperms
- Clade: Monocots
- Clade: Commelinids
- Order: Zingiberales
- Family: Zingiberaceae
- Subfamily: Zingiberoideae
- Tribe: Globbeae
- Genus: Hemiorchis; Kurz

Type species
- Hemiorchis burmanica Kurz

= Hemiorchis =

Genus of flowering plants

Hemiorchis is a genus of flowering plants in the ginger family, Zingiberaceae. It contains three recognized species, native to the eastern Himalayas from Nepal to Myanmar.

== Species ==
- Hemiorchis burmanica Kurz - Myanmar
- Hemiorchis pantlingii King - Assam, Nepal, Bhutan, Arunachal Pradesh, Myanmar
- Hemiorchis rhodorrhachis K.Schum. in H.G.A.Engler - Assam, Bhutan, Arunachal Pradesh, Myanmar
