= François Gagnepain =

French botanist (1866–1952)

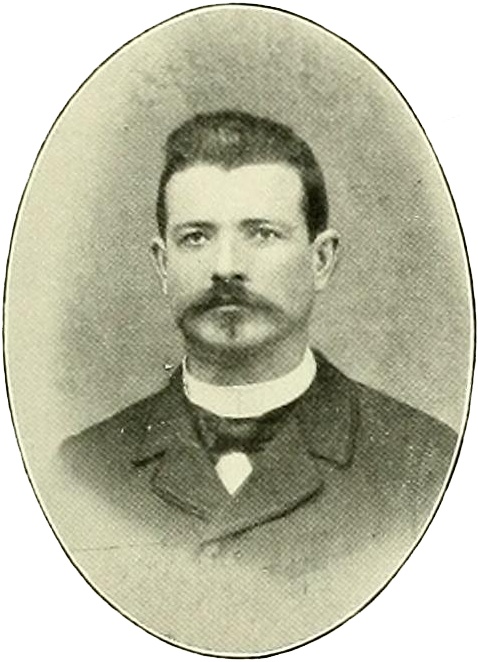
- Born: 23 September 1866; Raveau, Nièvre, France (near La Charité-sur-Loire)
- Died: 25 January 1952 (aged 85); Cannes, France
- Known for: Naming species of Annonaceae
- Awards: Prix de Coincy (French Academy of Sciences)
- Scientific career
- Fields: Botany
- Author abbrev. (botany): Gagnep.

François Gagnepain (23 September 1866 – 25 January 1952) was a French botanist. The standard botanical author abbreviation Gagnep. is applied to plants described by Gagnepain.

With Achille Eugène Finet, he named a number of species within the botanical family Annonaceae. The genus Gagnepainia (family Zingiberaceae) was named in his honor by Karl Moritz Schumann. The French Academy of Sciences awarded Gagnepain the Prix de Coincy for the year 1907.

== Selected publications ==
- Topographie botanique des environs de Cercy-la-Tour (Nièvre), Société d'histoire naturelle d'Autun, 1900 - Botanical topography involving the environs of Cercy-la-Tour (Nièvre).
- Contributions à la flore de l'Asie orientale, 1905, (in collaboration with Achille Eugène Finet) - Contributions to the flora of eastern Asia.
- Contribution à l'étude géo-botanique de l'Indo-Chine, 1926 - Contribution to the geobotanical study of Indochina.
