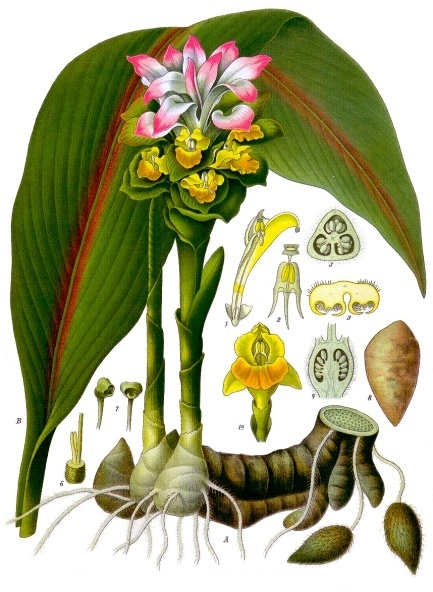
- Curcuma zedoaria

Scientific classification
- Kingdom: Plantae
- Clade: Tracheophytes
- Clade: Angiosperms
- Clade: Monocots
- Clade: Commelinids
- Order: Zingiberales
- Family: Zingiberaceae
- Subfamily: Zingiberoideae

Tribes & genera
- See text

= Zingiberoideae =

Subfamily of flowering plants

Zingiberoideae is a subfamily of plants in the family Zingiberaceae.

== Tribes & genera ==
=== Tribe Globbeae ===
- Globba (syn. Mantisia, etc.)
- Gagnepainia
- Hemiorchis

=== Tribe Zingibereae ===
- Boesenbergia
- Camptandra
- Caulokaempferia
- Cautleya
- Curcuma: includes Hitchenia & Stahlianthus
- Curcumorpha
- Haniffia
- Haplochorema
- Hedychium
- Kaempferia
- Nanochilus
- Paracautleya
- Parakaempferia
- Pommereschea
- Rhynchanthus
- Roscoea
- Scaphochlamys
- Stadiochilus
- Zingiber
