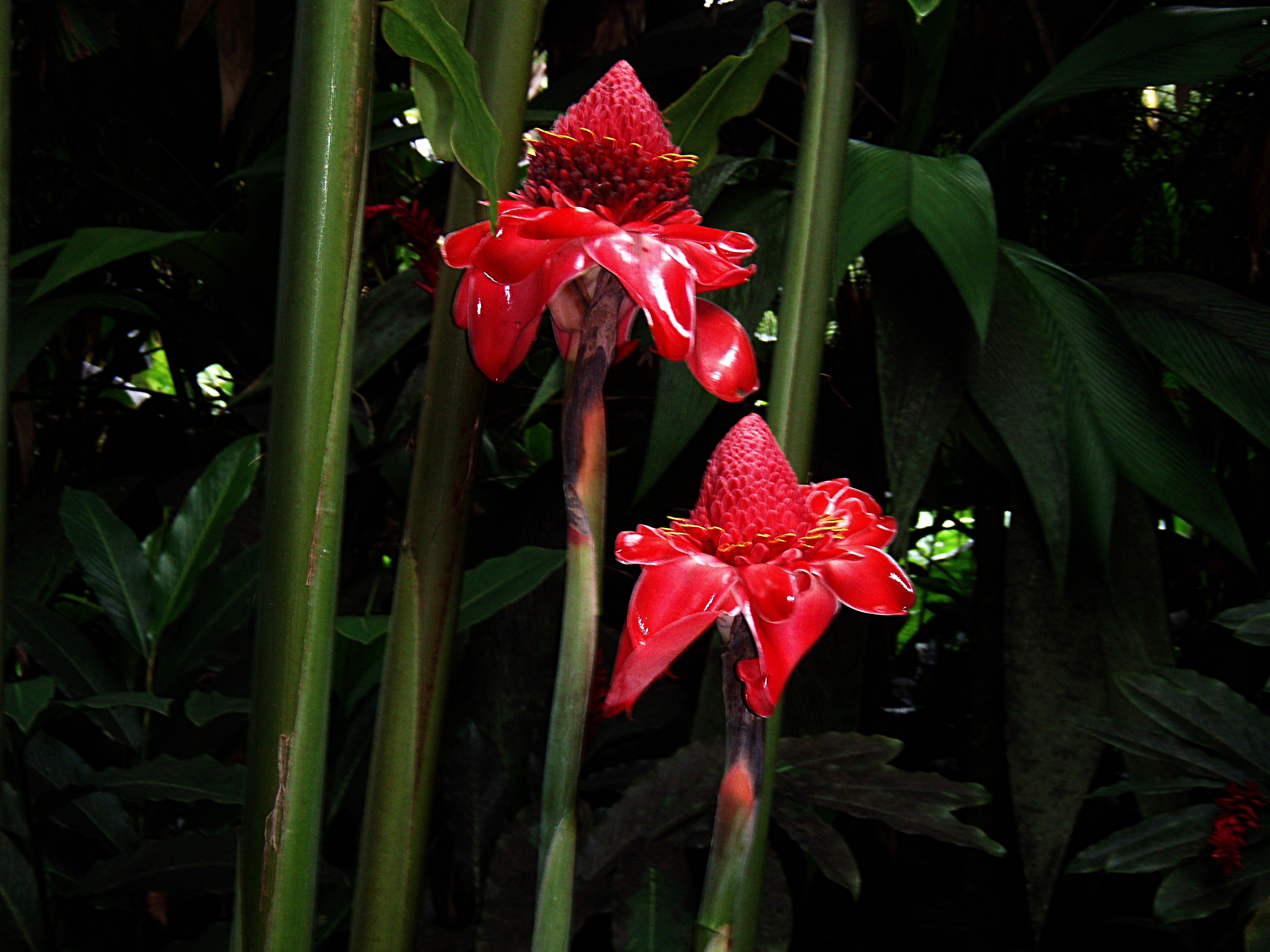
- Red torch ginger (Etlingera elatior)

Scientific classification
- Kingdom: Plantae
- Clade: Tracheophytes
- Clade: Angiosperms
- Clade: Monocots
- Clade: Commelinids
- Order: Zingiberales
- Family: Zingiberaceae; Martinov

Type genus
- Zingiber Boehm.

Genera
- 59 – see text

= Zingiberaceae =

Ginger family Temporal range: Campanian - recent

Family of plants

Zingiberaceae, the ginger family, is a family of flowering plants containing 59 genera and about 1600 described species distributed globally in the tropics and subtropics. They are aromatic perennial herbs with creeping rhizomes, sometimes tuberous. Basal leaf sheathing forms a pseudostem taller than their true stems which emerge unbranched. Flowers are typically zygomorphic (bilaterally symmetrical) and inflorescence is raceme. Fruit is typically a dry capsule and seeds are arillate.

Ancient fossils and phylogenetics indicate the Zingiberaceae evolved in Africa during the mid-Cretaceous period. The dispersal of these plants across Asia, the Americas, and Australia followed the expansion of tropical rain forest habitat soon after this period. In tropical Southeast Asia, conservation efforts are following the high diversity of endemic and threatened Zingiberaceae species due to deforestation and forest degradation.Habitat conservation is important for local cultures and economies in Thailand and its surrounding region, where Zingiberaceae species are grown for food, medicine, and socio-religious activities.

== Morphology ==
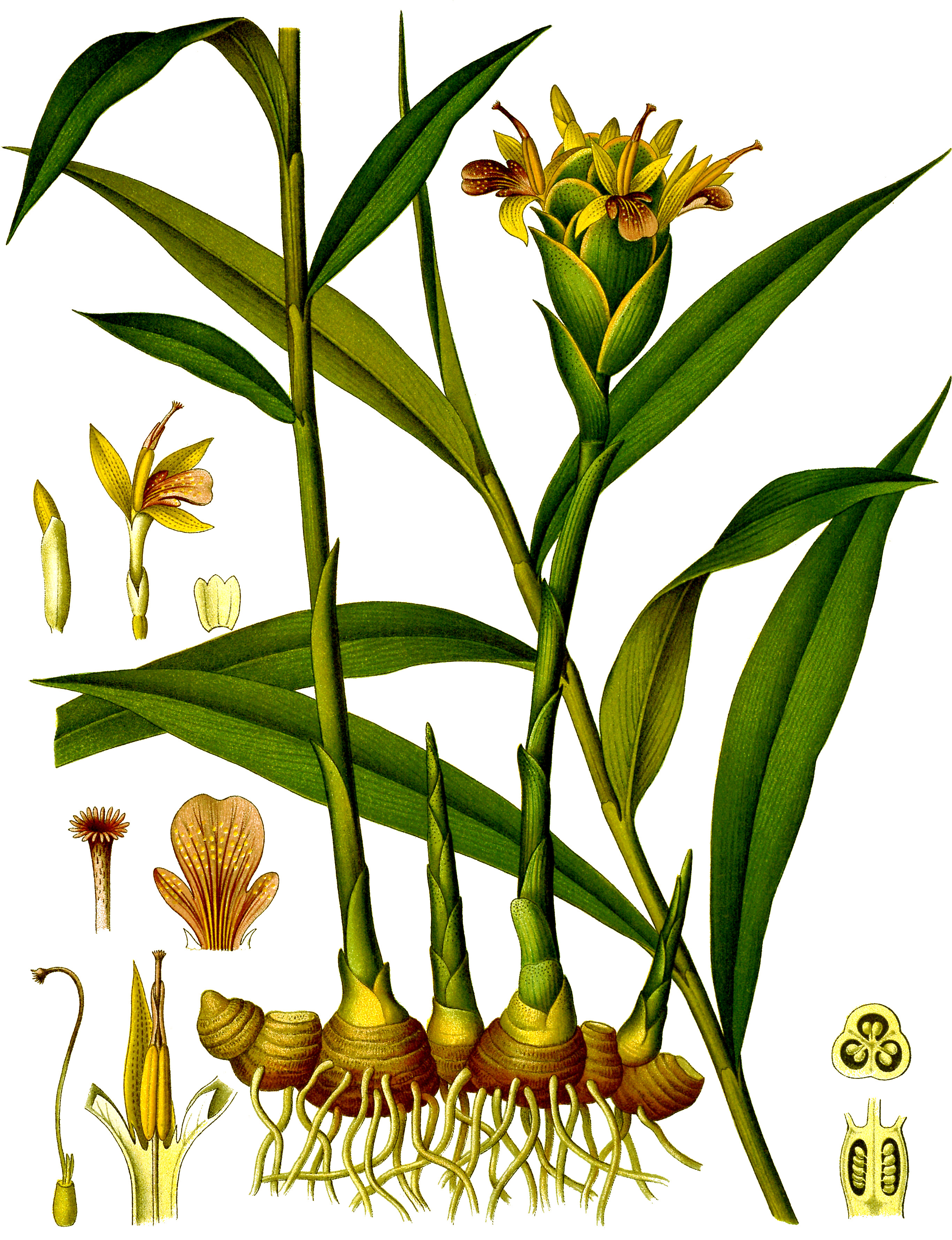
Illustration Zingiber officinale from Köhler's Medicinal Plants Zingiber officinale rhizome

=== Leaves and stems ===
Members of the family are small to large herbaceous plants with distichous leaves connected to basal sheaths that overlap to form a pseudostem, or 'false stem'. True erect vegetative stems are short, thin-walled and always unbranched. Horizontal underground stems are rhizomes, see description and photo below. Leaves are alternate, 2-ranked, entire, elliptic, with prominent midribs.

=== Flowers ===
Flowers are hermaphroditic, usually strongly zygomorphic, in raceme inflorescences, and subtended by conspicuous, spirally arranged bracts. The perianth is composed of two whorls, a fused tubular calyx, and a tubular corolla with one lobe larger than the other two. Flowers typically have two of their stamenoids (sterile stamens) fused to form a petaloid lip. There is one fertile stamen located in the inner whorl, median posterior. The ovary is inferior and topped by two nectaries, the stigma is funnel-shaped and appears on top of the anthers. There are three carpels always within the 3-locule ovary during early development.

=== Fruit and seeds ===
Fruit is a capsule, usually dry, and sometimes a fleshy berry. Seeds can be few-many, typically with an aril, often lobed or lacerated.

=== Rhizomes and roots ===
Most genera have large, fleshy rhizomes which provide nutrient storage as a sympodial horizontal stem. Rhizomes vary in their branching across genera; genera with smaller rhizomes often display large starch-filled tuberous roots. Unbranched stilt roots can be found in tropical taxa supporting the rhizome growth above ground.

== Pollination ==
Plants within the ginger family can propagate naturally asexually via their rhizomes, or they can reproduce sexually through pollination. Birds and bees are the major pollinators described pollinating Zingiberaceae in Asia, with a larger portion of bee pollinator-interactions observed. Roughly 30% of Zingiberaceae pollinators found during a 2023 review were blue-banded bees and halictid bees.

== Distribution ==
Zingiberaceae family members have pantropical distribution primarily in the tropics of south and Southeast Asia, however their entire distribution spans across Asia, Australia, Africa and the Americas. Most species can be found in forests and around 20 species are cultivated for domestic use.

The current distribution of the subfamilies Alpinioideae, Zingiberoideae, Siphonochiloideae and Tamijioideae reflects their varying lineage ages. Alpinioideae, Zingiberoideae, and Tamijioideae are all found in the tropical or equatorial regions of Asia, whereas Siphonochiloideae only grows in the African tropics. The shift in distribution from Africa to Asia likely took place in the late-Cretaceous period as global climate shifts of warming temperatures facilitated the expansion of tropical rain forests.

Different genera show variance in their distribution across forested habitats and cultivated areas. A report in Thailand showed the genera Globba, Curcuma, and Kaempferia represented high diversity in both habitat types, whereas genera such as Cornukaempferia and Hedychium were absent in the forest.

The plants are either self-supporting or epiphytic.

== Evolution and ecology ==
The Zingiberaceae family has evolved four subfamilies since the origin of their common ancestor during the mid-Cretaceous period. The earliest known fossils of the family belong to the Campanian age (late-Cretaceous) and are from the genera Spirematospermum in Germany,Tricostatocarpon and Striatornata in Mexico, and Momordiocarpon in India. Spirematospermum chandlerae from the Santonian of North Carolina was previously classified in the Zingiberaceae, but more recent studies support it belonging to the Musaceae.

Zingiberaceae have highly diverse seed morphology compared to their sister families within Zingiberaleas. This is likely an adaptive result to their inhabitation in both temperate and tropical climates. According to a study on comparative seed morphology, the genetic plasticity in seed morphospace could attribute to the high species diversity in Zingiberaceae.

== Conservation ==
Tropical southeast Asia is an area of crucial importance for conservation efforts. Zingibereaceae species are threatened by deforestation and forest degradation in this region of high species diversity and endemism. A conservation report on the zingiberaceae recorded nearly 300 threatened species out of roughly 14,450 species assessed. Most of the threatened species put at risk by anthropogenic factors and few species that are threatened by natural disasters volcanic eruptions and tsunamis. The future of on-site conservation involves population monitoring and management to ensure the continued reproduction and adaptation of Zingiberaceae species. For the species close to extinction, ex situ conservation approaches such as propagating and sustaining species outside their natural ecosystem is a better approach. Botanical gardens and genebanks serve to increase the chance of survival by avoiding natural threats before restoring populations back in the wild.

== Human uses and history ==
Supporting humans through food, spices, medicine, ornamentation, cosmetics, and various socio-religious activities, the Zingiberaceae family has been used across ancient traditional and modern societies. The rhizome is characteristically known for its use as a spice and for its medicinal antioxidant properties. Spices include ginger (Zingiber officinale), Thai ginger (Alpinia galanga and others), melegueta pepper (Aframomum melegueta), myoga (Zingiber mioga), korarima (Aframomum corrorima), turmeric (Curcuma longa L.), Javanese ginger (Curcuma zanthorrhiza) and cardamom (Amomum and Elettaria species). Many of these spices contain either of the bioactive compounds ginger or curcuminoid, both of which are used for therapeutic affects as anti-inflammatory and antimicrobial agents. Several commercially and culturally important aromatic medicinal plants in this family are native to India, including Alpinia calcarata and a wide diversity of 40 Curcuma species. In regions, such as Saraburi Province, Thailand, where many species of the Zingiberaceae are home to, these plants have cultivated rich cultural traditions and economic growth, propelling a need for their habitat conservation.

Ornamental genera include the shell gingers (Alpinia), Curcuma, Hedychium, Kaempferia, and torch-gingers (Etlingera). Some genera yield essential oils used in the perfume industry (Alpinia, Hedychium).

== Genera ==
As of August 2026, Plants of the World Online accepts the following 59 genera:

- Adelmeria Ridl.
- Aframomum K.Schum.
- Alpinia Roxb.
- Amomum Roxb.
- Aulotandra Gagnep.
- Boesenbergia Kuntze
- Burbidgea Hook.f.
- Camptandra Ridl.
- Caulokaempferia K.Larsen
- Cautleya (Royle ex Benth.) Hook.f.
- Conamomum Ridl.
- Cornukaempferia Mood & K.Larsen
- Curcuma L.
- Cyphostigma Benth.
- Distichochlamys M.F.Newman
- Elettaria Maton
- Epiamomum A.D.Poulsen & Škorničk.
- Etlingera Giseke
- Gagnepainia K.Schum.
- Geocharis (K.Schum.) Ridl.
- Geostachys (Baker) Ridl.
- Globba L.
- Haniffia Holttum
- Hedychium J.Koenig
- Hellwigia Warb.
- Hemiorchis Kurz
- Hornstedtia Retz.
- Johoralia C.K.Lim
- Kaempferia L.
- Kedhalia C.K.Lim
- Lanxangia M.F.Newman & Škorničk.
- Larsenianthus W.J.Kress & Mood
- Leptosolena C.Presl
- Meistera Giseke
- Myxochlamys A.Takano & Nagam.
- Nanochilus K.Schum.
- Newmania N.S.Lý & Škorničk.
- Parakaempferia A.S.Rao & D.M.Verma
- Perakalia C.K.Lim
- Plagiostachys Ridl.
- Pleuranthodium (K.Schum.) R.M.Sm.
- Pommereschea Wittm.
- Pyrgophyllum (Gagnep.) T.L.Wu & Z.Y.Chen
- Renealmia L.f.
- Rhynchanthus Hook.f.
- Riedelia Oliv.
- Roscoea Sm.
- Scaphochlamys Baker
- Siamanthus K.Larsen & J.Mood
- Siliquamomum Baill.
- Siphonochilus J.M.Wood & Franks
- Srilankanthus Maras. & A.D.Poulsen
- Stadiochilus R.M.Sm.
- Sulettaria A.D.Poulsen & Mathisen
- Sundamomum A.D.Poulsen & M.F.Newman
- Tamijia S.Sakai & Nagam.
- Vanoverberghia Merr.
- Wurfbainia Giseke
- Zingiber Mill.

== Taxonomy ==
Cladogram: Phylogeny of Zingiberales

- Zingiberales
  - - - Zingiberineae
        - Zingiberariae
          - Zingiberaceae
          - Costaceae
        - Cannariae
          - Cannaceae
          - Marantaceae
      - - Strelitziineae
          - Lowiaceae
          - Strelitziaceae
        - Heliconiaceae
  - - Musaceae

Phylogenetic tree of the family

=== Subdivisions ===
- Zingiberaceae
  - - - Zingiberoideae
      - Alpinioideae
    - Siphonochiloideae
  - Tamijioideae

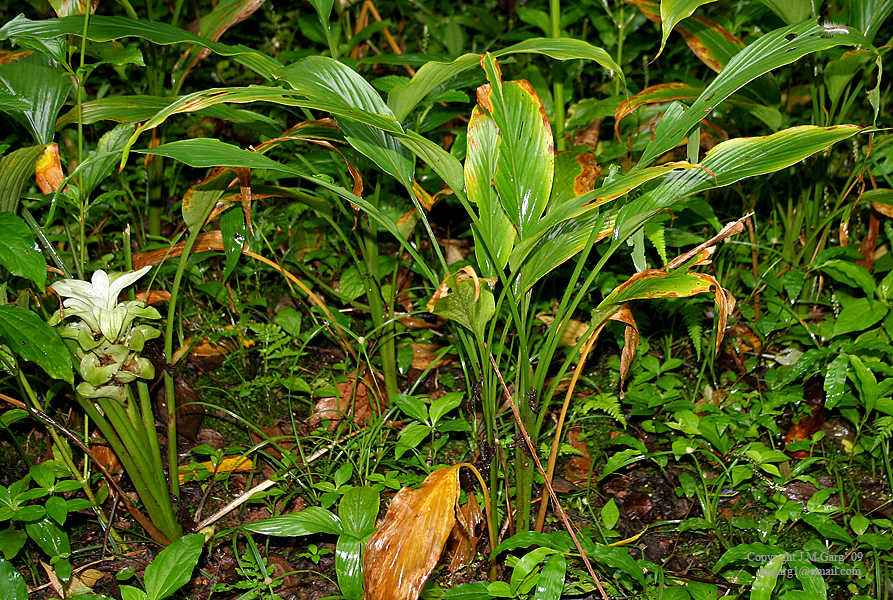
Curcuma longa

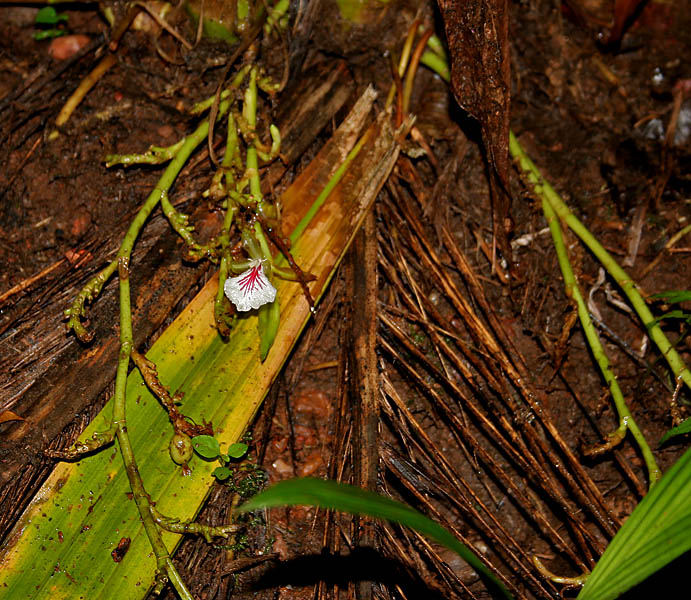
Elettaria cardamomum

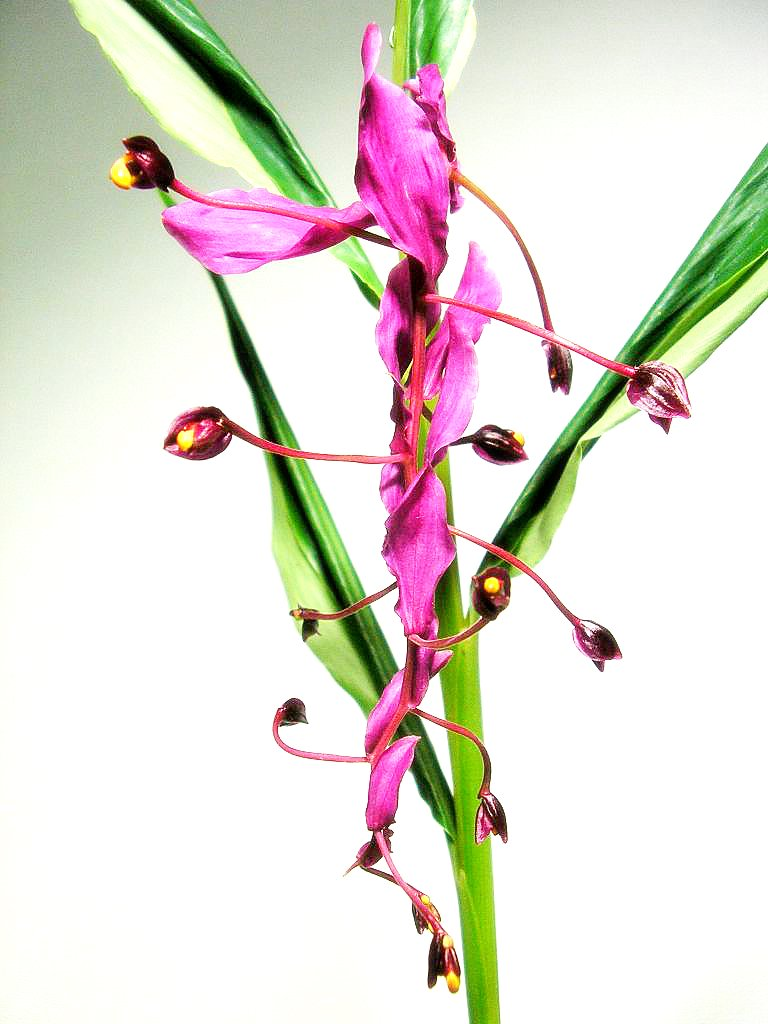
Globba inflorescence.

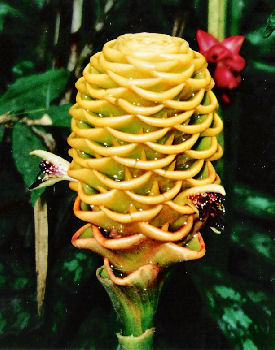
Zingiber spectabile cultivar Beehive

- Subfamily Siphonochiloideae
  - Tribe Siphonochileae
    - Siphonochilus
- Subfamily Tamijioideae
  - Tribe Tamijieae
    - Tamijia
- Subfamily Alpinioideae
  - Tribe Alpinieae
    - Adelmeria
    - Aframomum - grains of paradise
    - Alpinia
    - Amomum
    - Aulotandra
    - Cyphostigma
    - Elettaria
    - Elettariopsis
    - Etlingera
    - Geocharis
    - Geostachys
    - Hornstedtia
    - Lanxangia
    - Leptosolena
    - Plagiostachys
    - Renealmia
    - Siliquamomum
    - Vanoverberghia
    - ×Alpingera F. Luc-Cayol (Alpinia × Etlingera) - intergeneric hybrid
  - Tribe Riedelieae
    - Burbidgea
    - Pleuranthodium
    - Riedelia
    - Siamanthus
- Subfamily Zingiberoideae
  - Tribe Zingibereae
    - Boesenbergia
    - Camptandra
    - Caulokaempferia
    - Cautleya
    - Cornukaempferia
    - Curcuma
    - Curcumorpha
    - Distichochlamys
    - Haniffia
    - Haplochorema
    - Hedychium
    - Hitchenia
    - Kaempferia
    - Kedhalia
    - Laosanthus
    - Myxochlamys
    - Nanochilus
    - Newmania
    - Parakaempferia
    - Pommereschea
    - Pyrgophyllum
    - Rhynchanthus
    - Roscoea
    - Scaphochlamys
    - Smithatris
    - Stadiochilus
    - Stahlianthus
    - Zingiber
  - Tribe Globbeae
    - Gagnepainia
    - Globba
    - Hemiorchis
- subfamily unknown
  - Johoralia
  - Perakalia

== Bibliography ==
- Sass, Chodon; Iles, William J.D.; Barrett, Craig F.; Smith, Selena Y.; Specht, Chelsea D. (21 January 2016). "Revisiting the Zingiberales: using multiplexed exon capture to resolve ancient and recent phylogenetic splits in a charismatic plant lineage". PeerJ. 4 e1584. Bibcode:2016PeerJ...4e1584S. doi:10.7717/peerj.1584. PMC 4727956. PMID 26819846.
