= Etlingera grandiflora =

Scientific classification
- Kingdom: Plantae
- Clade: Tracheophytes
- Clade: Angiosperms
- Clade: Monocots
- Clade: Commelinids
- Order: Zingiberales
- Family: Zingiberaceae
- Genus: Etlingera
- Species: E. grandiflora

Binomial name
- Etlingera grandiflora (Valeton) R.M.Sm.

Species of flowering plant

Etlingera grandiflora is a monocotyledonous plant species that was first described by Theodoric Valeton, and got its current name by Rosemary Margaret Smith. Etlingera grandiflora is part of the genus Etlingera and the family Zingiberaceae. The species' range is Papua New Guinea. No subspecies are listed in the Catalog of Life.
