= Etlingera goliathensis =

Scientific classification
- Kingdom: Plantae
- Clade: Tracheophytes
- Clade: Angiosperms
- Clade: Monocots
- Clade: Commelinids
- Order: Zingiberales
- Family: Zingiberaceae
- Genus: Etlingera
- Species: E. goliathensis

Binomial name
- Etlingera goliathensis (Valeton) R.M.Sm.

Species of plant

Etlingera goliathensis is a monocotyledonous plant species first described by Theodoric Valeton, and given its current name by Rosemary Margaret Smith. Etlingera goliathensis is part of the genus Etlingera and the family Zingiberaceae. No subspecies are listed in the Catalog of Life.
