= Etlingera longipetala =

Scientific classification
- Kingdom: Plantae
- Clade: Tracheophytes
- Clade: Angiosperms
- Clade: Monocots
- Clade: Commelinids
- Order: Zingiberales
- Family: Zingiberaceae
- Genus: Etlingera
- Species: E. longipetala

Binomial name
- Etlingera longipetala (Valeton) R.M.Sm.

Species of plant

Etlingera longipetala is a monocotyledonous plant species first described by Theodoric Valeton, and given its current name by Rosemary Margaret Smith. Etlingera longipetala is part of the genus Etlingera and the family Zingiberaceae. No subspecies are listed in the Catalog of Life.
