= Etlingera amomoides =

Scientific classification
- Kingdom: Plantae
- Clade: Tracheophytes
- Clade: Angiosperms
- Clade: Monocots
- Clade: Commelinids
- Order: Zingiberales
- Family: Zingiberaceae
- Genus: Etlingera
- Species: E. amomoides

Binomial name
- Etlingera amomoides A.D.Poulsen & Mood

Species of plant

Etlingera amomoides is a monocotyledonous plant species described by Axel Dalberg Poulsen and John Donald Mood. Etlingera amomoides is part of the genus Etlingera and the family Zingiberaceae. No subspecies are listed in the Catalog of Life.
