= Etlingera subulicalyx =

Scientific classification
- Kingdom: Plantae
- Clade: Tracheophytes
- Clade: Angiosperms
- Clade: Monocots
- Clade: Commelinids
- Order: Zingiberales
- Family: Zingiberaceae
- Genus: Etlingera
- Species: E. subulicalyx

Binomial name
- Etlingera subulicalyx (Valeton) R.M.Sm.

Species of plant

Etlingera subulicalyx is a monocotyledonous plant species first described by Theodoric Valeton, and given its current name by Rosemary Margaret Smith. Etlingera subulicalyx is part of the genus Etlingera and the family Zingiberaceae.

The species' range is Sumatra. No subspecies are listed in the Catalog of Life.
