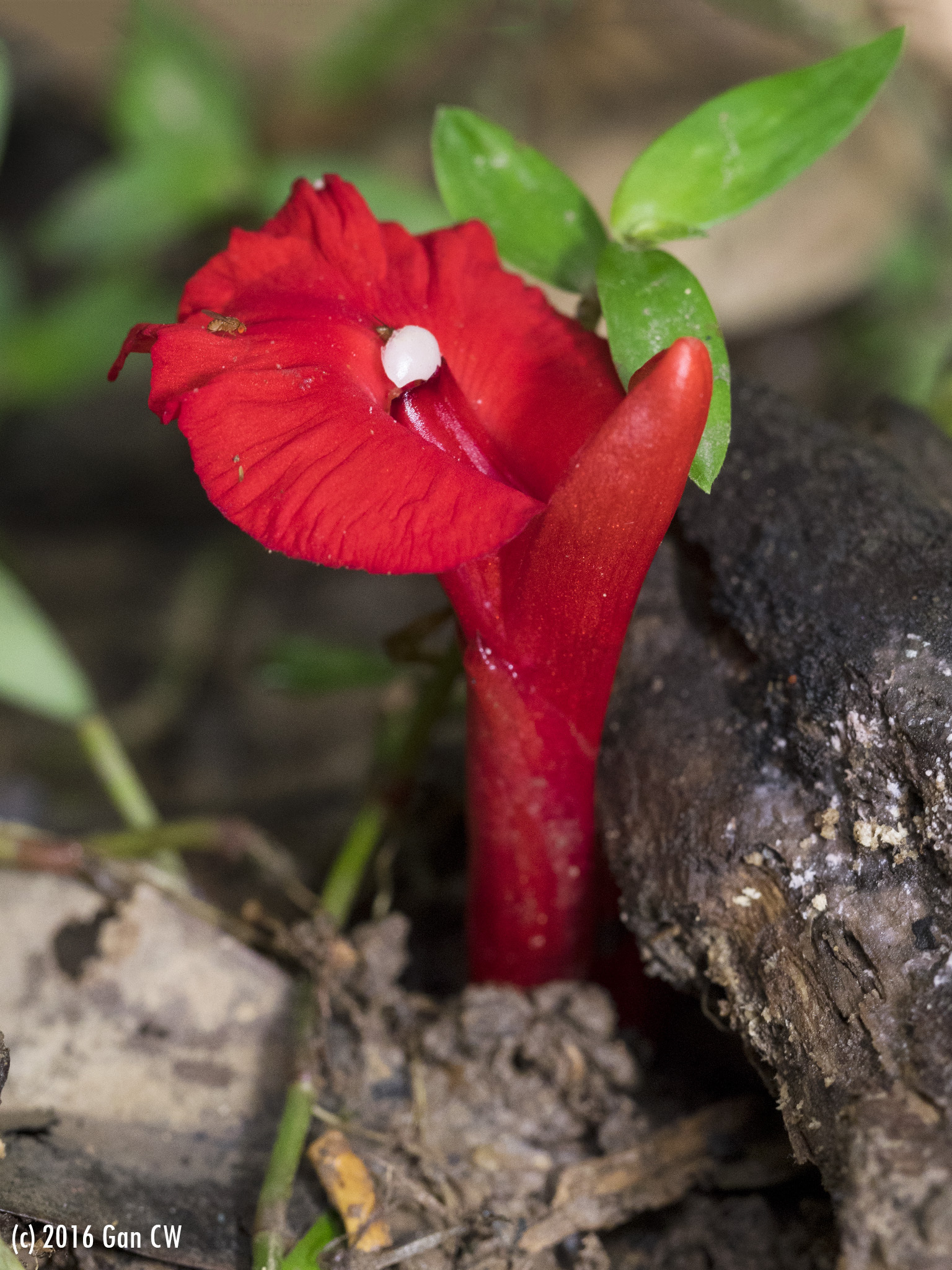

Scientific classification
- Kingdom: Plantae
- Clade: Tracheophytes
- Clade: Angiosperms
- Clade: Monocots
- Clade: Commelinids
- Order: Zingiberales
- Family: Zingiberaceae
- Genus: Etlingera
- Species: E. brevilabrum

Binomial name
- Etlingera brevilabrum (Valeton) R.M.Sm.

= Etlingera brevilabrum =

Species of plant

Etlingera brevilabrum is a monocotyledonous plant species that was first described by Theodoric Valeton, and given its current name by Rosemary Margaret Smith. Etlingera brevilabrum is part of the genus Etlingera and the family Zingiberaceae. No subspecies are listed in the Catalog of Life.
