= Etlingera angustifolia =

Scientific classification
- Kingdom: Plantae
- Clade: Tracheophytes
- Clade: Angiosperms
- Clade: Monocots
- Clade: Commelinids
- Order: Zingiberales
- Family: Zingiberaceae
- Genus: Etlingera
- Species: E. angustifolia

Binomial name
- Etlingera angustifolia (Valeton) R.M.Sm.

Species of plant

Etlingera angustifolia is a monocotyledonous plant species first described by Theodoric Valeton, and given its current name by Rosemary Margaret Smith. Etlingera angustifolia is part of the genus Etlingera and the family Zingiberaceae. No subspecies are listed in the Catalog of Life.
