= Etlingera rubromarginata =

Scientific classification
- Kingdom: Plantae
- Clade: Tracheophytes
- Clade: Angiosperms
- Clade: Monocots
- Clade: Commelinids
- Order: Zingiberales
- Family: Zingiberaceae
- Genus: Etlingera
- Species: E. rubromarginata

Binomial name
- Etlingera rubromarginata A.D.Poulsen & Mood

Species of plant

Etlingera rubromarginata is a monocotyledonous plant species described by Axel Dalberg Poulsen and John Donald Mood. Etlingera rubromarginata is part of the genus Etlingera and the family Zingiberaceae. No subspecies are listed in the Catalog of Life.
