= Etlingera bromeliopsis =

Scientific classification
- Kingdom: Plantae
- Clade: Tracheophytes
- Clade: Angiosperms
- Clade: Monocots
- Clade: Commelinids
- Order: Zingiberales
- Family: Zingiberaceae
- Genus: Etlingera
- Species: E. bromeliopsis

Binomial name
- Etlingera bromeliopsis (Valeton) R.M.Sm.

Species of plant

Etlingera bromeliopsis is a monocotyledonous plant species first described by Theodoric Valeton, and given its current name by Rosemary Margaret Smith. Etlingera bromeliopsis is part of the genus Etlingera and the family Zingiberaceae. No subspecies are listed in the Catalog of Life.
