= Etlingera polyantha =

Scientific classification
- Kingdom: Plantae
- Clade: Tracheophytes
- Clade: Angiosperms
- Clade: Monocots
- Clade: Commelinids
- Order: Zingiberales
- Family: Zingiberaceae
- Genus: Etlingera
- Species: E. polyantha

Binomial name
- Etlingera polyantha (Valeton) R.M.Sm.

Species of plant

Etlingera polyantha is a monocotyledonous plant species that was first described by Theodoric Valeton, and given its current name by Rosemary Margaret Smith. Etlingera polyantha is part of the genus Etlingera and the family Zingiberaceae. No subspecies are listed in the Catalog of Life.
