= Etlingera heyneana =

Conservation status
- Extinct (IUCN 3.1)

Scientific classification
- Kingdom: Plantae
- Clade: Tracheophytes
- Clade: Angiosperms
- Clade: Monocots
- Clade: Commelinids
- Order: Zingiberales
- Family: Zingiberaceae
- Genus: Etlingera
- Species: †E. heyneana

Binomial name
- †Etlingera heyneana (Valeton) R.M.Sm., 1986

Synonyms
- Amomum heyneanum (Valeton) Bakh.f. (1958); Nicolaia heyneana Valeton (1921); Phaeomeria heyneana (Valeton) Burkill (1935)

Extinct plant species in the ginger family

Etlingera heyniana is a monocotyledonous plant species first described by Theodoric Valeton and given its current name by Rosemary Margaret Smith. Etlingera heyniana is part of the genus Etlingera and the family Zingiberaceae.

The range of the species is Java. No subspecies are listed in the Catalog of Life. It was last observed in 1921 and assessed as extinct by the IUCN in 2019.
