= Etlingera gracilis =

Conservation status
- Critically endangered, possibly extinct (IUCN 3.1)

Scientific classification
- Kingdom: Plantae
- Clade: Tracheophytes
- Clade: Angiosperms
- Clade: Monocots
- Clade: Commelinids
- Order: Zingiberales
- Family: Zingiberaceae
- Genus: Etlingera
- Species: E. gracilis

Binomial name
- Etlingera gracilis (Valeton) R.M.Sm.

Species of plant

Etlingera gracilis is a monocotyledonous plant species first described by Theodoric Valeton, and given its current name by Rosemary Margaret Smith. Etlingera gracilis is part of the genus Etlingera and the family Zingiberaceae.

The species' range is in Sumatra. No subspecies are listed in the Catalog of Life.
