= Etlingera latifolia =

Scientific classification
- Kingdom: Plantae
- Clade: Tracheophytes
- Clade: Angiosperms
- Clade: Monocots
- Clade: Commelinids
- Order: Zingiberales
- Family: Zingiberaceae
- Genus: Etlingera
- Species: E. latifolia

Binomial name
- Etlingera latifolia (Valeton) R.M.Sm.

Species of plant

Etlingera latifolia is a monocotyledonous plant species first described by Theodoric Valeton, and given its current name by Rosemary Margaret Smith. Etlingera latifolia is part of the genus Etlingera and the family Zingiberaceae. No subspecies are listed in the Catalog of Life.
