= Etlingera loerzingii =

Scientific classification
- Kingdom: Plantae
- Clade: Tracheophytes
- Clade: Angiosperms
- Clade: Monocots
- Clade: Commelinids
- Order: Zingiberales
- Family: Zingiberaceae
- Genus: Etlingera
- Species: E. loerzingii

Binomial name
- Etlingera loerzingii (Valeton) R.M.Sm.

Species of plant

Etlingera loerzingii is a monocotyledonous plant species first described by Theodoric Valeton, and given its current name by Rosemary Margaret Smith. Etlingera loerzingii is part of the genus Etlingera and the family Zingiberaceae.

The species' range is Sumatra. No subspecies are listed in the Catalog of Life.
