= Etlingera peekelii =

Scientific classification
- Kingdom: Plantae
- Clade: Tracheophytes
- Clade: Angiosperms
- Clade: Monocots
- Clade: Commelinids
- Order: Zingiberales
- Family: Zingiberaceae
- Genus: Etlingera
- Species: E. peekelii

Binomial name
- Etlingera peekelii (Valeton) R.M.Sm.

Species of plant

Etlingera peekelii is a monocotyledonous plant species first described by Theodoric Valeton, and given its current name by Rosemary Margaret Smith. Etlingera peekelii is part of the genus Etlingera and the family Zingiberaceae. No subspecies are listed in the Catalog of Life.
