= Etlingera calycina =

Scientific classification
- Kingdom: Plantae
- Clade: Tracheophytes
- Clade: Angiosperms
- Clade: Monocots
- Clade: Commelinids
- Order: Zingiberales
- Family: Zingiberaceae
- Genus: Etlingera
- Species: E. calycina

Binomial name
- Etlingera calycina (Valeton) R.M.Sm.

Species of plant

Etlingera calycina is a monocotyledonous plant species first described by Theodoric Valeton, and given its current name by Rosemary Margaret Smith. Etlingera calycina is part of the genus Etlingera and the family Zingiberaceae. No subspecies are listed in the Catalog of Life.
