= Etlingera dekockii =

Scientific classification
- Kingdom: Plantae
- Clade: Tracheophytes
- Clade: Angiosperms
- Clade: Monocots
- Clade: Commelinids
- Order: Zingiberales
- Family: Zingiberaceae
- Genus: Etlingera
- Species: E. dekockii

Binomial name
- Etlingera dekockii (Valeton) R.M.Sm.

Species of plant

Etlingera dekockii is a monocotyledonous plant species first described by Theodoric Valeton, and given its current name by Rosemary Margaret Smith. Etlingera dekockii is part of the genus Etlingera' and the family Zingiberaceae. No subspecies are listed in the Catalog of Life.
