= Etlingera versteegii =

Scientific classification
- Kingdom: Plantae
- Clade: Tracheophytes
- Clade: Angiosperms
- Clade: Monocots
- Clade: Commelinids
- Order: Zingiberales
- Family: Zingiberaceae
- Genus: Etlingera
- Species: E. versteegii

Binomial name
- Etlingera versteegii (Valeton) R.M.Sm.

Species of plant

Etlingera versteegii is a monocotyledonous plant species that was first described by Theodoric Valeton, and given its current name from Rosemary Margaret Smith. Etlingera versteegii is part of the genus Etlingera and the family Zingiberaceae. No subspecies are listed in the Catalog of Life.
