= Etlingera corrugata =

Scientific classification
- Kingdom: Plantae
- Clade: Tracheophytes
- Clade: Angiosperms
- Clade: Monocots
- Clade: Commelinids
- Order: Zingiberales
- Family: Zingiberaceae
- Genus: Etlingera
- Species: E. corrugata

Binomial name
- Etlingera corrugata A.D.Poulsen & Mood

Species of flowering plant

Etlingera corrugata is a monocotyledonous plant species described by Axel Dalberg Poulsen and John Donald Mood. Etlingera corrugata is part of the genus Etlingera and the family Zingiberaceae. No subspecies are listed in the Catalog of Life.
