= Etlingera albolutea =

Scientific classification
- Kingdom: Plantae
- Clade: Tracheophytes
- Clade: Angiosperms
- Clade: Monocots
- Clade: Commelinids
- Order: Zingiberales
- Family: Zingiberaceae
- Genus: Etlingera
- Species: E. albolutea

Binomial name
- Etlingera albolutea A.D.Poulsen & Mood

Species of flowering plant

Etlingera albolutea is a monocotyledonous plant species described by Axel Dalberg Poulsen and John Donald Mood. Etlingera albolutea is part of the genus Etlingera and the family Zingiberaceae. No subspecies are listed in the Catalog of Life.
