= Etlingera densiuscula =

Scientific classification
- Kingdom: Plantae
- Clade: Tracheophytes
- Clade: Angiosperms
- Clade: Monocots
- Clade: Commelinids
- Order: Zingiberales
- Family: Zingiberaceae
- Genus: Etlingera
- Species: E. densiuscula

Binomial name
- Etlingera densiuscula (Valeton) R.M.Sm.

Species of plant

Etlingera densiuscula is a monocotyledonous plant species first described by Theodoric Valeton, and given its current name by Rosemary Margaret Smith. Etlingera densiuscula is part of the genus Etlingera and the family Zingiberaceae.

The species' range is in Papua New Guinea. No subspecies are listed in the Catalog of Life.
