= Etlingera subterranea =

Scientific classification
- Kingdom: Plantae
- Clade: Tracheophytes
- Clade: Angiosperms
- Clade: Monocots
- Clade: Commelinids
- Order: Zingiberales
- Family: Zingiberaceae
- Genus: Etlingera
- Species: E. subterranea

Binomial name
- Etlingera subterranea (Holttum) R.M.Sm.

Species of flowering plant

Etlingera subterranea is a monocotyledonous plant species that was first described by Richard Eric Holttum, and given its current name by Rosemary Margaret Smith. Etlingera subterranea is part of the genus Etlingera and the family Zingiberaceae. No subspecies are listed in the Catalog of Life.
