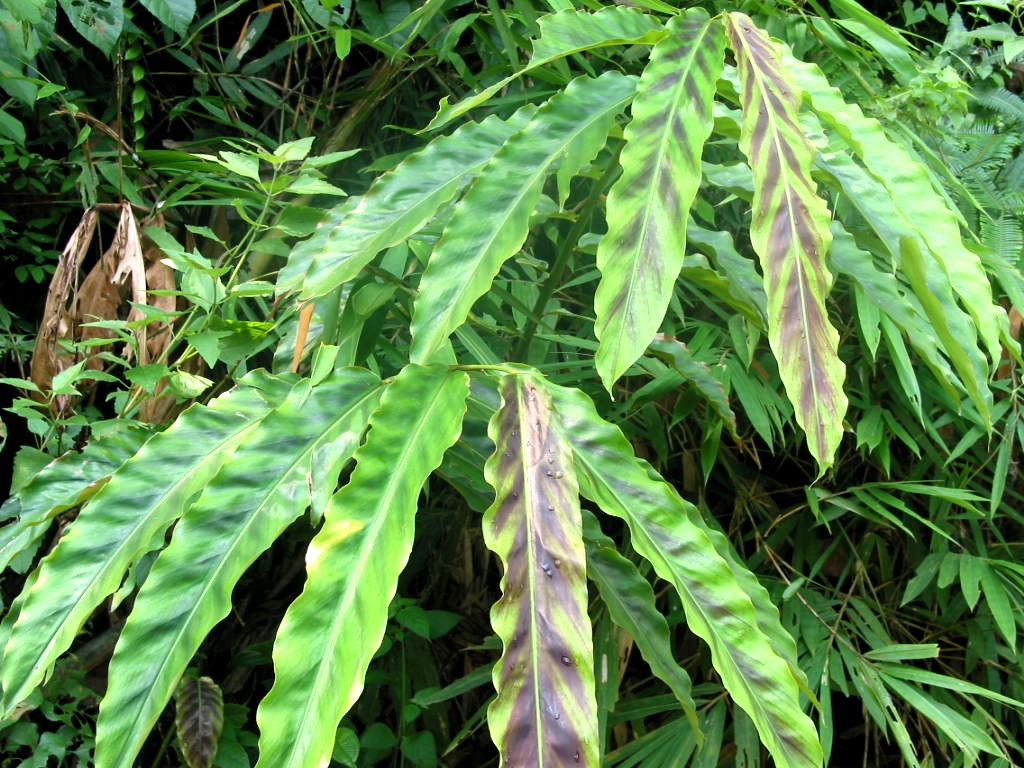

Scientific classification
- Kingdom: Plantae
- Clade: Tracheophytes
- Clade: Angiosperms
- Clade: Monocots
- Clade: Commelinids
- Order: Zingiberales
- Family: Zingiberaceae
- Genus: Etlingera
- Species: E. rubrostriata

Binomial name
- Etlingera rubrostriata (Holttum) C.K.Lim

= Etlingera rubrostriata =

Species of plant

Etlingera rubrostriata is a monocotyledonous plant species that was first described by Richard Eric Holttum, and got its current name from Lim Chong Keat. Etlingera rubrostriata is part of the genus Etlingera and the family Zingiberaceae. No subspecies are listed in the Catalog of Life.
