= Etlingera walang =

Scientific classification
- Kingdom: Plantae
- Clade: Tracheophytes
- Clade: Angiosperms
- Clade: Monocots
- Clade: Commelinids
- Order: Zingiberales
- Family: Zingiberaceae
- Genus: Etlingera
- Species: E. walang

Binomial name
- Etlingera walang (Blume) R.M.Sm.

Species of plant

Etlingera walang is a monocotyledonous plant species first described by Carl Ludwig von Blume, and given its current name by Rosemary Margaret Smith. Etlingera walang is part of the genus Etlingera and the family Zingiberaceae.

The range of the species is Java. No subspecies are listed in the Catalog of Life.
