= Etlingera labellosa =

Scientific classification
- Kingdom: Plantae
- Clade: Tracheophytes
- Clade: Angiosperms
- Clade: Monocots
- Clade: Commelinids
- Order: Zingiberales
- Family: Zingiberaceae
- Genus: Etlingera
- Species: E. labellosa

Binomial name
- Etlingera labellosa (K.Schum.) R.M.Sm.

Species of plant

Etlingera labellosa is a monocotyledonous plant species that was first described by Karl Moritz Schumann, and given its current name by Rosemary Margaret Smith. Etlingera labellosa is part of the genus Etlingera and the family Zingiberaceae.

== Range ==
The species is found in Papua New Guinea.
