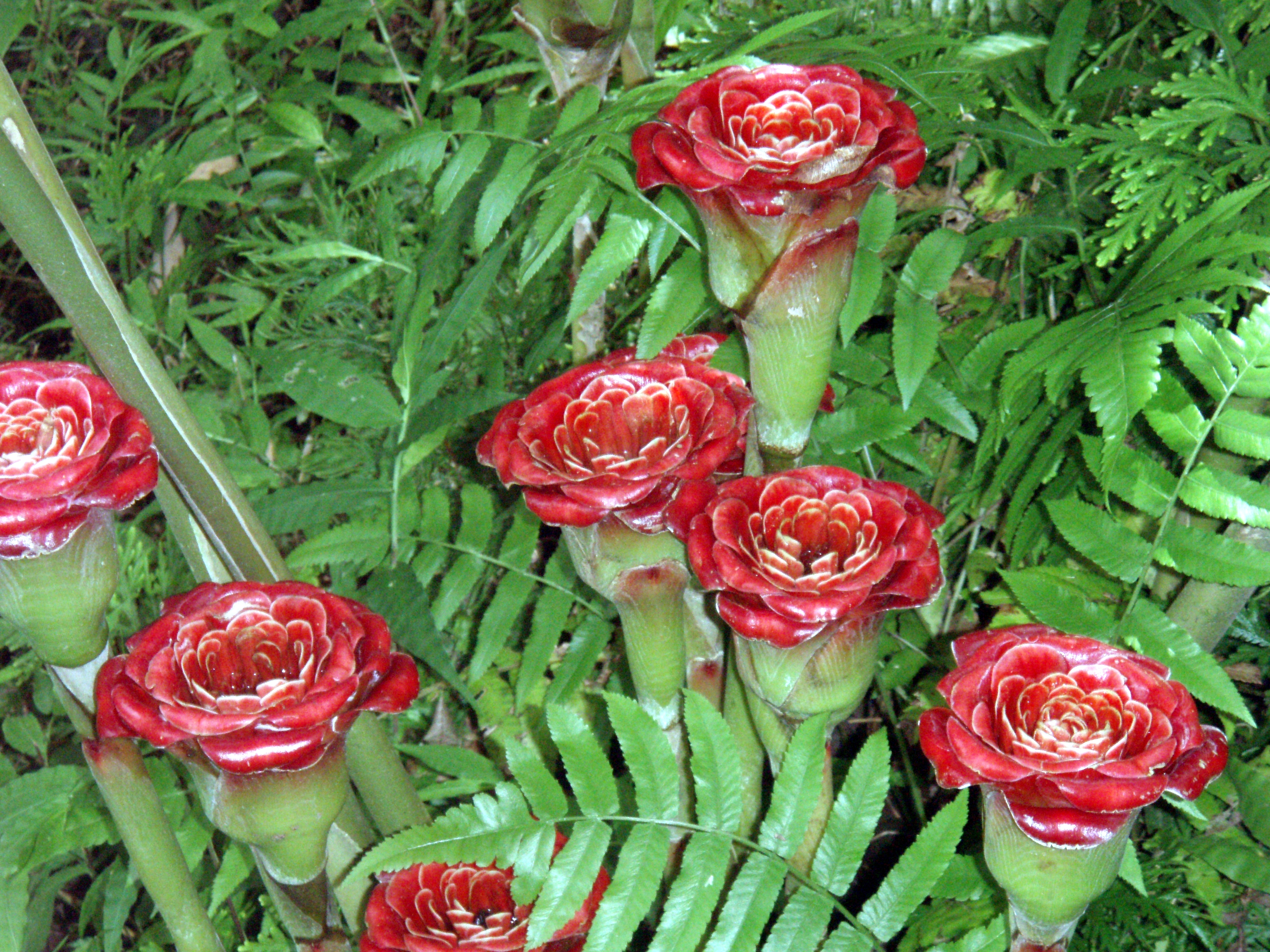

Scientific classification
- Kingdom: Plantae
- Clade: Tracheophytes
- Clade: Angiosperms
- Clade: Monocots
- Clade: Commelinids
- Order: Zingiberales
- Family: Zingiberaceae
- Genus: Etlingera
- Species: E. corneri

Binomial name
- Etlingera corneri Mood & Ibrahim

= Etlingera corneri =

Species of flowering plant

Etlingera corneri also known as ka lo or rose of Siam, is a monocotyledonous plant species described by John Donald Mood and Halijah Ibrahim. Etlingera corneri is part of the genus Etlingera and the family Zingiberaceae. No subspecies are listed in the Catalog of Life.

Etlingera corneri is native to Thailand and Malaysia.
