= Etlingera foetens =

Scientific classification
- Kingdom: Plantae
- Clade: Tracheophytes
- Clade: Angiosperms
- Clade: Monocots
- Clade: Commelinids
- Order: Zingiberales
- Family: Zingiberaceae
- Genus: Etlingera
- Species: E. foetens

Binomial name
- Etlingera foetens (Blume) R.M.Sm.

Species of plant

Etlingera foetens is a monocotyledonous plant species that was first described by Carl Ludwig von Blume, and got its current name from Rosemary Margaret Smith. Etlingera foetens is part of the genus Etlingera and the family Zingiberaceae. No subspecies are listed in the Catalog of Life.
