= Etlingera pavieana =

Conservation status
- Near Threatened (IUCN 3.1)

Scientific classification
- Kingdom: Plantae
- Clade: Tracheophytes
- Clade: Angiosperms
- Clade: Monocots
- Clade: Commelinids
- Order: Zingiberales
- Family: Zingiberaceae
- Genus: Etlingera
- Species: E. pavieana

Binomial name
- Etlingera pavieana (Pierre ex Gagnep.) R.M.Sm.

Synonyms
- Achasma pavieanum (Pierre ex Gagnep.) Loes.; Amomum pavieanum Pierre ex Gagnep.

Species of plant

Etlingera pavieana is a monocotyledonous plant species first described by Jean Baptiste Louis Pierre and François Gagnepain, and given its current name by Rosemary Margaret Smith. Etlingera pavieana is part of the genus Etlingera and the family Zingiberaceae. No subspecies are listed in the Catalog of Life.
