= Etlingera pandanicarpa =

Scientific classification
- Kingdom: Plantae
- Clade: Tracheophytes
- Clade: Angiosperms
- Clade: Monocots
- Clade: Commelinids
- Order: Zingiberales
- Family: Zingiberaceae
- Genus: Etlingera
- Species: E. pandanicarpa

Binomial name
- Etlingera pandanicarpa (Elmer) A.D.Poulsen

Species of plant

Etlingera pandanicarpa is a monocotyledonous plant species that was first described by Adolph Daniel Edward Elmer, and given its current name from Axel Dalberg Poulsen. Etlingera pandanicarpa is part of the genus Etlingera and the family Zingiberaceae.

The species' range is in the Philippines. No subspecies are listed in the Catalog of Life.
