= Etlingera pyramidosphaera =

Scientific classification
- Kingdom: Plantae
- Clade: Tracheophytes
- Clade: Angiosperms
- Clade: Monocots
- Clade: Commelinids
- Order: Zingiberales
- Family: Zingiberaceae
- Genus: Etlingera
- Species: E. pyramidosphaera

Binomial name
- Etlingera pyramidosphaera (K.Schum.) R.M.Sm.

Species of flowering plant

Etlingera pyramidosphaera is a monocotyledonous plant species that was first described by Karl Moritz Schumann, and got its current name by Rosemary Margaret Smith. Etlingera pyramidosphaera is part of the genus Etlingera and the family Zingiberaceae. No subspecies are listed in the Catalog of Life.
