= Etlingera harmandii =

Scientific classification
- Kingdom: Plantae
- Clade: Tracheophytes
- Clade: Angiosperms
- Clade: Monocots
- Clade: Commelinids
- Order: Zingiberales
- Family: Zingiberaceae
- Genus: Etlingera
- Species: E. harmandii

Binomial name
- Etlingera harmandii (Gagnep.) R.M.Sm.

Synonyms
- Achasma harmandii (Gagnep.) Loes.; Amomum harmandii Gagnep.

Species of plant

Etlingera harmandii is a monocotyledonous plant species that was first described by François Gagnepain, and got its current name by Rosemary Margaret Smith. Etlingera harmandii is part of the genus Etlingera and the family Zingiberaceae. No subspecies are listed in the Catalog of Life.
