= Etlingera caudiculata =

Scientific classification
- Kingdom: Plantae
- Clade: Tracheophytes
- Clade: Angiosperms
- Clade: Monocots
- Clade: Commelinids
- Order: Zingiberales
- Family: Zingiberaceae
- Genus: Etlingera
- Species: E. caudiculata

Binomial name
- Etlingera caudiculata (Ridl.) R.M.Sm.

Species of flowering plant

Etlingera caudiculata is a monocotyledonous plant species first described by Henry Nicholas Ridley, and given its current name by Rosemary Margaret Smith. Etlingera caudiculata is part of the genus Etlingera and the family Zingiberaceae.

The species range is on Sumatra. No subspecies are listed in the Catalog of Life.
