= Etlingera polycarpa =

Scientific classification
- Kingdom: Plantae
- Clade: Tracheophytes
- Clade: Angiosperms
- Clade: Monocots
- Clade: Commelinids
- Order: Zingiberales
- Family: Zingiberaceae
- Genus: Etlingera
- Species: E. polycarpa

Binomial name
- Etlingera polycarpa (K.Schum.) A.D.Poulsen

Species of plant

Etlingera polycarpa is a monocotyledonous plant species that was first described by Karl Moritz Schumann, and given its current name from Axel Dalberg Poulsen. Etlingera polycarpa is part of the genus Etlingera and the family Zingiberaceae. No subspecies are listed in the Catalog of Life.
