= Etlingera minor =

Scientific classification
- Kingdom: Plantae
- Clade: Tracheophytes
- Clade: Angiosperms
- Clade: Monocots
- Clade: Commelinids
- Order: Zingiberales
- Family: Zingiberaceae
- Genus: Etlingera
- Species: E. minor

Binomial name
- Etlingera minor (Ridl.) R.M.Sm.

Species of plant

Etlingera minor is a monocotyledonous plant species that was first described by Henry Nicholas Ridley, and got its current name by Rosemary Margaret Smith. Etlingera minor is part of the genus Etlingera and the family Zingiberaceae.

The species' range is in Sumatra. No subspecies are listed in the Catalog of Life.
