= Etlingera sulfurea =

Scientific classification
- Kingdom: Plantae
- Clade: Tracheophytes
- Clade: Angiosperms
- Clade: Monocots
- Clade: Commelinids
- Order: Zingiberales
- Family: Zingiberaceae
- Genus: Etlingera
- Species: E. sulfurea

Binomial name
- Etlingera sulfurea (R.Parker) R.M.Sm.

Species of flowering plant

Etlingera sulfurea is a monocotyledonous plant species that was first described by Richard Neville Parker, and got its current name from Rosemary Margaret Smith. Etlingera sulfurea is part of the genus Etlingera and the family Zingiberaceae.

The range of the species is in Burma. No subspecies are listed in the Catalog of Life.
