= Etlingera linguiformis =

Scientific classification
- Kingdom: Plantae
- Clade: Tracheophytes
- Clade: Angiosperms
- Clade: Monocots
- Clade: Commelinids
- Order: Zingiberales
- Family: Zingiberaceae
- Genus: Etlingera
- Species: E. linguiformis

Binomial name
- Etlingera linguiformis (Roxb.) R.M.Sm.

Species of flowering plant

Etlingera linguiformis is a monocotyledonous plant species first described by William Roxburgh, and given its current name by Rosemary Margaret Smith. Etlingera linguiformis is part of the genus Etlingera and the family Zingiberaceae. No subspecies are listed in the Catalog of Life.
