= Etlingera moluccana =

Scientific classification
- Kingdom: Plantae
- Clade: Tracheophytes
- Clade: Angiosperms
- Clade: Monocots
- Clade: Commelinids
- Order: Zingiberales
- Family: Zingiberaceae
- Genus: Etlingera
- Species: E. moluccana

Binomial name
- Etlingera moluccana (K.Schum.) R.M.Sm.

Species of plant

Etlingera moluccana is a monocotyledonous plant species that was first described by Karl Moritz Schumann, and got its current name by Rosemary Margaret Smith. Etlingera moluccana is part of the genus Etlingera and the family Zingiberaceae.

The species' range is the Moluccas. No subspecies are listed in the Catalog of Life.
