= Etlingera rosamariae =

Scientific classification
- Kingdom: Plantae
- Clade: Embryophytes
- Clade: Tracheophytes
- Clade: Spermatophytes
- Clade: Angiosperms
- Clade: Monocots
- Clade: Commelinids
- Order: Zingiberales
- Family: Zingiberaceae
- Genus: Etlingera
- Species: E. rosamariae

Binomial name
- Etlingera rosamariae A.D.Poulsen & Gobilik

Species of flowering plant

Etlingera rosamariae is a monocotyledonous plant species described by Axel Dalberg Poulsen and Gobilik. Etlingera rosamariae is part of the genus Etlingera and the family Zingiberaceae. No subspecies are listed in the Catalog of Life.
