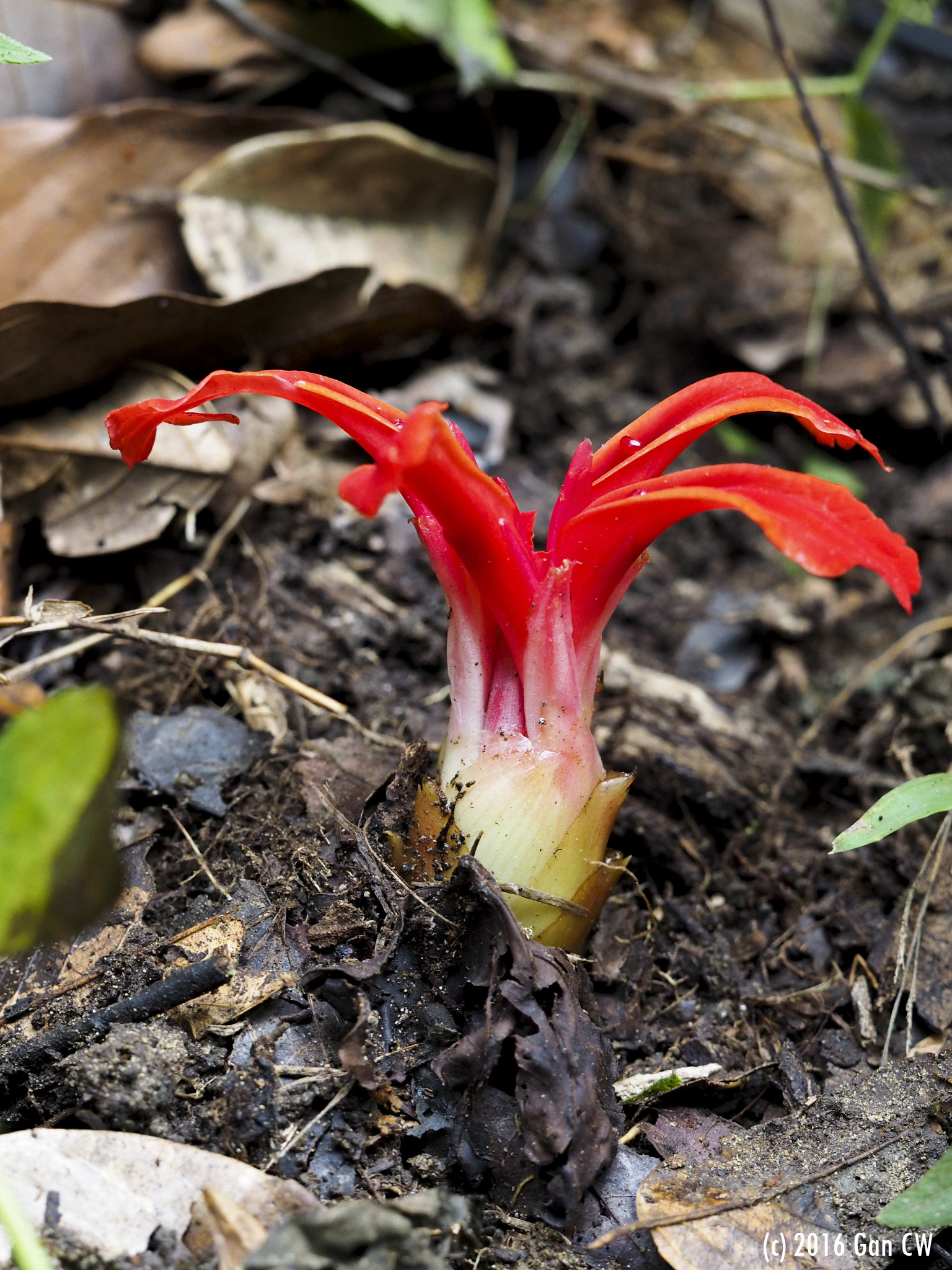

Conservation status
- Least Concern (IUCN 3.1)

Scientific classification
- Kingdom: Plantae
- Clade: Tracheophytes
- Clade: Angiosperms
- Clade: Monocots
- Clade: Commelinids
- Order: Zingiberales
- Family: Zingiberaceae
- Genus: Etlingera
- Species: E. megalocheilos

Binomial name
- Etlingera megalocheilos (Griff.) A.D.Poulsen

Synonyms
- Achasma megalocheilos Griff.; Amomum megalocheilos (Griff.) Baker; Hornstedtia megalocheilos (Griff.) Ridl.; Amomum rubroluteum Baker; Etlingera rubrolutea (Baker) C.K.Lim

= Etlingera megalocheilos =

Species of flowering plant

Etlingera megalocheilos is a monocotyledonous species of flowering plant in the family Zingiberaceae. It was first described by William Griffith, and got its current name from Axel Dalberg Poulsen. Etlingera megalocheilos is part of the genus Etlingera and the family Zingiberaceae. No subspecies are listed in the Catalog of Life.
