= Etlingera australasica =

Scientific classification
- Kingdom: Plantae
- Clade: Tracheophytes
- Clade: Angiosperms
- Clade: Monocots
- Clade: Commelinids
- Order: Zingiberales
- Family: Zingiberaceae
- Genus: Etlingera
- Species: E. australasica

Binomial name
- Etlingera australasica (R.M.Sm.) R.M.Sm

Species of flowering plant

Etlingera australasica is a monocotyledonous plant species that was first described by Rosemary Margaret Smith. Etlingera australasica is part of the genus Etlingera and the family Zingiberaceae. No subspecies are listed in the Catalog of Life.
