= Etlingera longifolia =

Scientific classification
- Kingdom: Plantae
- Clade: Tracheophytes
- Clade: Angiosperms
- Clade: Monocots
- Clade: Commelinids
- Order: Zingiberales
- Family: Zingiberaceae
- Genus: Etlingera
- Species: E. longifolia

Binomial name
- Etlingera longifolia (K.Schum.) A.D.Poulsen

Species of plant

Etlingera longifolia is a monocotyledonous plant species that was first described by Karl Moritz Schumann, and given its current name from Axel Dalberg Poulsen. Etlingera longifolia is part of the genus Etlingera and the family Zingiberaceae. No subspecies are listed in the Catalog of Life.
