= Etlingera purpurea =

Scientific classification
- Kingdom: Plantae
- Clade: Tracheophytes
- Clade: Angiosperms
- Clade: Monocots
- Clade: Commelinids
- Order: Zingiberales
- Family: Zingiberaceae
- Genus: Etlingera
- Species: E. purpurea

Binomial name
- Etlingera purpurea (Elmer) A.D.Poulsen

Synonyms
- Amomum purpureum (Elmer) Merr. Hornstedtia purpurea Elmer

Species of plant

Etlingera purpurea is a monocotyledonous plant species that was first described by Adolph Daniel Edward Elmer, and given its current name from Axel Dalberg Poulsen. Etlingera purpurea is part of the genus Etlingera and the family Zingiberaceae. No subspecies are listed in the Catalog of Life.
