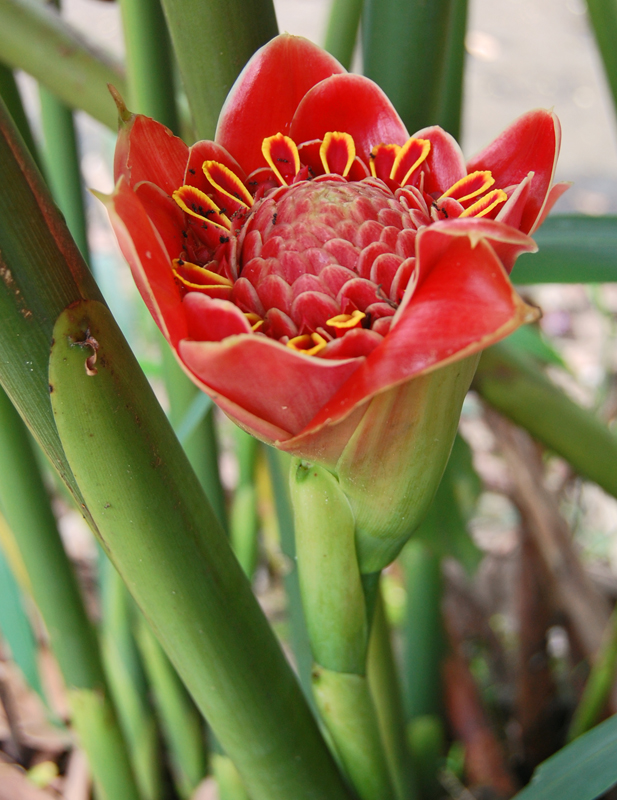

Scientific classification
- Kingdom: Plantae
- Clade: Tracheophytes
- Clade: Angiosperms
- Clade: Monocots
- Clade: Commelinids
- Order: Zingiberales
- Family: Zingiberaceae
- Genus: Etlingera
- Species: E. hemisphaerica

Binomial name
- Etlingera hemisphaerica (Blume) R.M.Sm.

= Etlingera hemisphaerica =

Species of flowering plant

Etlingera hemisphaerica is a monocotyledonous plant species that was first described by Carl Ludwig von Blume, and got its current name by Rosemary Margaret Smith. Etlingera hemisphaerica is part of the genus Etlingera and the family Zingiberaceae. No subspecies are listed in the Catalog of Life.

Etlingera hemisphaerica is endemic to Indonesia, where it is found from Sumatera to Jawa.
