= Etlingera araneosa =

Scientific classification
- Kingdom: Plantae
- Clade: Tracheophytes
- Clade: Angiosperms
- Clade: Monocots
- Clade: Commelinids
- Order: Zingiberales
- Family: Zingiberaceae
- Genus: Etlingera
- Species: E. araneosa

Binomial name
- Etlingera araneosa (Baker) R.M.Sm.

Species of plant

Etlingera araneosa is a monocotyledonous plant species that was first described by John Gilbert Baker, and given its current name by Rosemary Margaret Smith. Etlingera araneosa is part of the genus Etlingera and the family Zingiberaceae. No subspecies are listed in the Catalog of Life.
