= Etlingera nasuta =

Scientific classification
- Kingdom: Plantae
- Clade: Tracheophytes
- Clade: Angiosperms
- Clade: Monocots
- Clade: Commelinids
- Order: Zingiberales
- Family: Zingiberaceae
- Genus: Etlingera
- Species: E. nasuta

Binomial name
- Etlingera nasuta (K.Schum.) R.M.Sm.

Species of plant

Etlingera nasuta is a monocotyledonous plant species that was first described by Karl Moritz Schumann, and given its current name by Rosemary Margaret Smith. Etlingera nasuta is part of the genus Etlingera and the family Zingiberaceae.

== Subspecies ==
The species is divided into the following subspecies:

- Etlingera nasuta subsp. reticulata
- Etlingera nasuta subsp. nasuta
