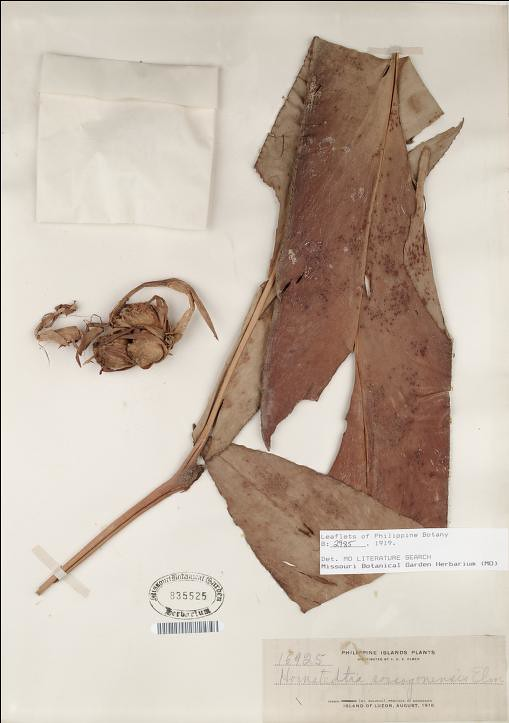

Scientific classification
- Kingdom: Plantae
- Clade: Tracheophytes
- Clade: Angiosperms
- Clade: Monocots
- Clade: Commelinids
- Order: Zingiberales
- Family: Zingiberaceae
- Genus: Etlingera
- Species: E. sorsogonensis

Binomial name
- Etlingera sorsogonensis (Elmer) A.D.Poulsen

Synonyms
- Hornstedtia sorsogonensis Elmer

= Etlingera sorsogonensis =

Species of flowering plant

Etlingera sorsogonensis is a monocotyledonous plant species that was first described by Adolph Daniel Edward Elmer, and given its current name by Axel Dalberg Poulsen. Etlingera sorsogonensis is part of the genus Etlingera and the family Zingiberaceae. No subspecies are listed in the Catalog of Life.
