= Etlingera velutina =

Scientific classification
- Kingdom: Plantae
- Clade: Tracheophytes
- Clade: Angiosperms
- Clade: Monocots
- Clade: Commelinids
- Order: Zingiberales
- Family: Zingiberaceae
- Genus: Etlingera
- Species: E. velutina

Binomial name
- Etlingera velutina (Ridl.) R.M.Sm.

Species of plant

Etlingera velutina is a monocotyledonous plant species first described by Henry Nicholas Ridley, and given its current name by Rosemary Margaret Smith. Etlingera velutina is a member of the genus Etlingera and the family Zingiberaceae .

The species is divided into the following varieties:

- Etlingera var. longipedunculata
- Etlingera var. velutina
