= Etlingera sanguinea =

Scientific classification
- Kingdom: Plantae
- Clade: Tracheophytes
- Clade: Angiosperms
- Clade: Monocots
- Clade: Commelinids
- Order: Zingiberales
- Family: Zingiberaceae
- Genus: Etlingera
- Species: E. sanguinea

Binomial name
- Etlingera sanguinea (Ridl.) R.M.Sm.

Species of plant

Etlingera sanguinea is a monocotyledonous plant species first described by Henry Nicholas Ridley, and given its current name by Rosemary Margaret Smith. Etlingera sanguinea is part of the genus Etlingera and the family Zingiberaceae. No subspecies are listed in the Catalog of Life.
