= Etlingera xanthoparyphe =

Scientific classification
- Kingdom: Plantae
- Clade: Tracheophytes
- Clade: Angiosperms
- Clade: Monocots
- Clade: Commelinids
- Order: Zingiberales
- Family: Zingiberaceae
- Genus: Etlingera
- Species: E. xanthoparyphe

Binomial name
- Etlingera xanthoparyphe (K.Schum.) R.M.Sm.

Species of plant

Etlingera xanthoparyphe is a monocotyledonous plant species that was first described by Karl Moritz Schumann, and given its current name by Rosemary Margaret Smith. Etlingera xanthoparyphe is part of the genus Etlingera and the family Zingiberaceae.

The species' range is Papua New Guinea. No subspecies are listed in the Catalog of Life.
