= Etlingera grandiligulata =

Scientific classification
- Kingdom: Plantae
- Clade: Tracheophytes
- Clade: Angiosperms
- Clade: Monocots
- Clade: Commelinids
- Order: Zingiberales
- Family: Zingiberaceae
- Genus: Etlingera
- Species: E. grandiligulata

Binomial name
- Etlingera grandiligulata (K.Schum.) R.M.Sm.

Species of flowering plant

Etlingera grandiligulata is a monocotyledonous plant species that was first described by Karl Moritz Schumann, and got its current name from Rosemary Margaret Smith. Etlingera grandiligulata is part of the genus Etlingera and the family Zingiberaceae.

The species' range is in Sumatra. No subspecies are listed in the Catalog of Life.
