= Etlingera dalican =

Scientific classification
- Kingdom: Plantae
- Clade: Tracheophytes
- Clade: Angiosperms
- Clade: Monocots
- Clade: Commelinids
- Order: Zingiberales
- Family: Zingiberaceae
- Genus: Etlingera
- Species: E. dalican

Binomial name
- Etlingera dalican (Elmer) A.D.Poulsen

Synonyms
- Amomum dalican (Elmer) Merr. Hornstedtia dalican Elmer

Species of plant

Etlingera dalican is a monocotyledonous plant species that was first described by Adolph Daniel Edward Elmer, and was given its current name by Axel Dalberg Poulsen. Etlingera dalican is part of the genus Etlingera, and the family Zingiberaceae. No subspecies are listed in the Catalog of Life.
