= Etlingera yunnanensis =

Scientific classification
- Kingdom: Plantae
- Clade: Tracheophytes
- Clade: Angiosperms
- Clade: Monocots
- Clade: Commelinids
- Order: Zingiberales
- Family: Zingiberaceae
- Genus: Etlingera
- Species: E. yunnanensis

Binomial name
- Etlingera yunnanensis (T.L.Wu & S.J.Chen) R.M.Sm.

Species of plant

Etlingera yunnanensis is a monocotyledonous plant species first described by Te Lin Wu and Sen Jen Chen, and given its current name by Rosemary Margaret Smith. Etlingera yunnanensis is part of the genus Etlingera and the family Zingiberaceae. No subspecies are listed in the Catalog of Life.
