= Etlingera diepenhorstii =

Scientific classification
- Kingdom: Plantae
- Clade: Tracheophytes
- Clade: Angiosperms
- Clade: Monocots
- Clade: Commelinids
- Order: Zingiberales
- Family: Zingiberaceae
- Genus: Etlingera
- Species: E. diepenhorstii

Binomial name
- Etlingera diepenhorstii (Teijsm. & Binn.) R.M.Sm.

Species of plant

Etlingera diepenhorstii is a monocotyledonous plant species that was first described by Johannes Elias Teijsmann and Simon Binnendijk, and given its current name by Rosemary Margaret Smith. Etlingera diepenhorstii is part of the genus Etlingera and the family Zingiberaceae.

The species' range is in Sumatra. No subspecies are listed in the Catalog of Life.
