= Etlingera valida =

Scientific classification
- Kingdom: Plantae
- Clade: Tracheophytes
- Clade: Angiosperms
- Clade: Monocots
- Clade: Commelinids
- Order: Zingiberales
- Family: Zingiberaceae
- Genus: Etlingera
- Species: E. valida

Binomial name
- Etlingera valida (K.Schum.) A.D.Poulsen

Species of plant

Etlingera valida is a monocotyledonous plant species that was first described by Karl Moritz Schumann, and given its current name by Axel Dalberg Poulsen. Etlingera valida is part of the genus Etlingera and the family Zingiberaceae. The species' range is on Sumatra. No subspecies are listed in the Catalog of Life.
