= Etlingera fimbriobracteata =

Scientific classification
- Kingdom: Plantae
- Clade: Tracheophytes
- Clade: Angiosperms
- Clade: Monocots
- Clade: Commelinids
- Order: Zingiberales
- Family: Zingiberaceae
- Genus: Etlingera
- Species: E. fimbriobracteata

Binomial name
- Etlingera fimbriobracteata (K.Schum.) R.M.Sm.

Species of plant

Etlingera fimbriobracteata is a monocotyledonous plant species that was first described by Karl Moritz Schumann, and received its current name from Rosemary Margaret Smith. Etlingera fimbriobracteata is part of the genus Etlingera and the family Zingiberaceae. No subspecies are listed in the Catalog of Life.
