= Etlingera sayapensis =

Scientific classification
- Kingdom: Plantae
- Clade: Tracheophytes
- Clade: Angiosperms
- Clade: Monocots
- Clade: Commelinids
- Order: Zingiberales
- Family: Zingiberaceae
- Genus: Etlingera
- Species: E. sayapensis

Binomial name
- Etlingera sayapensis A.D.Poulsen & Ibrahim

Species of plant

Etlingera sayapensis is a monocotyledonous plant species described by Axel Dalberg Poulsen and Ibrahim. Etlingera sayapensis is part of the genus Etlingera and the family Zingiberaceae. No subspecies are listed in the Catalog of Life.
