= Etlingera longipetiolata =

Scientific classification
- Kingdom: Plantae
- Clade: Tracheophytes
- Clade: Angiosperms
- Clade: Monocots
- Clade: Commelinids
- Order: Zingiberales
- Family: Zingiberaceae
- Genus: Etlingera
- Species: E. longipetiolata

Binomial name
- Etlingera longipetiolata (B.L.Burtt & R.M.Sm.) R.M.Sm.

Species of plant

Etlingera longipetiolata is a monocotyledonous plant species that was first described by Brian Laurence Burtt and Rosemary Margaret Smith, and given its current name from Rosemary Margaret Smith. Etlingera longipetiolata belongs to the genus Etlingera and the family Zingiberaceae. No subspecies are listed in the Catalog of Life.
