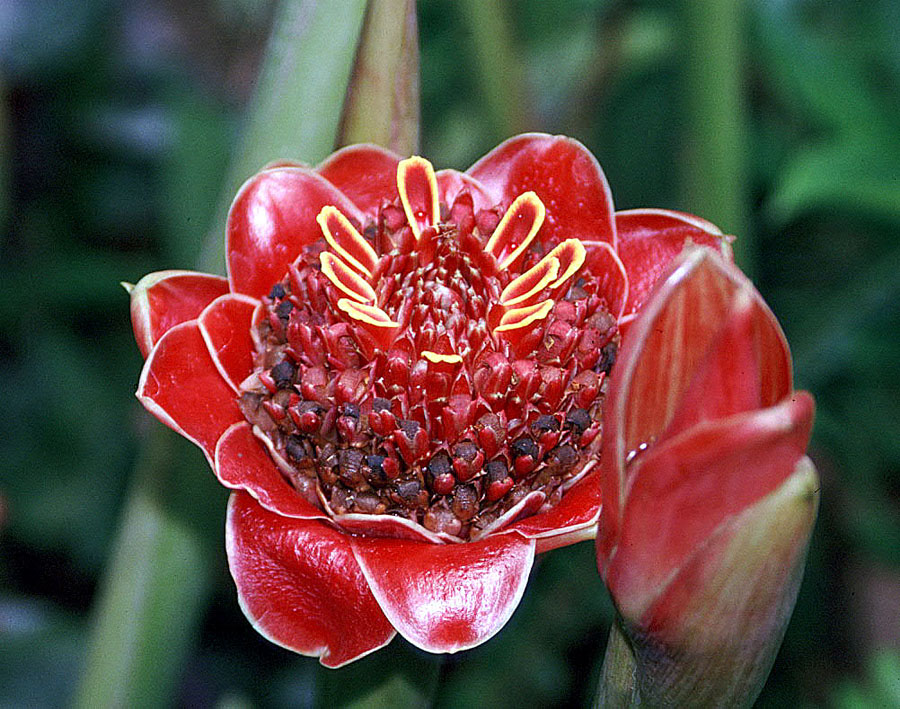

Scientific classification
- Kingdom: Plantae
- Clade: Tracheophytes
- Clade: Angiosperms
- Clade: Monocots
- Clade: Commelinids
- Order: Zingiberales
- Family: Zingiberaceae
- Genus: Etlingera
- Species: E. solaris

Binomial name
- Etlingera solaris (Blume) R.M.Sm.

= Etlingera solaris =

Species of flowering plant

Etlingera solaris is a monocotyledonous plant species first described by Carl Ludwig von Blume, and given its current name by Rosemary Margaret Smith. Etlingera solaris is part of the genus Etlingera and the family Zingiberaceae. No subspecies are listed in the Catalog of Life.
