= Etlingera baculutea =

Scientific classification
- Kingdom: Plantae
- Clade: Tracheophytes
- Clade: Angiosperms
- Clade: Monocots
- Clade: Commelinids
- Order: Zingiberales
- Family: Zingiberaceae
- Genus: Etlingera
- Species: E. baculutea

Binomial name
- Etlingera baculutea A.D.Poulsen & Ibrahim

Species of flowering plant

Etlingera baculutea is a monocotyledonous plant species described by Axel Dalberg Poulsen and Ibrahim. Etlingera baculutea is part of the genus Etlingera and the family Zingiberaceae. No subspecies are listed in the Catalog of Life.
