= Etlingera triorgyalis =

Scientific classification
- Kingdom: Plantae
- Clade: Tracheophytes
- Clade: Angiosperms
- Clade: Monocots
- Clade: Commelinids
- Order: Zingiberales
- Family: Zingiberaceae
- Genus: Etlingera
- Species: E. triorgyalis

Binomial name
- Etlingera triorgyalis (Baker) R.M.Sm.

Species of flowering plant

Etlingera triorgyalis is a monocotyledonous plant species that was first described by John Gilbert Baker, and got its current name by Rosemary Margaret Smith. Etlingera triorgyalis is part of the genus Etlingera and the family Zingiberaceae. No subspecies are listed in the Catalog of Life.
