= Etlingera muluensis =

Scientific classification
- Kingdom: Plantae
- Clade: Tracheophytes
- Clade: Angiosperms
- Clade: Monocots
- Clade: Commelinids
- Order: Zingiberales
- Family: Zingiberaceae
- Genus: Etlingera
- Species: E. muluensis

Binomial name
- Etlingera muluensis R.M.Sm.

Species of plant

Etlingera muluensis is a monocotyledonous plant species described by Rosemary Margaret Smith. Etlingera muluensis is part of the genus Etlingera and the family Zingiberaceae. No subspecies are listed in the Catalog of Life.
