= Etlingera rosea =

Scientific classification
- Kingdom: Plantae
- Clade: Tracheophytes
- Clade: Angiosperms
- Clade: Monocots
- Clade: Commelinids
- Order: Zingiberales
- Family: Zingiberaceae
- Genus: Etlingera
- Species: E. rosea

Binomial name
- Etlingera rosea B.L.Burtt & R.M.Sm.

Species of plant

Etlingera rosea is a monocotyledonous plant species described by Brian Laurence Burtt and Rosemary Margaret Smith. Etlingera rosea is part of the genus Etlingera and the family Zingiberaceae.

The species' range is the Moluccas. No subspecies are listed in the Catalog of Life.
