= Etlingera insolita =

Scientific classification
- Kingdom: Plantae
- Clade: Tracheophytes
- Clade: Angiosperms
- Clade: Monocots
- Clade: Commelinids
- Order: Zingiberales
- Family: Zingiberaceae
- Genus: Etlingera
- Species: E. insolita

Binomial name
- Etlingera insolita A.D.Poulsen

Species of flowering plant

Etlingera insolita is a monocotyledonous plant species described by Axel Dalberg Poulsen. Etlingera insolita is part of the genus Etlingera and the family Zingiberaceae.
