= Etlingera loroglossa =

Scientific classification
- Kingdom: Plantae
- Clade: Tracheophytes
- Clade: Angiosperms
- Clade: Monocots
- Clade: Commelinids
- Order: Zingiberales
- Family: Zingiberaceae
- Genus: Etlingera
- Species: E. loroglossa

Binomial name
- Etlingera loroglossa (Gagnep.) R.M.Sm.

Synonyms
- Achasma loroglossum (Gagnep.) K.Larsen; Amomum loroglossum Gagnep.; Hornstedtia loroglossa (Gagnep.) K.Schum.

Species of flowering plant

Etlingera loroglossa is a monocotyledonous plant species that was first described by François Gagnepain, and was given its current name by Rosemary Margaret Smith. Etlingera loroglossa is part of the genus Etlingera and the family Zingiberaceae.

The range of the species is Assam in India. No subspecies are listed in the Catalog of Life.
