= Etlingera cevuga =

Scientific classification
- Kingdom: Plantae
- Clade: Embryophytes
- Clade: Tracheophytes
- Clade: Angiosperms
- Clade: Monocots
- Clade: Commelinids
- Order: Zingiberales
- Family: Zingiberaceae
- Genus: Etlingera
- Species: E. cevuga

Binomial name
- Etlingera cevuga (Seem.) R.M.Sm.

Synonyms
- Amomum cevuga Seem.; Amomum vignaui Rech.; Cardamomum cevuga (Seem.) Kuntze; Geanthus cevuga (Seem.) Loes.; Geanthus vignaui (Rech.) Loes.

Species of plant

Etlingera cevuga is a species of flowering plant in the family Zingiberaceae. It is a monocotyledonous rhizomatous geophyte native to Fiji, the Samoan Islands, and the Society Islands in the tropical Pacific.

It was first described as Amomum cevuga by Berthold Carl Seemann in 1868, and given its current name by Rosemary Margaret Smith in 1986. No subspecies are listed in the Catalog of Life.
