= Etlingera heliconiifolia =

Scientific classification
- Kingdom: Plantae
- Clade: Tracheophytes
- Clade: Angiosperms
- Clade: Monocots
- Clade: Commelinids
- Order: Zingiberales
- Family: Zingiberaceae
- Genus: Etlingera
- Species: E. heliconiifolia

Binomial name
- Etlingera heliconiifolia (K.Schum.) A.D.Poulsen

Species of flowering plant

Etlingera heliconiifolia is a monocotyledonous plant species that was first described by Karl Moritz Schumann, and got its current name from Axel Dalberg Poulsen. Etlingera heliconiifolia is part of the genus Etlingera and the family Zingiberaceae. No subspecies are listed in the Catalog of Life.
