= Etlingera kenyalang =

Scientific classification
- Kingdom: Plantae
- Clade: Tracheophytes
- Clade: Angiosperms
- Clade: Monocots
- Clade: Commelinids
- Order: Zingiberales
- Family: Zingiberaceae
- Genus: Etlingera
- Species: E. kenyalang

Binomial name
- Etlingera kenyalang A.D.Poulsen & H.Chr.

Species of plant

Etlingera kenyalang is a monocotyledonous plant species described by Axel Dalberg Poulsen and H.Chr. Etlingera kenyalang is part of the genus Etlingera and the family Zingiberaceae. No subspecies are listed in the Catalog of Life.
