= Etlingera dictyota =

Scientific classification
- Kingdom: Plantae
- Clade: Tracheophytes
- Clade: Angiosperms
- Clade: Monocots
- Clade: Commelinids
- Order: Zingiberales
- Family: Zingiberaceae
- Genus: Etlingera
- Species: E. dictyota

Binomial name
- Etlingera dictyota A.D.Poulsen & A.L.Lamb

Species of plant

Etlingera dictyota is a monocotyledonous plant species described by Axel Dalberg Poulsen and Anthony L. Lamb. Etlingera dictyota is part of the genus Etlingera and the family Zingiberaceae. No subspecies are listed in the Catalog of Life.
