= Etlingera metriocheilos =

Conservation status
- Least Concern (IUCN 3.1)

Scientific classification
- Kingdom: Plantae
- Clade: Embryophytes
- Clade: Tracheophytes
- Clade: Spermatophytes
- Clade: Angiosperms
- Clade: Monocots
- Clade: Commelinids
- Order: Zingiberales
- Family: Zingiberaceae
- Genus: Etlingera
- Species: E. metriocheilos

Binomial name
- Etlingera metriocheilos (Griff.) R.M.Sm.

Synonyms
- Achasma metriocheilos Griff.; Amomum metriocheilos (Griff.) Baker; Hornstedtia metriocheilos (Griff.) Ridl.; Achasma sphaerocephalum (Baker) Holttum; Achasma sphaerocephalum var. grandiflorum Holttum; Achasma sphaerocephalum var. majus Holttum; Achasma sphaerocephalum var. petiolatum Holttum; Amomum sphaerocephalum Baker; Etlingera metriocheilos var. grandiflora (Holttum) I.M.Turner; Etlingera metriocheilos var. major (Holttum) I.M.Turner; Etlingera metriocheilos var. petiolata (Holttum) I.M.Turner; Etlingera sphaerocephala (Baker) C.K.Lim; Etlingera sphaerocephala var. grandiflora (Holttum) C.K.Lim; Etlingera sphaerocephala var. major (Holttum) C.K.Lim; Etlingera sphaerocephala var. petiolata (Holttum) C.K.Lim; Hornstedtia albomarginata Ridl.; Hornstedtia spathulata Ridl.; Hornstedtia sphaerocephala (Baker) K.Schum.

Species of flowering plant

Etlingera metriocheilos is a species of monocotyledonous flowering plant in the family Zingiberaceae. It was first described by William Griffiths, and revised by Rosemary Margaret Smith.
