= Etlingera philippinensis =

Scientific classification
- Kingdom: Plantae
- Clade: Tracheophytes
- Clade: Angiosperms
- Clade: Monocots
- Clade: Commelinids
- Order: Zingiberales
- Family: Zingiberaceae
- Genus: Etlingera
- Species: E. philippinensis

Binomial name
- Etlingera philippinensis (Ridl.) R.M.Sm.

Species of plant

Etlingera philippinensis is a monocotyledonous plant species first described by Henry Nicholas Ridley, and given its current name by Rosemary Margaret Smith. Etlingera philippinensis is part of the genus Etlingera and the family Zingiberaceae.

The species' range is the Philippines. No subspecies are listed in the Catalog of Life.
