= Etlingera punicea =

Scientific classification
- Kingdom: Plantae
- Clade: Tracheophytes
- Clade: Angiosperms
- Clade: Monocots
- Clade: Commelinids
- Order: Zingiberales
- Family: Zingiberaceae
- Genus: Etlingera
- Species: E. punicea

Binomial name
- Etlingera punicea (Roxb.) R.M.Sm.

Species of plant

Etlingera punicea is a monocotyledonous plant species that was first described by William Roxburgh, and given its current name from Rosemary Margaret Smith. Etlingera punicea is part of the genus Etlingera and the family Zingiberaceae.

The species' range is on Sumatra. No subspecies are listed in the Catalog of Life.
