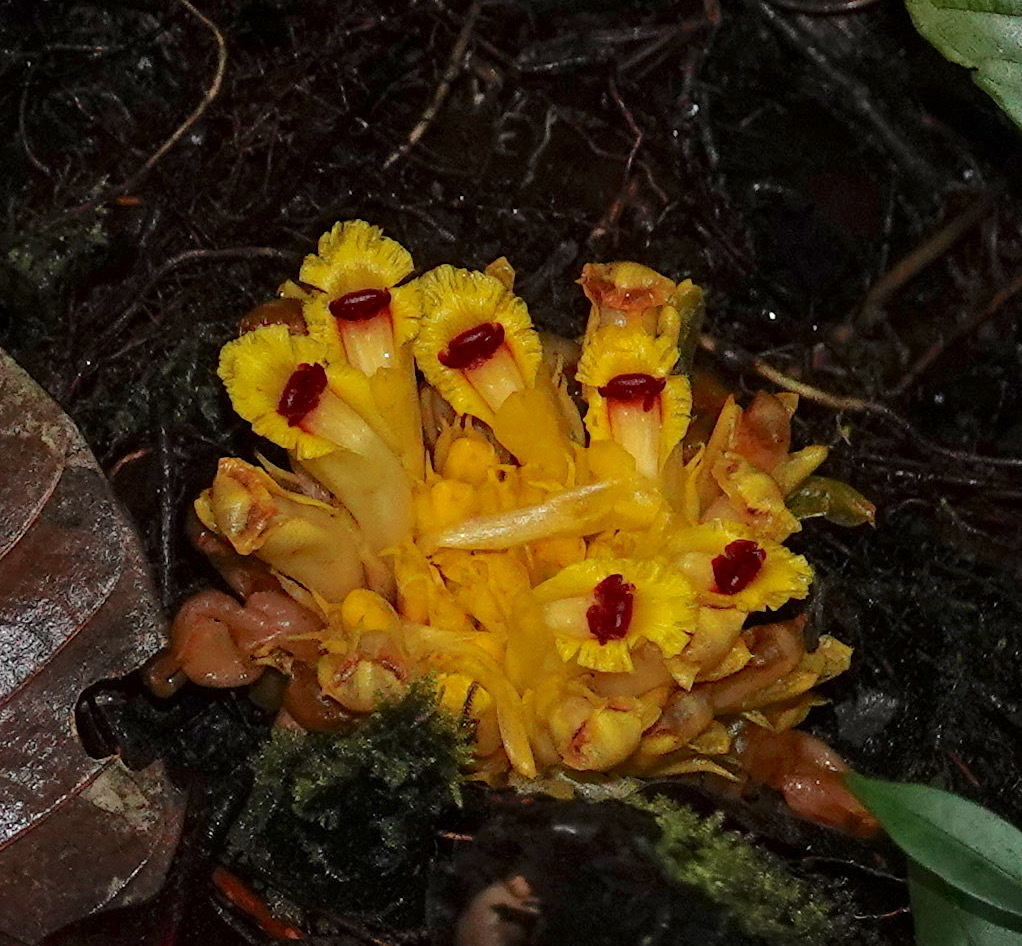

Scientific classification
- Kingdom: Plantae
- Clade: Tracheophytes
- Clade: Angiosperms
- Clade: Monocots
- Clade: Commelinids
- Order: Zingiberales
- Family: Zingiberaceae
- Genus: Etlingera
- Species: E. burttii

Binomial name
- Etlingera burttii A.D.Poulsen

= Etlingera burttii =

Species of plant

Etlingera burttii is a monocotyledonous plant species described by Axel Dalberg Poulsen. Etlingera burttii is part of the genus Etlingera and the family Zingiberaceae. No subspecies are listed in the Catalog of Life.

== Range ==
Its native range is in Borneo (Sabah, Sarawak).
