= Etlingera sericea =

Scientific classification
- Kingdom: Plantae
- Clade: Tracheophytes
- Clade: Angiosperms
- Clade: Monocots
- Clade: Commelinids
- Order: Zingiberales
- Family: Zingiberaceae
- Genus: Etlingera
- Species: E. sericea

Binomial name
- Etlingera sericea (Ridl.) R.M.Sm.

Species of plant

Etlingera sericea is a monocotyledonous plant species first described by Henry Nicholas Ridley, and given its current name by Rosemary Margaret Smith. Etlingera sericea is part of the genus Etlingera and the family Zingiberaceae.

The species' range is Sumatra. No subspecies are listed in the Catalog of Life.
