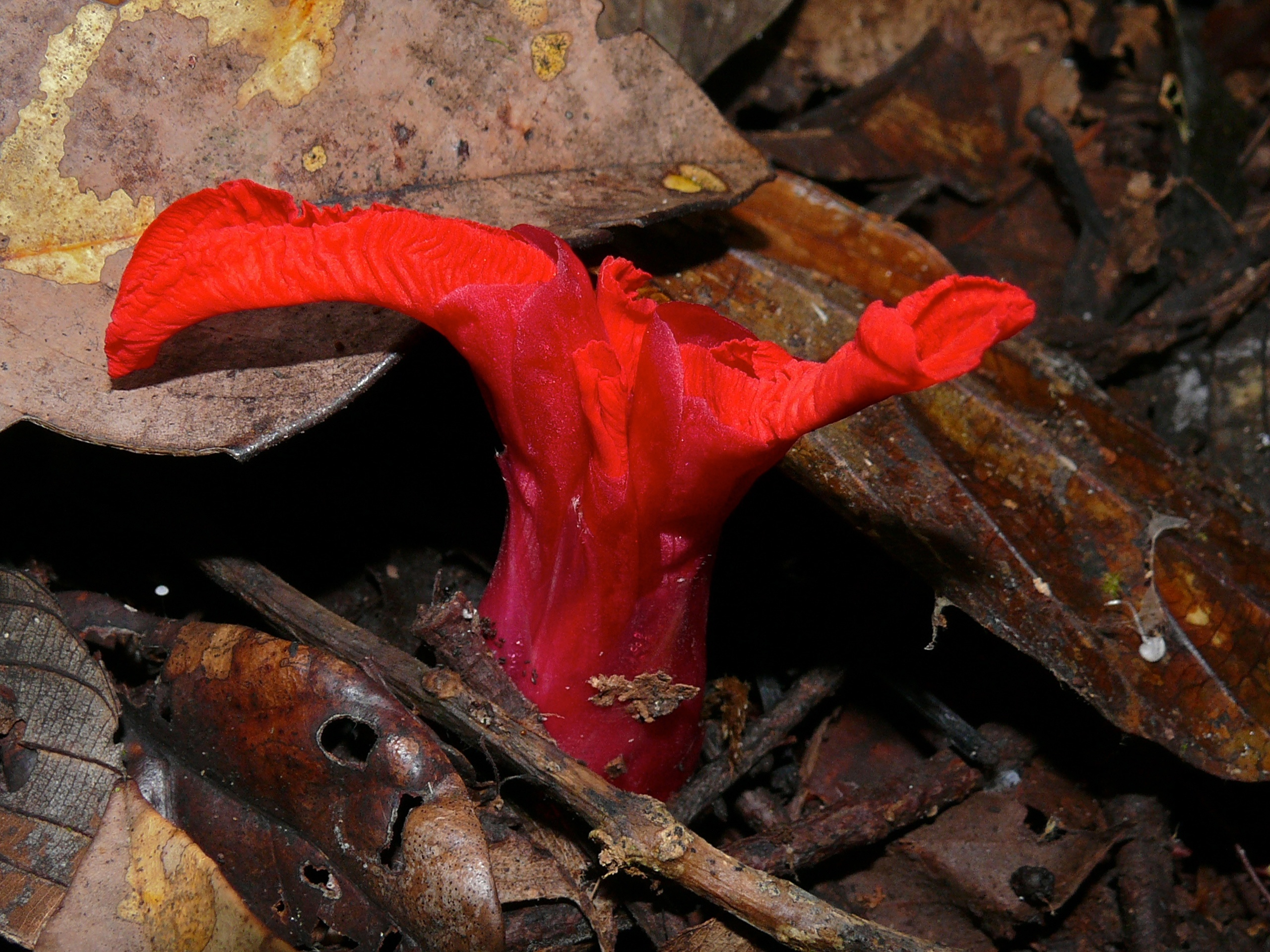
- Etlingera inundata

Scientific classification
- Kingdom: Plantae
- Clade: Tracheophytes
- Clade: Angiosperms
- Clade: Monocots
- Clade: Commelinids
- Order: Zingiberales
- Family: Zingiberaceae
- Genus: Etlingera
- Species: E. inundata

Binomial name
- Etlingera inundata S.Sakai & Nagam.

= Etlingera inundata =

Species of plant

Etlingera inundata is a monocotyledonous plant species described by S. Sakai and Hidetoshi Nagamasu. Etlingera inundata is part of the genus Etlingera and the family Zingiberaceae. No subspecies are listed in the Catalog of Life.
