= Etlingera palangkensis =

Scientific classification
- Kingdom: Plantae
- Clade: Tracheophytes
- Clade: Angiosperms
- Clade: Monocots
- Clade: Commelinids
- Order: Zingiberales
- Family: Zingiberaceae
- Genus: Etlingera
- Species: E. palangkensis

Binomial name
- Etlingera palangkensis A.Takano & Nagam.

Species of plant

Etlingera palangkensis is a monocotyledonous plant species described by A. Takano and Hidetoshi Nagamasu. Etlingera palangkensis is part of the genus Etlingera and the family Zingiberaceae. No subspecies are listed in the Catalog of Life.
