= Amomum borneense =

Scientific classification
- Kingdom: Plantae
- Clade: Tracheophytes
- Clade: Angiosperms
- Clade: Monocots
- Clade: Commelinids
- Order: Zingiberales
- Family: Zingiberaceae
- Genus: Amomum
- Species: A. borneense

Binomial name
- Amomum borneense (K.Schum.) R.M.Sm.

Species of plant

Amomum borneense is a monocotyledonous plant species that was first described by Karl Moritz Schumann, and given its current name from Rosemary Margaret Smith. Amomum borneense is part of the genus Amomum and the family Zingiberaceae. No subspecies are listed in the Catalog of Life.
