= Plagiostachys crocydocalyx =

Scientific classification
- Kingdom: Plantae
- Clade: Tracheophytes
- Clade: Angiosperms
- Clade: Monocots
- Clade: Commelinids
- Order: Zingiberales
- Family: Zingiberaceae
- Genus: Plagiostachys
- Species: P. crocydocalyx

Binomial name
- Plagiostachys crocydocalyx (K.Schum.) B.L.Burtt & R.M Sm.

Species of flowering plant

Plagiostachys crocydocalyx is a monocotyledonous plant species first described by Karl Moritz Schumann, and given its current name by Brian Laurence Burtt and Rosemary Margaret Smith. Plagiostachys crocydocalyx is part of the genus Plagiostachys and the family Zingiberaceae. No subspecies are listed in the Catalog of Life.
