= Etlingera brachychila =

Scientific classification
- Kingdom: Plantae
- Clade: Tracheophytes
- Clade: Angiosperms
- Clade: Monocots
- Clade: Commelinids
- Order: Zingiberales
- Family: Zingiberaceae
- Genus: Etlingera
- Species: E. brachychila

Binomial name
- Etlingera brachychila (Ridl.) R.M.Sm.

Species of plant

Etlingera brachychila is a monocotyledonous plant species first described by Henry Nicholas Ridley, and given its current name by Rosemary Margaret Smith. Etlingera brachychila belongs to the genus Etlingera and the family Zingiberaceae.

== Varieties ==
The species is divided into the following varieties:

- Etlingera brachychila var. brachychila
- Etlingera brachychila var. vinosa
