= Scaphochlamys polyphylla =

Scientific classification
- Kingdom: Plantae
- Clade: Tracheophytes
- Clade: Angiosperms
- Clade: Monocots
- Clade: Commelinids
- Order: Zingiberales
- Family: Zingiberaceae
- Genus: Scaphochlamys
- Species: S. polyphylla

Binomial name
- Scaphochlamys polyphylla (K.Schum.) B.L.Burtt & R.M.Sm.

Species of flowering plant

Scaphochlamys polyphylla is a monocotyledonous plant species that was first described by Karl Moritz Schumann, and got its current name from Brian Laurence Burtt and Rosemary Margaret Smith. Scaphochlamys polyphylla is part of the genus Scaphochlamys and the family Zingiberaceae. No subspecies are listed in the Catalog of Life.
