= Plagiostachys albiflora =

Scientific classification
- Kingdom: Plantae
- Clade: Tracheophytes
- Clade: Angiosperms
- Clade: Monocots
- Clade: Commelinids
- Order: Zingiberales
- Family: Zingiberaceae
- Genus: Plagiostachys
- Species: P. albiflora

Binomial name
- Plagiostachys albiflora Ridl.

Species of flowering plant

Plagiostachys albiflora is a monocotyledonous plant species. It is part of the genus Plagiostachys and the family Zingiberaceae.
