= Etlingera pauciflora =

Scientific classification
- Kingdom: Plantae
- Clade: Tracheophytes
- Clade: Angiosperms
- Clade: Monocots
- Clade: Commelinids
- Order: Zingiberales
- Family: Zingiberaceae
- Genus: Etlingera
- Species: E. pauciflora

Binomial name
- Etlingera pauciflora (Ridl.) R.M.Sm.

Species of flowering plant

Etlingera pauciflora is a monocotyledonous plant species that was first described by Henry Nicholas Ridley, and was given its current name by Rosemary Margaret Smith. Etlingera pauciflora is part of the genus Etlingera and the family Zingiberaceae. No subspecies are listed in the Catalog of Life.
