= Etlingera baramensis =

Scientific classification
- Kingdom: Plantae
- Clade: Tracheophytes
- Clade: Angiosperms
- Clade: Monocots
- Clade: Commelinids
- Order: Zingiberales
- Family: Zingiberaceae
- Genus: Etlingera
- Species: E. baramensis

Binomial name
- Etlingera baramensis S.Sakai & Nagam.

Species of plant

Etlingera baramensis is a monocotyledonous plant species described by S. Sakai and Hidetoshi Nagamasu. Etlingera baramensis is part of the genus Etlingera and the family Zingiberaceae. No subspecies are listed in the Catalog of Life.
