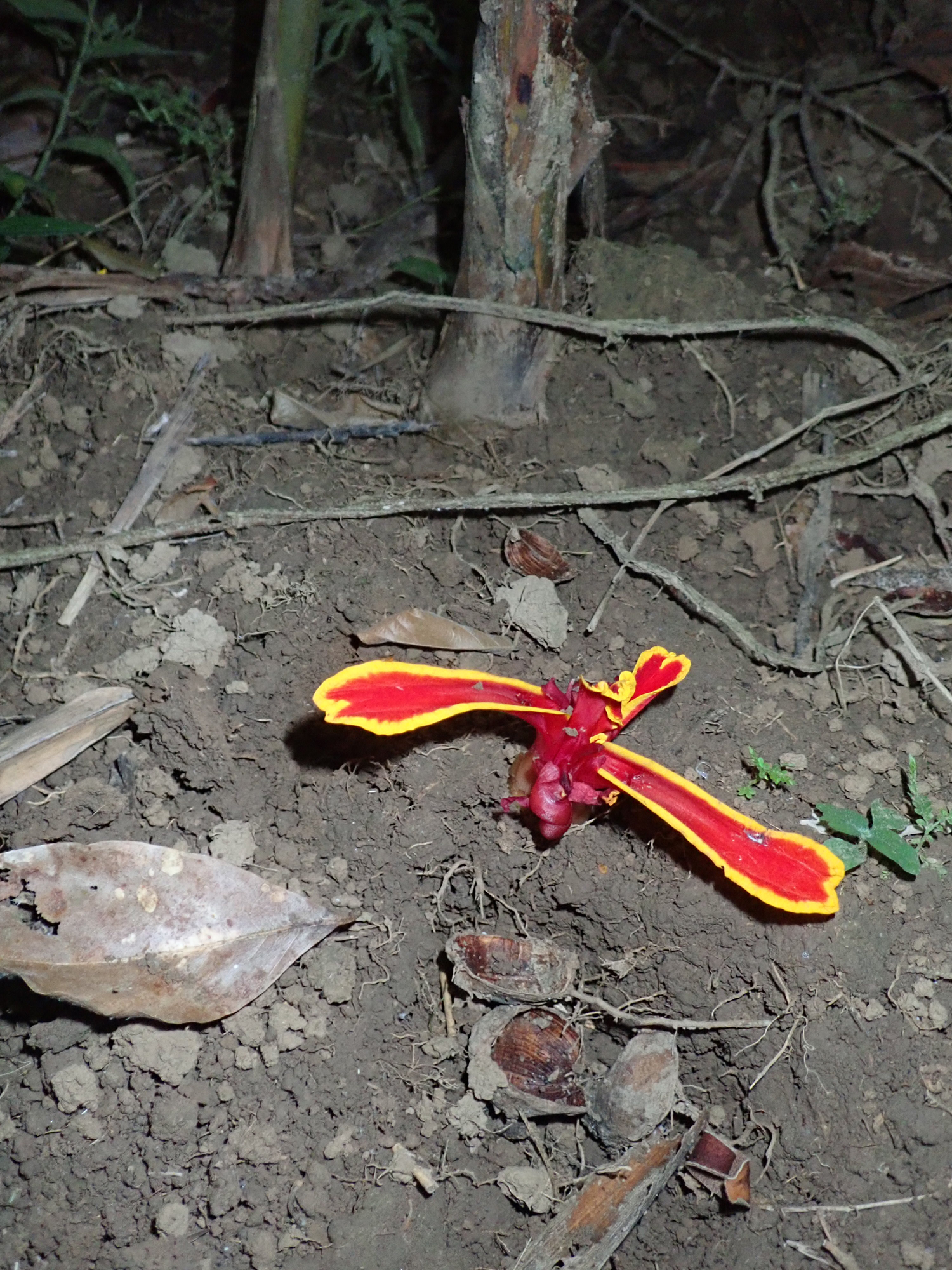
- Flower and stem base: from Cat Tien National Park

Scientific classification
- Kingdom: Plantae
- Clade: Tracheophytes
- Clade: Angiosperms
- Clade: Monocots
- Clade: Commelinids
- Order: Zingiberales
- Family: Zingiberaceae
- Genus: Etlingera
- Species: E. littoralis

Binomial name
- Etlingera littoralis (J.König) Giseke, 1792

Synonyms
- Cardamomum littorale (J.König) Kuntze Amomum littorale J.König

= Etlingera littoralis =

Species of flowering plant

Etlingera littoralis is a species of flowering plant in the family Zingiberaceae (gingers), with no subspecies listed in the Catalogue of Life. It is found in lowland tropical forest floors (up to 300 m) in Hainan, Indo-China and Malesia.

== Gallery ==
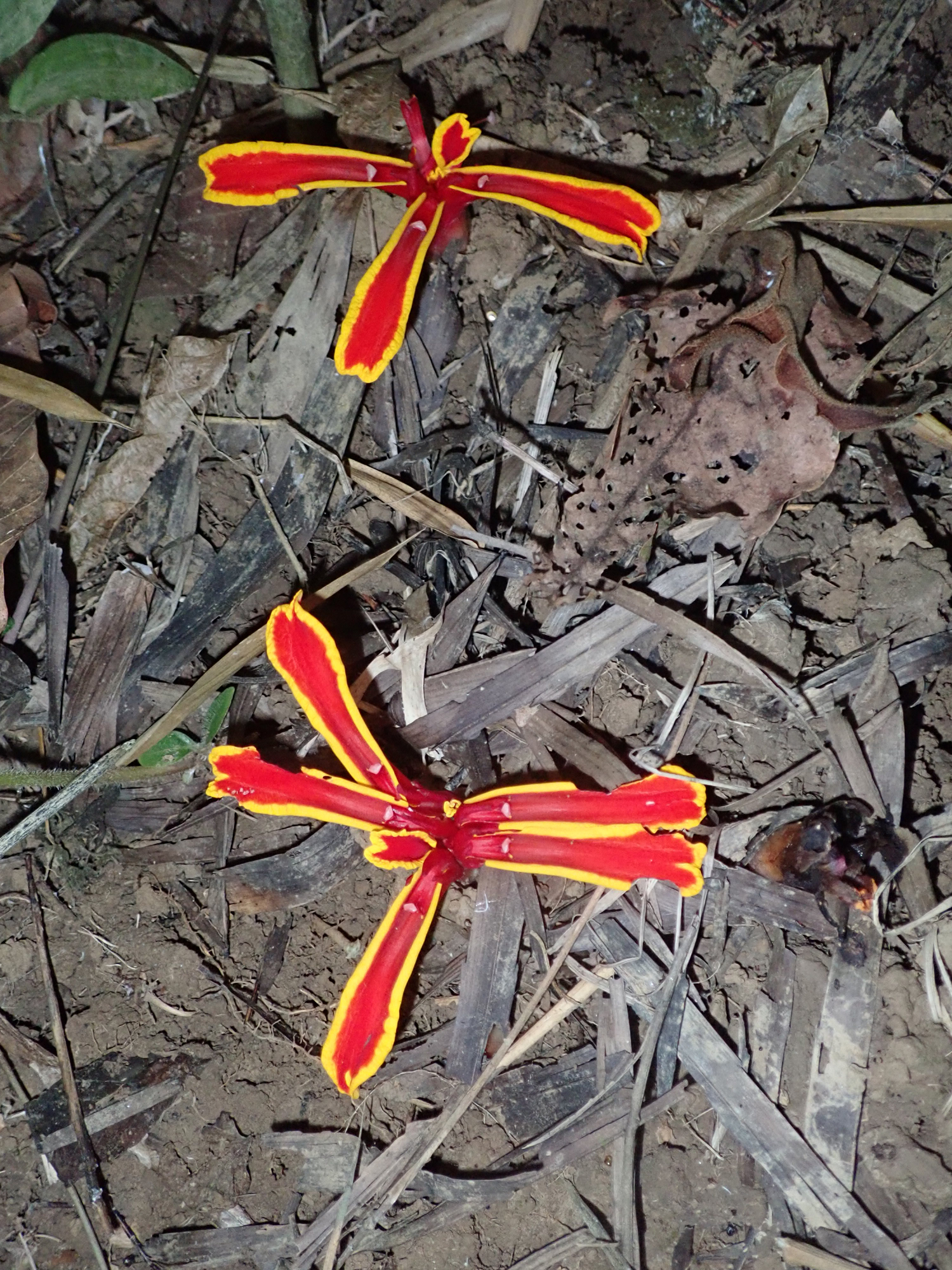

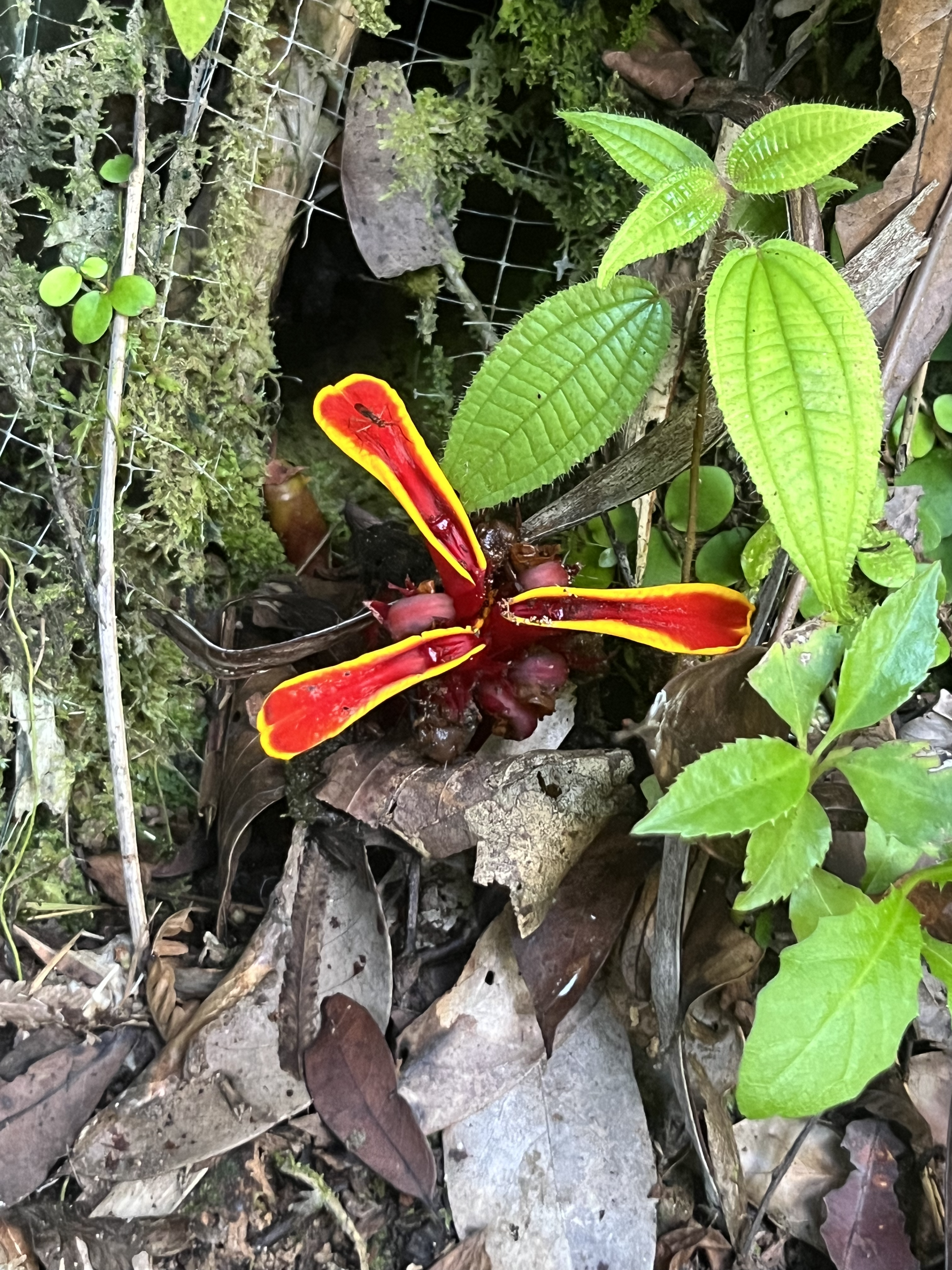
Etlingera littoralis flower in Malaysia
