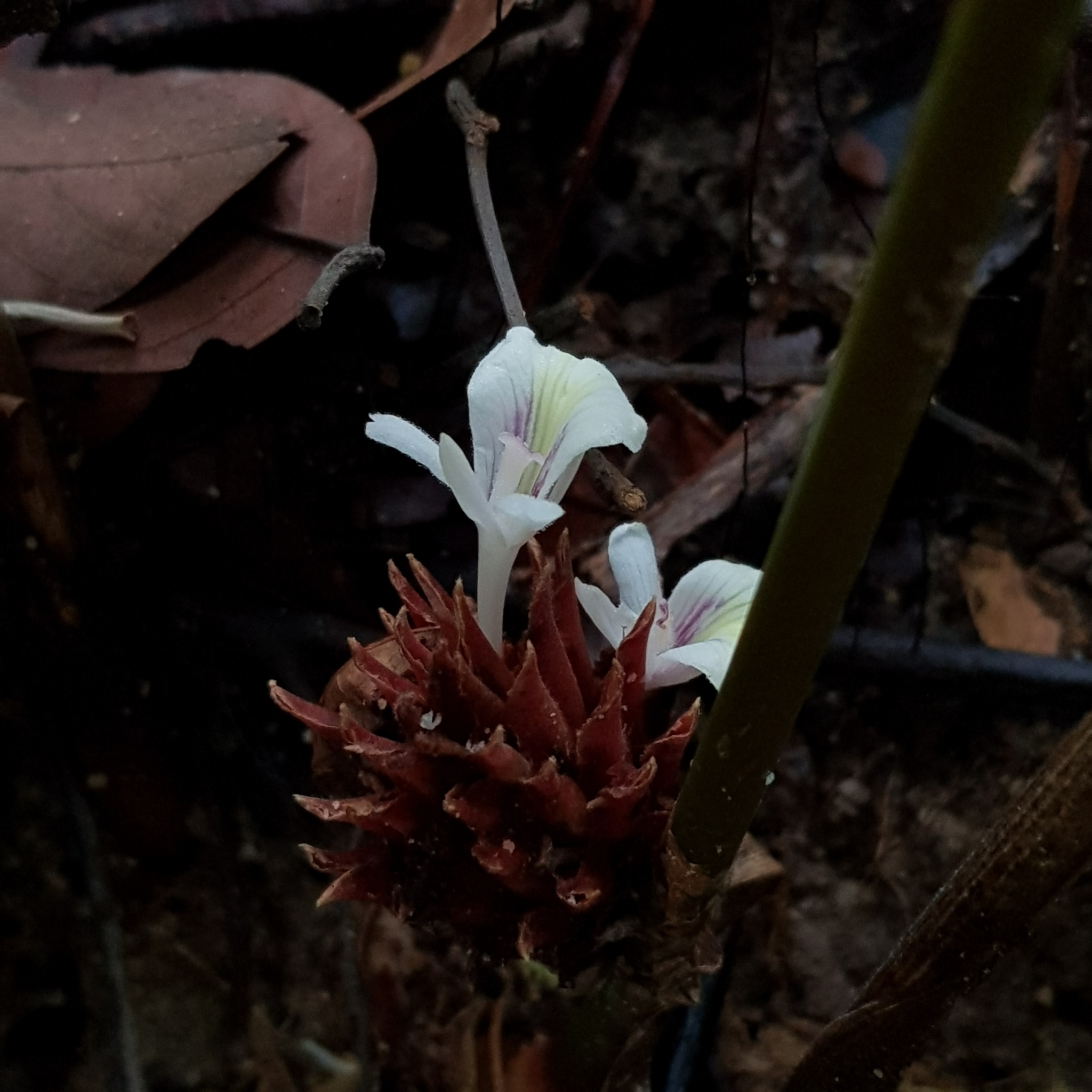
- Scaphochlamys breviscapa in Singapore

Scientific classification
- Kingdom: Plantae
- Clade: Tracheophytes
- Clade: Angiosperms
- Clade: Monocots
- Clade: Commelinids
- Order: Zingiberales
- Family: Zingiberaceae
- Subfamily: Zingiberoideae
- Tribe: Zingibereae
- Genus: Scaphochlamys; Baker

Type species
- Scaphochlamys malaccana Baker

= Scaphochlamys =

Genus of flowering plants

Scaphochlamys is a genus of plants in the ginger family. It is native to Southeast Asia (Thailand, Singapore, Borneo and Malaysia).

== Species and varieties ==
- Scaphochlamys anomala (Hallier f.) R.J.Searle, (2010).
- Scaphochlamys argentea R.M.Sm., (1987).
- Scaphochlamys atroviridis Holttum, (1950).
- Scaphochlamys biloba (Ridl.) Holttum, (1950).
- Scaphochlamys breviscapa Holttum, (1950).
- Scaphochlamys burkillii Holttum, (1950).
- Scaphochlamys calcicola A.D.Poulsen & R.J.Searle, (2005).
- Scaphochlamys concinna (Baker) Holttum, (1950).
- Scaphochlamys cordata Y.Y.Sam & Saw, (2005).
- Scaphochlamys erecta Holttu, (1950).
- Scaphochlamys gracilipes (K.Schum.) S.Sakai & Nagam., (2006).
- Scaphochlamys grandis Holttum, (1950).
- Scaphochlamys klossii (Ridl.) Holttum, (1950).
  - Scaphochlamys klossii var. klossii
  - Scaphochlamys klossii var. glomerata Holttum, (1950).
  - Scaphochlamys klossii var. minor Holttum, (1950).
- Scaphochlamys kunstleri (Baker) Holttum, (1950).
  - Scaphochlamys kunstleri var. kunstleri.
  - Scaphochlamys kunstleri var. rubra (Ridl.) Holttum, (1950).
  - Scaphochlamys kunstleri var. speciosa C.K.Lim, (2001).
- Scaphochlamys lanceolata (Ridl.) Holttum, (1950).
- Scaphochlamys laxa Y.Y.Sam & Saw, (2005).
- Scaphochlamys malaccana Baker, (1892).
- Scaphochlamys minutiflora Jenjitt. & K.Larsen, (2002).
- Scaphochlamys obcordata Sirirugsa & K.Larsen, (1991).
- Scaphochlamys oculata (Ridl.) Holttum, (1950).
- Scaphochlamys pennipicta Holttum, (1950).
- Scaphochlamys perakensis Holttum, (1950).
- Scaphochlamys petiolata (K.Schum.) R.M.Sm., (1987).
- Scaphochlamys polyphylla (K.Schum.) B.L.Burtt & R.M.Sm., (1972).
- Scaphochlamys reticosa (Ridl.) R.M.Sm., (1987).
- Scaphochlamys rubescens Jenjitt. & K.Larsen, (2002).
- Scaphochlamys rubromaculata Holttum, (1950).
- Scaphochlamys subbiloba (Burkill ex Ridl.) Holttum, (1950).
- Scaphochlamys sylvestris (Ridl.) Holttum, (1950).
- Scaphochlamys tenuis Holttum, (1950).
