= Scaphochlamys reticosa =

Scientific classification
- Kingdom: Plantae
- Clade: Tracheophytes
- Clade: Angiosperms
- Clade: Monocots
- Clade: Commelinids
- Order: Zingiberales
- Family: Zingiberaceae
- Genus: Scaphochlamys
- Species: S. reticosa

Binomial name
- Scaphochlamys reticosa (Ridl.) R.M.Sm.

Species of flowering plant

Scaphochlamys reticosa is a monocotyledonous plant species first described by Henry Nicholas Ridley, and given its current name by Rosemary Margaret Smith. Scaphochlamys reticosa is part of the genus Scaphochlamys and the family Zingiberaceae. No subspecies are listed in the Catalog of Life.
