= Etlingera pubescens =

Scientific classification
- Kingdom: Plantae
- Clade: Tracheophytes
- Clade: Angiosperms
- Clade: Monocots
- Clade: Commelinids
- Order: Zingiberales
- Family: Zingiberaceae
- Genus: Etlingera
- Species: E. pubescens

Binomial name
- Etlingera pubescens (B.L.Burtt & R.M.Sm.) R.M.Sm.

Species of flowering plant

Etlingera pubescens is a monocotyledonous plant species that was first described by Brian Laurence Burtt and Rosemary Margaret Smith, and was given its current name by Rosemary Margaret Smith. Etlingera pubescens is part of the genus Etlingera and the family Zingiberaceae. No subspecies are listed in the Catalog of Life.
