= Scaphochlamys argentea =

Scientific classification
- Kingdom: Plantae
- Clade: Tracheophytes
- Clade: Angiosperms
- Clade: Monocots
- Clade: Commelinids
- Order: Zingiberales
- Family: Zingiberaceae
- Genus: Scaphochlamys
- Species: S. argentea

Binomial name
- Scaphochlamys argentea R.M.Sm.

Species of flowering plant

Scaphochlamys argentea is a monocotyledonous plant species described by Rosemary Margaret Smith. Scaphochlamys argentea belongs to the genus Scaphochlamys and the family Zingiberaceae. There are no subspecies are listed in the Catalog of Life.
