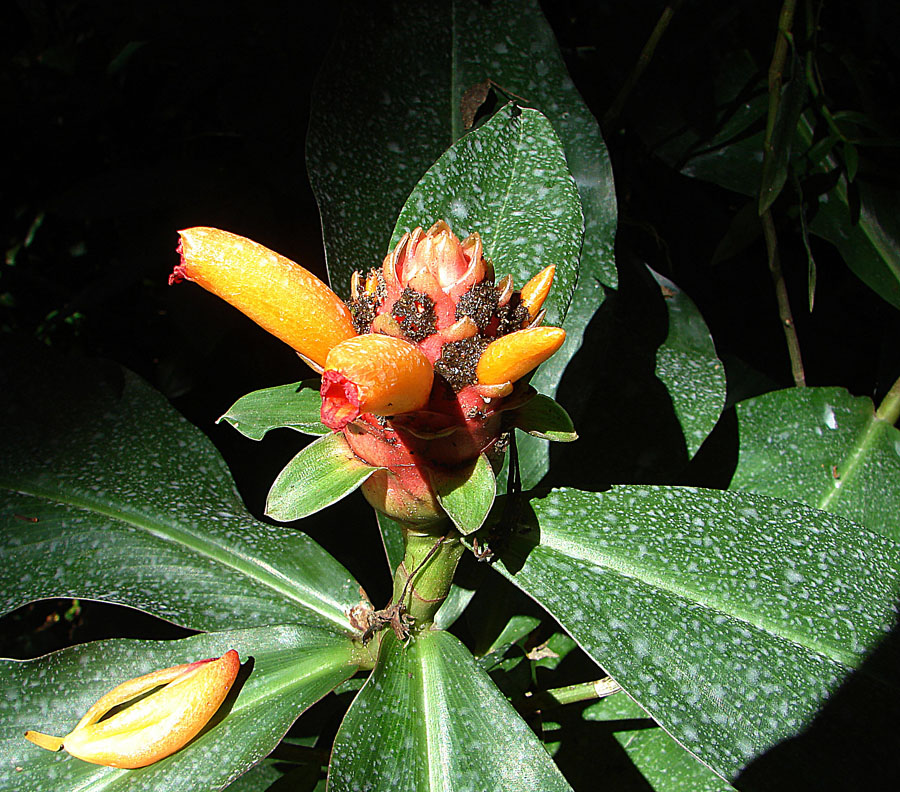

Scientific classification
- Kingdom: Plantae
- Clade: Tracheophytes
- Clade: Angiosperms
- Clade: Monocots
- Clade: Commelinids
- Order: Zingiberales
- Family: Zingiberaceae
- Subfamily: Alpinioideae
- Tribe: Alpinieae
- Genus: Plagiostachys; Ridl.

Type species
- Plagiostachys lateralis Ridl.

= Plagiostachys =

Genus of flowering plants

Plagiostachys is a genus of plants in the Zingiberaceae. It is native to Southeast Asia.

species

- Plagiostachys albiflora Ridl. - Peninsular Malaysia, Sarawak
- Plagiostachys austrosinensis T.L.Wu & S.J.Chen - Guangdong, Guangxi
- Plagiostachys bracteolata R.M.Sm. - Sabah, Sarawak
- Plagiostachys brevicalcarata Julius & A.Takano - Borneo
- Plagiostachys breviramosa Cowley - Borneo
- Plagiostachys corrugata Elmer - Mindanao
- Plagiostachys crocydocalyx (K.Schum.) B.L.Burtt & R.M.Sm. - Sarawak
- Plagiostachys elegans Ridl. - Mindanao
- Plagiostachys escritorii Elmer - Philippines
- Plagiostachys glandulosa S.Sakai & Nagam. - Sarawak
- Plagiostachys lasiophylla Gobilik & A.L.Lamb - Sabah
- Plagiostachys lateralis (Ridl.) Ridl. - Peninsular Malaysia
- Plagiostachys longicaudata Julius & A.Takano - Borneo
- Plagiostachys megacarpa Julius & A.Takano - Borneo
- Plagiostachys mucida Holttum - Peninsular Malaysia
- Plagiostachys nicobarica M.Sabu, Sanoj & Prasanthk. - Nicobar Islands
- Plagiostachys oblanceolata Gobilik & A.L.Lamb - Sabah
- Plagiostachys odorata C.K.Lim - Peninsular Malaysia
- Plagiostachys parva Cowley - Sabah, Brunei
- Plagiostachys parviflora (C.Presl) Ridl. - Philippines
- Plagiostachys philippinensis Ridl. - Philippines
- Plagiostachys rolfei (K.Schum.) Ridl. - Philippines
- Plagiostachys roseiflora Julius & A.Takano - Sabah
- Plagiostachys strobilifera (Baker) Ridl. - Borneo
- Plagiostachys sumatrensis Ridl. - Kepulauan Mentawai
- Plagiostachys uviformis (L.) Loes. in H.G.A.Engler - Ambon
- Plagiostachys viridisepala Julius & A.Takano - Borneo
