= Plagiostachys bracteolata =

Scientific classification
- Kingdom: Plantae
- Clade: Tracheophytes
- Clade: Angiosperms
- Clade: Monocots
- Clade: Commelinids
- Order: Zingiberales
- Family: Zingiberaceae
- Genus: Plagiostachys
- Species: P. bracteolata

Binomial name
- Plagiostachys bracteolata R.M.Sm.

Species of flowering plant

Plagiostachys bracteolata is a monocotyledonous plant species described by Rosemary Margaret Smith. Plagiostachys bracteolata is part of the genus Plagiostachys and the family Zingiberaceae. No subspecies are listed in the Catalog of Life.
