= Linariantha =

Scientific classification
- Kingdom: Plantae
- Clade: Embryophytes
- Clade: Tracheophytes
- Clade: Angiosperms
- Clade: Eudicots
- Clade: Asterids
- Order: Lamiales
- Family: Acanthaceae
- Subfamily: Acanthoideae
- Tribe: Justicieae
- Genus: Linariantha; B.L.Burtt & R.M.Sm. (1965)
- Species: L. bicolor

Binomial name
- Linariantha bicolor authority = B.L.Burtt & R.M.Sm. (1965)

Monotypic genus of flowering plants

Linariantha is a monotypic genus in the plant family Acanthaceae. It was described by Brian Laurence Burtt and Rosemary Margaret Smith in 1965.

The sole species is Linariantha bicolor, also described by Burtt and Smith. It is endemic to Sarawak state of Malaysia on the island of Borneo. No subspecies are listed in the Catalog of Life.
