= Etlingera venusta =

Scientific classification
- Kingdom: Plantae
- Clade: Tracheophytes
- Clade: Angiosperms
- Clade: Monocots
- Clade: Commelinids
- Order: Zingiberales
- Family: Zingiberaceae
- Genus: Etlingera
- Species: E. venusta

Binomial name
- Etlingera venusta (Ridl.) R.M.Sm.

Species of plant

Etlingera venusta is a monocotyledonous plant species first described by Henry Nicholas Ridley, and given its current name by Rosemary Margaret Smith. Etlingera venusta is part of the genus Etlingera and the family Zingiberaceae. No subspecies are listed in the Catalog of Life.
