= Scaphochlamys petiolata =

Scientific classification
- Kingdom: Plantae
- Clade: Tracheophytes
- Clade: Angiosperms
- Clade: Monocots
- Clade: Commelinids
- Order: Zingiberales
- Family: Zingiberaceae
- Genus: Scaphochlamys
- Species: S. petiolata

Binomial name
- Scaphochlamys petiolata (K.Schum.) R.M.Sm.

Species of flowering plant

Scaphochlamys petiolata is a monocotyledonous plant species first described by Karl Moritz Schumann, and given its current name by Rosemary Margaret Smith. Scaphochlamys petiolata is part of the genus Scaphochlamys and the family Zingiberaceae. No subspecies are listed in the Catalog of Life.
