= Etlingera newmanii =

Scientific classification
- Kingdom: Plantae
- Clade: Tracheophytes
- Clade: Angiosperms
- Clade: Monocots
- Clade: Commelinids
- Order: Zingiberales
- Family: Zingiberaceae
- Genus: Etlingera
- Species: E. newmanii

Binomial name
- Etlingera newmanii S.Sakai & Nagam.

Species of plant

Etlingera newmanii is a monocotyledonous plant species described by S. Sakai and Hidetoshi Nagamasu. Etlingera newmanii is part of the genus Etlingera and the family Zingiberaceae. No subspecies are listed in the Catalog of Life.
