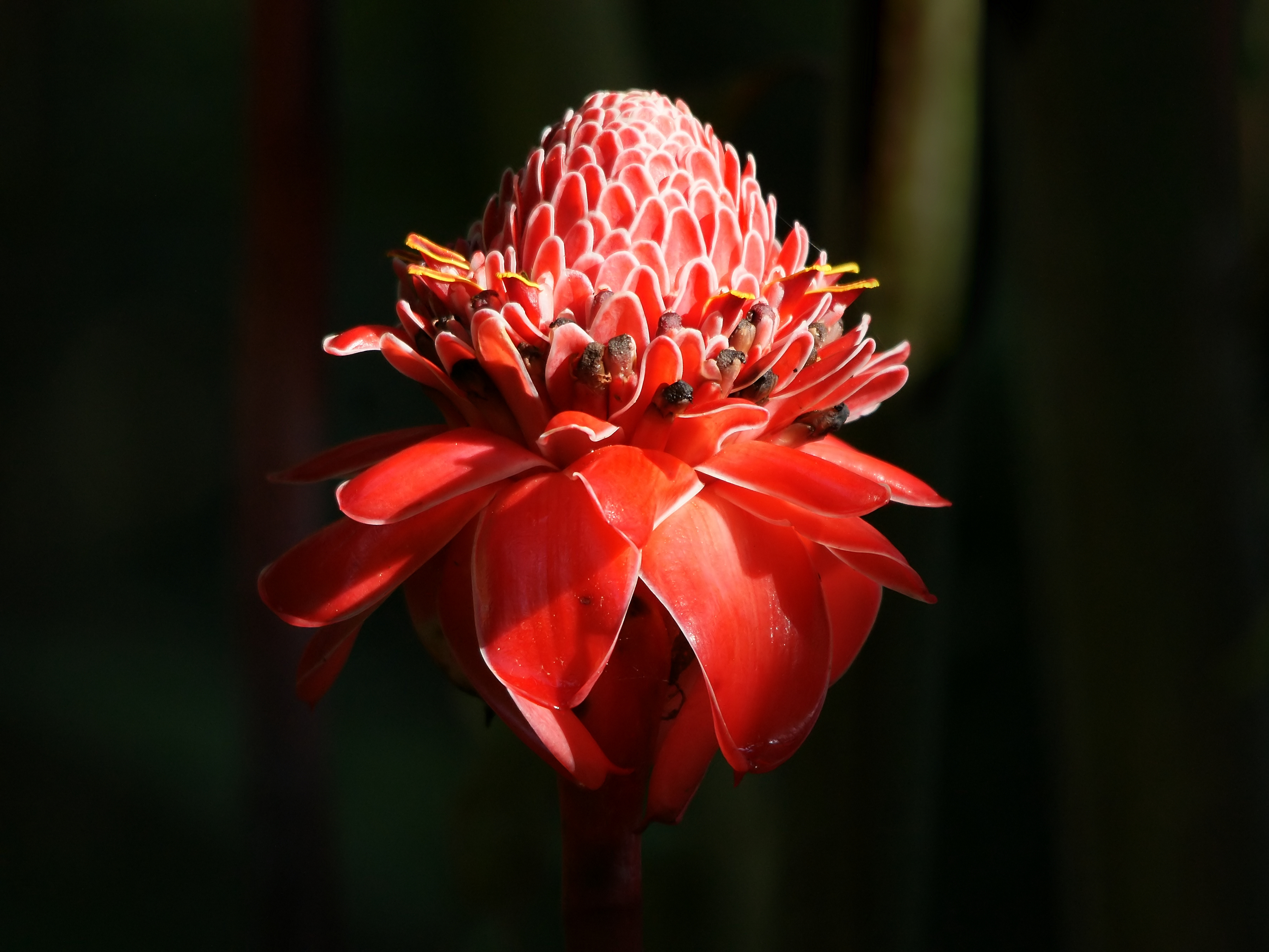
- Etlingera elatior

Scientific classification
- Kingdom: Plantae
- Clade: Tracheophytes
- Clade: Angiosperms
- Clade: Monocots
- Clade: Commelinids
- Order: Zingiberales
- Family: Zingiberaceae
- Subfamily: Alpinioideae
- Tribe: Alpinieae
- Genus: Etlingera; Giseke, 1792

Species
- 100+, see text

Synonyms
- Geanthus Reinw. 1828, illegitimate homonym, not Raf. 1814; Diracodes Blume; Bojeria Raf.; Achasma Griff.; Nicolaia Horan.; Phaeomeria Lindl. ex K.Schum. in H.G.A.Engler

= Etlingera =

Genus of flowering plants in the ginger family Zingiberaceae

Etlingera is a genus of Indo-Pacific herbaceous perennial flowering plants in the ginger family, Zingiberaceae, consisting of more than 100 species found in tropical regions of Afro-Eurasia.

Some of the larger species have leafy shoots reaching almost 10 metres high, and the bases of these shoots are so stout as to seem almost woody. Others of the species grow as clumps of leafy shoots; while others have such long creeping rhizomes that each of their leafy shoots can be more than a metre apart.

Unique and distinctive to all Etlingera is a tube forming above the point where the base of the flowers petals joins onto the plant (i.e. above the insertion of the corolla lobes).

== Distribution ==
Etlingera species are native to India, Bangladesh, Burma, China, Laos, Cambodia, Vietnam, Thailand, Malaysia, Singapore, Indonesia, Philippines, Brunei, Papua New Guinea, Queensland, and several Pacific Islands, predominantly close to the equator between sea level and 2500 metres. Members of the genus are also reportedly naturalized in other warm places (Hawaii, Puerto Rico, Trinidad, Central America, Mauritius, and the islands of the Gulf of Guinea.

== Species ==
The most commonly known species of Etlingera is the torch ginger (E. elatior), also called the torch lily, porcelain rose, or Philippine waxflower because of its showy inflorescence. The described species include:

- Etlingera albolutea
- Etlingera amomoides
- Etlingera angustifolia
- Etlingera apus-hang
- Etlingera araneosa
- Etlingera aurantia
- Etlingera australasica
- Etlingera baculutea
- Etlingera balikpapanensis
- Etlingera baramensis
- Etlingera barioensis
- Etlingera belalongensis
- Etlingera brachychila
- Etlingera brevilabrum
- Etlingera bromeliopsis
- Etlingera burttii
- Etlingera calycina
- Etlingera caudiculata
- Etlingera cevuga
- Etlingera coccinea
- Etlingera corneri
- Etlingera corrugata
- Etlingera crispata
- Etlingera dalican
- Etlingera dekockii
- Etlingera densiuscula
- Etlingera dictyota
- Etlingera diepenhorstii
- Etlingera elatior
- Etlingera facifera
- Etlingera fenzlii
- Etlingera fimbriobracteata
- Etlingera foetens
- Etlingera fulgens
- Etlingera goliathensis
- Etlingera gracilis
- Etlingera grandiflora
- Etlingera grandiligulata
- Etlingera harmandii
- Etlingera heliconiifolia
- Etlingera hemisphaerica
- †Etlingera heyneana
- Etlingera insolita
- Etlingera inundata
- Etlingera isip
- Etlingera kenyalang
- Etlingera labellosa
- Etlingera lacerata Naive sp. nov. (Alpinieae, Zingiberaceae, new ginger species discovered in Mindanao, Philippines)
- Etlingera lagarophylla
- Etlingera latifolia
- Etlingera linguiformis
- Etlingera littoralis
- Etlingera loerzingii
- Etlingera longifolia
- Etlingera longipetala
- Etlingera longipetiolata
- Etlingera loroglossa
- Etlingera maingayi
- Etlingera megalocheilos
- Etlingera metriocheilos
- Etlingera minor
- Etlingera moluccana
- Etlingera muluensis
- Etlingera muriformis
- Etlingera nasuta
- Etlingera newmanii
- Etlingera otiolophos
- Etlingera palangkensis
- Etlingera pandanicarpa
- Etlingera pauciflora
- Etlingera pavieana
- Etlingera peekelii
- Etlingera philippinensis
- Etlingera polyantha
- Etlingera polycarpa
- Etlingera pubescens
- Etlingera punicea
- Etlingera purpurea
- Etlingera pyramidosphaera
- Etlingera rosamariae
- Etlingera rosea
- Etlingera rubromarginata
- Etlingera rubrostriata
- Etlingera sanguinea
- Etlingera sayapensis
- Etlingera sericea
- Etlingera sessilanthera
- Etlingera solaris
- Etlingera sorsogonensis
- Etlingera subterranea
- Etlingera subulicalyx
- Etlingera sulfurea
- Etlingera triorgyalis
- Etlingera walang
- Etlingera valida
- Etlingera velutina
- Etlingera venusta
- Etlingera versteegii
- Etlingera vestita
- Etlingera xanthoparyphe
- Etlingera yunnanensis

== Ethnobotany ==
Species of Etlingera are widely used for many different purposes and many of the species are therefore locally named and known.

A common use is to pull out and eat the inner sheathes of the leafy shoots of some species: to eat either raw, cooked as a vegetable, or as a condiment (much in the same way as onions are used as a condiment). E. coccinea (known as tuhau in Sabah; no English name) and E. elatior (torch ginger) are especially cultivated for this purpose.

The aromatic sweet and sour fruits are also commonly eaten. Several species are used as medicines to treat headaches or stomachaches. One species which itself has large distinctive red patches, (E. brevilabrumin), is commonly applied externally, to relieve itching and other skin problems.

Other uses made of various Etlingera species include ingredients in local perfumes, ingredients in local shampoos, and making mats, etc. In Borneo, a study of 40 species of Etlingera found more than 70% of these species had alternative local names, and more than 60% had at least one use amongst local peoples.
