= Lim Chong Keat =

Malaysian architect and botanist

Lim Chong Keat (Chinese: 林蒼吉; Pe̍h-ōe-jī: Lîm Chhong-kiat; born 1930) is a Malaysian architect and botanist.

He trained at the University of Manchester and the Massachusetts Institute of Technology.

He considers himself to be a comprehensivist and universalist, like his role model Buckminster Fuller. He designed the KOMTAR Tower, in the city of George Town in Penang, Malaysia and Jurong Town Hall in Singapore.

He is a self-taught botanist. He has discovered and named about 40 palms and gingers.

He is the younger brother of Lim Chong Eu.
