= John Donald Mood =

John Donald Mood (November 15, 1945) is a Danish botanist.

As of October 2010, He has more than 44 records of identifications and classifications of new species. He regularly publishes in: Nordic J. Bot .; Novon; Reinwardtia; Fl. Thailand; Dansk Bot. Ark .; Kong. Danske Vidensk. Selsk., Biol. Skr .; Congratulations. Vol. Southeast Asian Stud .; New Plantsman; Notes Roy. Bot. Gard. Edinburgh; Nat. Hist. Bull. Siam Soc .; Biol. Meddel. K. Danske Vidensk. Selsk .; Bot. Tidsskr.

== Publications ==
=== Journals ===
Mood, J, K Larsen.New Curcumas from South-east Asia 2001 New Plantsman, vol. 8, pp. 207-217

=== Books ===
A folk botany of Guam: an ethnobotanical study of the Guamanian-Chamorro 1976, Ed. University of Guam
