= Theodoric Valeton =

Dutch botanist (1855-1929)

- Born: 1855; Groningen
- Died: 1929 (aged 73–74); The Hague
- Education: University of Groningen
- Known for: Studies on Zingiberaceae; his work at Bogor Botanical Garden
- Scientific career
- Fields: Botany
- Workplaces: Bogor Botanical Gardens
- Author abbrev. (botany): Valeton

Theodoric Valeton (1855 in Groningen – 1929 in The Hague) was a Dutch botanist.

He studied at the University of Groningen and received his doctorate in 1886. In 1893, he began working at the botanical garden in Bogor, Indonesia and managed its herbarium between 1903 and 1913. Valeton studied Zingiberaceae in Bogor between 1916 and 1919.

He was honoured in the naming of 2 plant taxa; Valetonia T.Durand (in the Icacinaceae family), which was published in 1888, the name is now a synonym of Pleurisanthes Baill. In 1909, Franz Xaver Rudolf von Höhnel published Valetoniella Höhn., which is a genus of fungi (in the family Niessliaceae).
