= Axel Dalberg Poulsen =

Danish naturalist, botanist, and curator

Axel Dalberg Poulsen (7 April 1961, Holbaek, Denmark) is a Danish botanist, taxonomist and naturalist. His research interests are the flora of Denmark and its surroundings, taxonomy and evolution of gingers in a wide sense (families in the Ginger Order Zingiberales).

Based at the Royal Botanic Garden Edinburgh, Axel specialises in the taxonomy, evolution, and ecology of the Zingiberales, his work integrates traditional field exploration with modern Next Generation Sequencing (NGS) to map the evolutionary history of tropical ground herbs.

Axel has been part of ten collaborative expeditions to Papua New Guinea, his research bridges the gap between vegetation analysis and conservation. His work also facilitates critical IUCN conservation assessments, ensuring the protection of tropical biodiversity through a molecular phylogenetic framework.

== Education and Career ==
In 1993, he obtained a doctorate degree in tropical biology from Aarhus University; defending the thesis "Investigations of herbs in two humid tropical lowlands forests". His supervisor was Dr. Iván Nielsen.

He is a leading expert on the genus Etlingera, and focuses on the ginger family Zingiberaceae.

He is a researcher at the Royal Botanic Garden Edinburgh.

In 2016, as part of the Flora of Nepal Project, at the Royal Botanic Gardens in Edinburgh, he was sponsored to participate in an expedition to collect specimens in eastern Nepal and train the staff of the National Herbarium of Nepal to collect and preserve material from Zingiberales. Support from the Fund Expedition, Peter Davis of the University of Edinburgh to carry out fieldwork in Papua New Guinea as part of the ongoing project "Gingers of Papua New Guinea".
