= Rosemary Margaret Smith =

Scottish botanist and illustrator (1933–2004)

- Born: 1933; Scotland
- Died: 2004 (aged 70–71)
- Occupation: Botanist
- Years active: 1963 – early 2000s
- Known for: Taxonomy of the ginger family; classification of many species of ginger

Rosemary Margaret Smith (1933–2004) was a Scottish botanist and illustrator who specialized in the taxonomy of the Zingiberaceae, or ginger family. Many of the species she classified and identified as being placed into improper genera were found in Asian countries, especially in the isolated island of Borneo.

Elettariopsis smithiae, a species of ginger native to Malaysia and Thailand, is named in honour of her. In 2001, a genus titled Smithatris was named after her, the two species in the genus being Smithatris supraneanae and Smithatris myanmarensis.

== Career ==
The Malay rose was first described by Henry Nicholas Ridley as Hornstedtia venusta, but Smith determined that it should be placed in the genus Etlingera, becoming Etlingera venusta. The genus Paracautleya was among the earliest defined by Smith, though it was later determined by Skornickova and Sabu (2005) that there were not enough physically differentiating traits to consider the monophyletic species separate from the genus Curcuma. Alongside B. L. Burtt in 1986, Smith identified that many of the species that should have been included in the genus Etlingera had been mistakenly put into incorrect genera by researchers in the prior century. Together, they have classified several species unique to Asian countries, including shell ginger. In reviewing the genus Amomum exclusive to Borneo, Smith was responsible for subdividing the large number of species in the genus into five groups. Similarly, she separated the Plagiostachys species in Borneo into two separate groups based on their general physical structure. She was able to identify five species of Scaphochlamys that had been misidentified, with two having been mistakenly placed into the genus Haplochorema.

In 1982, Smith published her research on ginger species at Gunung Mulu National Park in Malaysia. From this investigation, she was able to identify special characteristics of the genus Boesenbergia. While continuing her research in Borneo, Smith's publications in 1987 classified the six key physiological distinctions between the genera Scaphochlamys, Distichochlamys and Boesenbergia. Complications over the division of the genus Alpinia into separate genera were solved as a first step by Smith in 1990 when she created the genus Pleuranthodium and included in it 22 newly renamed species.

From 1963 to 1979 her illustrations were published with the "Plant of the Week" column in The Scotsman with text by Alf Evans.

== Selected publications ==
- ——; Burtt, B. L. (1972). "Tentative keys to the subfamilies, tribes and genera of Zingiberaceae". Edinb Roy Bot Gard Notes: 171–227.
- —— (1985). "A Review of Bornean Zingiberaceae I: (Alpinieae)". Edinb Roy Bot Gard Notes. 42: 261–314.
- —— (1986). "A Review of Bornean Zingiberaceae II: (Alpinieae, concluded)". Edinb Roy Bot Gard Notes. 43: 439–466.
- —— (1987). "A Review of Bornean Zingiberaceae: III (Hedychieae)". Edinb Roy Bot Gard Notes. 44: 203–232.
- —— (1988). "A Review of Bornean Zingiberaceae: IV (Globbeae)". Edinb Roy Bot Gard Notes. 45: 1–19.
- —— (1989). "A Review of Bornean Zingiberaceae V: (Zingibereae)". Edinb Roy Bot Gard Notes. 45: 409–423.
- —— (1991). "Pleuranthodium replaces the illegitimate Psychanthus (Zingiberaceae)". Edinb Roy Bot Gard Notes. 48: 63–68. doi:10.1017/S0960428600003620.

== Classifications ==
* Bolded names were discovered, named, or reclassified by Smith. Only a partial list is included.

- Acanthaceae (Acanthus family)
  - **Linariantha**
    - **Linariantha bicolor**
- Zingiberaceae (Ginger family)
  - Alpinia (Shell ginger genus)
    - **Alpinia beamanii**
    - **Alpinia zerumbet** (Shell ginger)
  - Amomum
    - **Amomum borneense**
    - **Amomum epiphyticum**
  - Elettaria
    - **Elettaria surculosa**
  - Etlingera (Torch ginger genus)
    - **Etlingera brachychila**
    - **Etlingera elatior** (Torch ginger)
    - **Etlingera pauciflora**
    - **Etlingera pubescens**
    - **Etlingera sessilanthera**
  - Hedychium
    - **Hedychium griersonianum**
  - Plagiostachys
    - **Plagiostachys bracteolata**
    - **Plagiostachys crocydocalyx**
  - **Pleuranthodium**
  - Scaphochlamys
    - **Scaphochlamys argentea**
    - **Scaphochlamys petiolata**
    - **Scaphochlamys polyphylla**
    - **Scaphochlamys reticosa**
