= Zingiber matutumense =

Scientific classification
- Kingdom: Plantae
- Clade: Tracheophytes
- Clade: Angiosperms
- Clade: Monocots
- Clade: Commelinids
- Order: Zingiberales
- Family: Zingiberaceae
- Genus: Zingiber
- Species: Z. matutumense

Binomial name
- Zingiber matutumense Mood & Theilade

Species of flowering plant

Zingiber matutumense is a monocotyledonous plant species described by John Donald Mood and Ida Theilade. Zingiber matutumense is part of the genus Zingiber and the family Zingiberaceae.

== Range ==
It is native to the Philippines.
