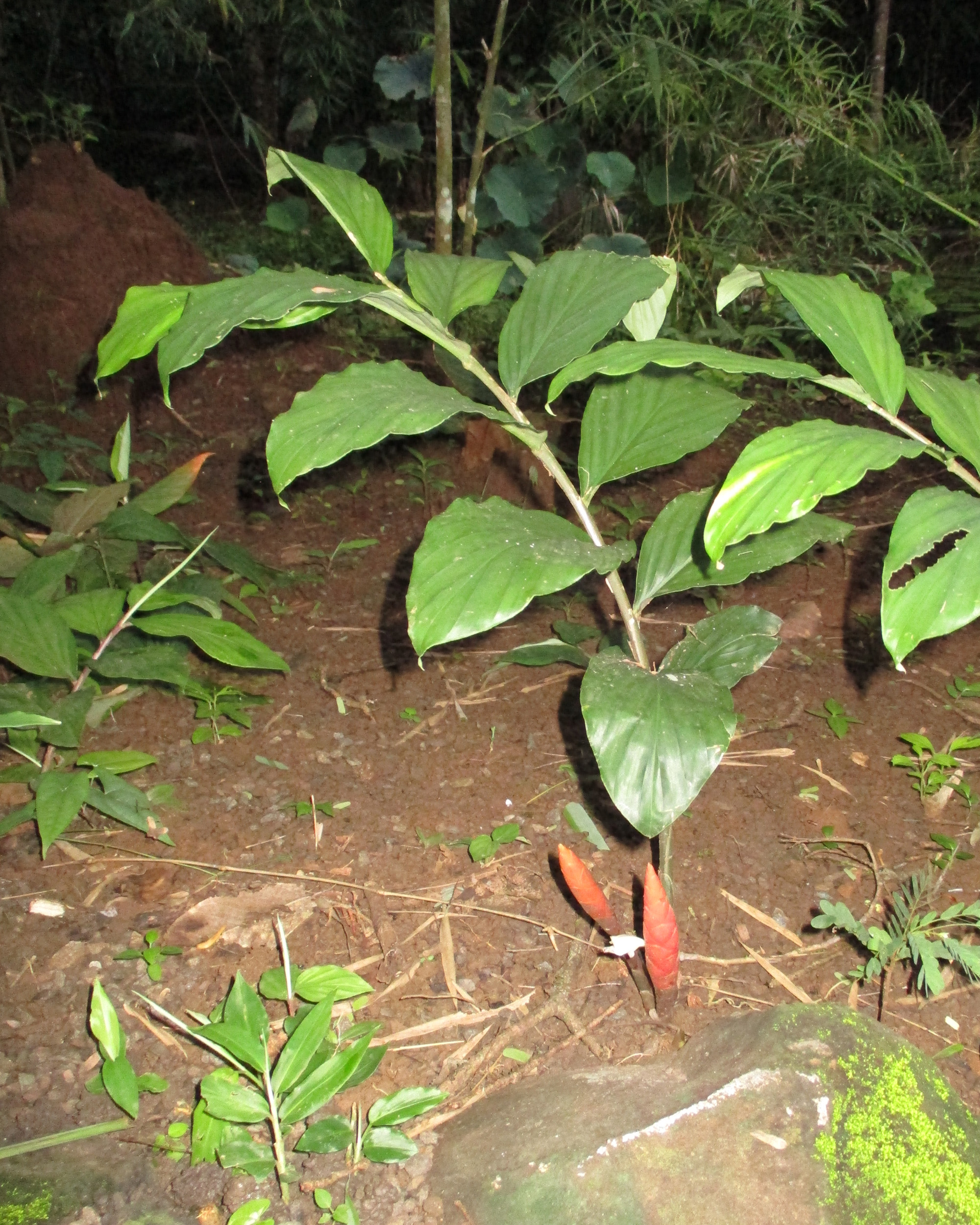
- At Cat Tien National Park

Conservation status
- Vulnerable (IUCN 3.1)

Scientific classification
- Kingdom: Plantae
- Clade: Embryophytes
- Clade: Tracheophytes
- Clade: Spermatophytes
- Clade: Angiosperms
- Clade: Monocots
- Clade: Commelinids
- Order: Zingiberales
- Family: Zingiberaceae
- Genus: Zingiber
- Species: Z. collinsii

Binomial name
- Zingiber collinsii Mood & Theilade, 2000

= Zingiber collinsii =

Species of flowering plant

Zingiber collinsii is a species of ginger plant in the family Zingiberaceae and tribe Zingibereae; it is only found in Vietnam.

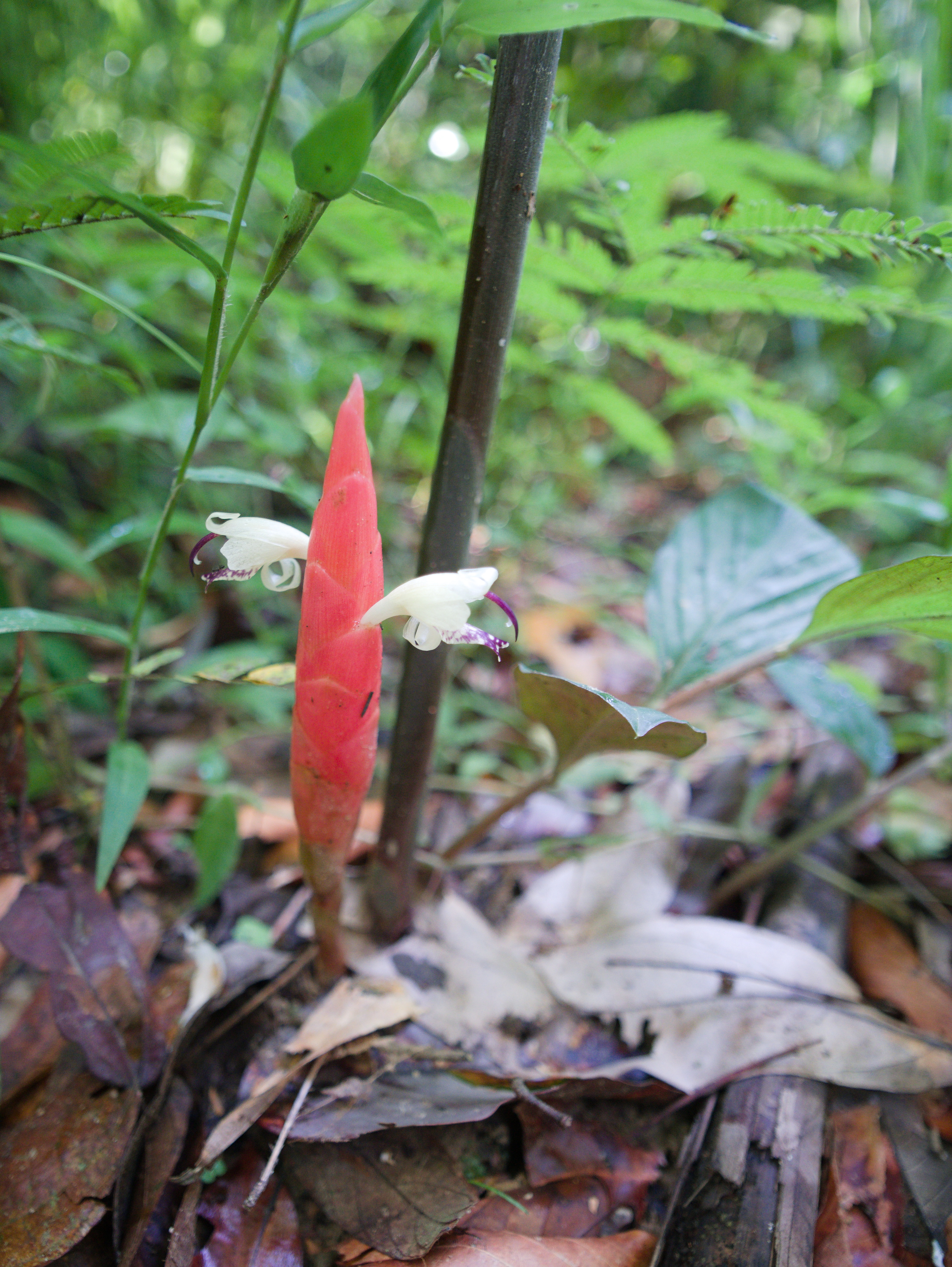
Zingiber collinsii flower in Cat Tien National Park
