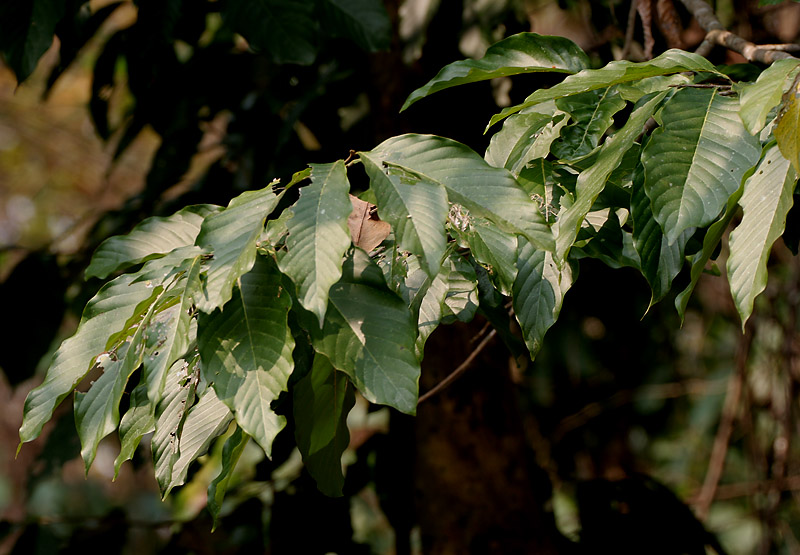
- Dillenia pentagyna leaves

Scientific classification
- Kingdom: Plantae
- Clade: Tracheophytes
- Clade: Angiosperms
- Clade: Eudicots
- Order: Dilleniales
- Family: Dilleniaceae
- Genus: Dillenia
- Species: D. pentagyna

Binomial name
- Dillenia pentagyna Roxb., Pl. Coromandel 1(1): 21, t. 20 (1795)

Synonyms
- Colbertia augusta Wall. ex G.Don; C. coromandelina DC.; Dillenia augusta Roxb.; D. baillonii Pierre ex Laness.; D. floribunda Hook.f. & Thomson; D. hainanensis Merr.; D. minor (Zoll. & Moritzi) Gilg; Wormia augusta (Roxb.) Steud.; W. coromandelina (DC.) Spreng.

= Dillenia pentagyna =

Species of flowering plant

Dillenia pentagyna, the dog teak or Nepali elephant apple, is a small tree with tortuous twigs. It is a member of the family Dilleniaceae, and is found from Sulawesi to South-Central China to India and Sri Lanka.

== Description ==
A tree some 6-15m tall, with tortuous twigs, the bark is grayish and smooth, exfoliating. Branches are glabrous and stout. Leaves are deciduous, petiolate, oblong to obovate-oblong, glabrous, 30–5 cm long, flowers appear before the leaves, 2–7 in number, yellow coloured petals, flowering starts in April–May. Fruit is globose, 0.5 cm in diameter, black ovoid seed, exarillate. On islands of the Mekong in northeastern Cambodia, the tree flowers from February to March, fruits from March to April, and the leaves grow from May to November.

== Vernacular names ==
Common names by which the tree is known include: buku Tetun, Timor; janti, sempu Jawa; l've/lve, chhë muëy rô:y, pheng, rovey, muoy roy sratoap Khmer; 小花五桠果; xiǎo huā wǔ yā guǒ (small-flowered five tree forks fruit) Chinese; ส้านช้าง sanchang, IPA: [saːn tɕʰaːŋ] Thai; korkotta Bengali; akshi Assam; aggai, kallai Hindi; aksikiphal, punnaga Sanskrit; agaai, taatarii, tatri chinnakalinga Nepali; karmal Gujarati and Marathi; rai Oriya; kanigala, kadu-kanigala Kannada; പട്ടിപ്പുന്ന, punna, kodapunna Malayalam; ravudana Telugu; பஞ்சகன்னி உவா, naytekku, kanigalaTamil; dog teak English; dillenia; Nepali elephant apple

== Distribution ==
The tree grows in the following places: Lesser Sunda Islands including Timor, Sulawesi, Jawa, Peninsular Malaysia, Thailand, Vietnam, Cambodia, Laos, Hainan, South-Central China including Yunnan, Andaman and Nicobar Islands, Myanmar, Bangladesh, Assam, East Himalaya, Bhutan, Nepal, India (from Punjab and Gujarat to Assam, Mizoram, Maharashtra, West Bengal and South India), and Sri Lanka.

== Habitat ==
Dillenia pentagyna is found in rainforests, thickets and on hills below 400m. In Cambodia it grows in groups in open/clear forests. In the Pinus latteri-dominated forests of Kirirom National Park, southwestern Cambodia (which occur from 400-1000m elevation), the tree occurs in the 2-8 m high understorey under the 20m high pine canopy. D. pentagyna grows on islands in the Mekong in Steung Treng and Kratie provinces, northeastern Cambodia. It is found in the Deciduous, dipterocarp, seasonal, hardwood forest, dominated by Dipterocarpaceae species, occurring above metamorphic sandstone bedrock, at 25-30m elevation. In Phnom Kulen National Park, Siem Reap Province, northwestern Cambodia, the tree is a common canopy species in the Deciduous Dipterocarp Forest.

== Uses ==
The tree is used as a source of fruit, traditional medicine, timber and charcoal.

Amongst the Tetun speaking practitioners of the ai tahan traditional medicine, in Belu Regency, Timor Barat, Indonesia, the bark is used to treat headaches and migraines.

In Cambodia, the fruit is eaten, but is not generally appreciated, it also provides a component for a remedy against cough. The timber is used to make humidity resistant boards and beams. Small knick-knacks are made from the wood, which makes excellent charcoal as well.

The Bunong people of Mondulkiri Province, northeastern Cambodia, drink a decoction of the bark and wood of both this tree and Oroxylum indicum to treat cold and fever.

Amongst Kuy- and Khmer-speaking people living in the same villages in Stung Treng and Preah Vihear provinces of north-central Cambodia, the tree is used as source of medicine, fuel and food.

In various areas of India, parts of the plant are used in ethnomedicine. The Koch-Rajbanshi people of western Assam use the seed and bark against cancer. In the Konkan region of Maharashtra, village people use a paste of water and bark to treat wounds. In Deogarh district, Tribal people use a decoction of the fruit and Zingiber montanum for "blood dysentery". To treat diabetes, ripe fruit is taken regularly. The unripe fruit is consumed as a vegetable.
