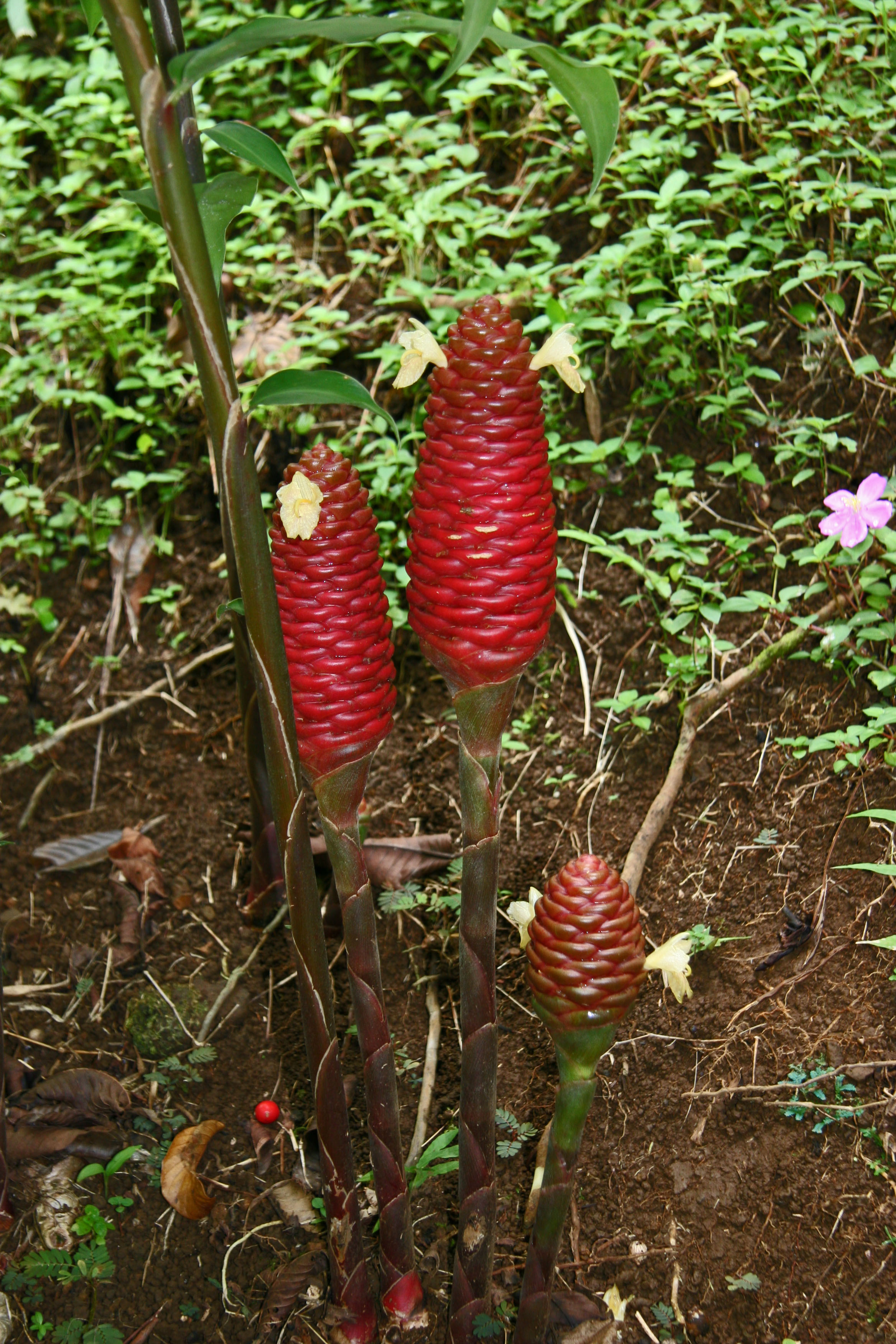
- specimen in Tropical Botanical Garden, Big Island, Hawaii.

Scientific classification
- Kingdom: Plantae
- Clade: Tracheophytes
- Clade: Angiosperms
- Clade: Monocots
- Clade: Commelinids
- Order: Zingiberales
- Family: Zingiberaceae
- Genus: Zingiber
- Species: Z. kelabitianum

Binomial name
- Zingiber kelabitianum Theilade & H Christensen, 1998

= Zingiber kelabitianum =

Species of flowering plant

Zingiber kelabitianum is a species of plant in the family Zingiberaceae, with no subspecies listed in the Catalogue of Life. It was discovered in northern Borneo and described in 1998.
