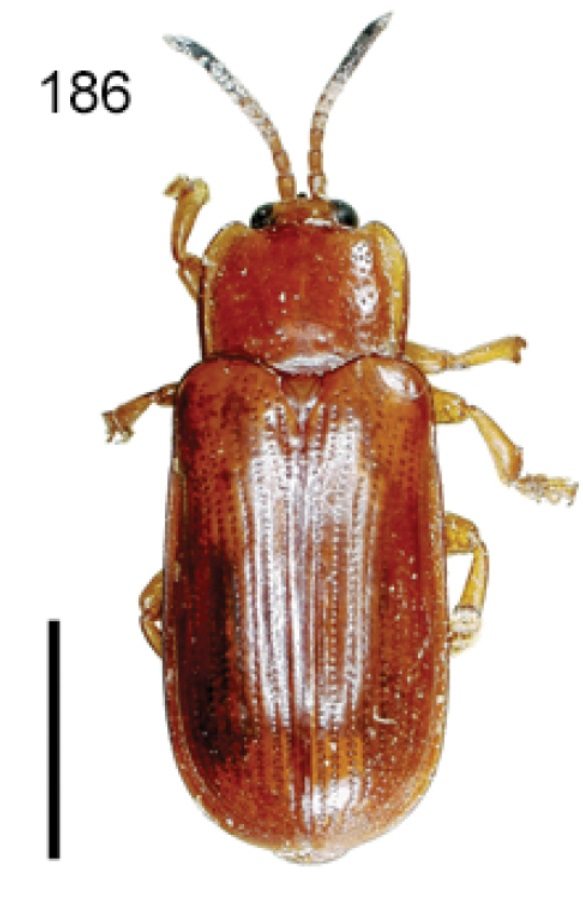

Scientific classification
- Kingdom: Animalia
- Phylum: Arthropoda
- Class: Insecta
- Order: Coleoptera
- Suborder: Polyphaga
- Infraorder: Cucujiformia
- Family: Chrysomelidae
- Genus: Cephaloleia
- Species: C. mauliki

Binomial name
- Cephaloleia mauliki Uhmann, 1930

= Cephaloleia mauliki =

Species of beetle

Cephaloleia mauliki is a species of beetle of the family Chrysomelidae. It is found in Costa Rica and Panama.

== Description ==
Adults reach a length of about 8–8.4 mm. Adults are dark reddish brown, with antennomeres 1–5 and the eyes black.

== Biology ==
The recorded food plants are Heliconia species, Calathea insignis, Renealmia alpinia and Zingiber spectabile.
