= Theilade =

Theilade is a Danish surname. Notable people with this surname include:

- Ida Theilade, Danish botanist
- Nini Theilade (1915–2018), Danish ballet dancer, choreographer and teacher
