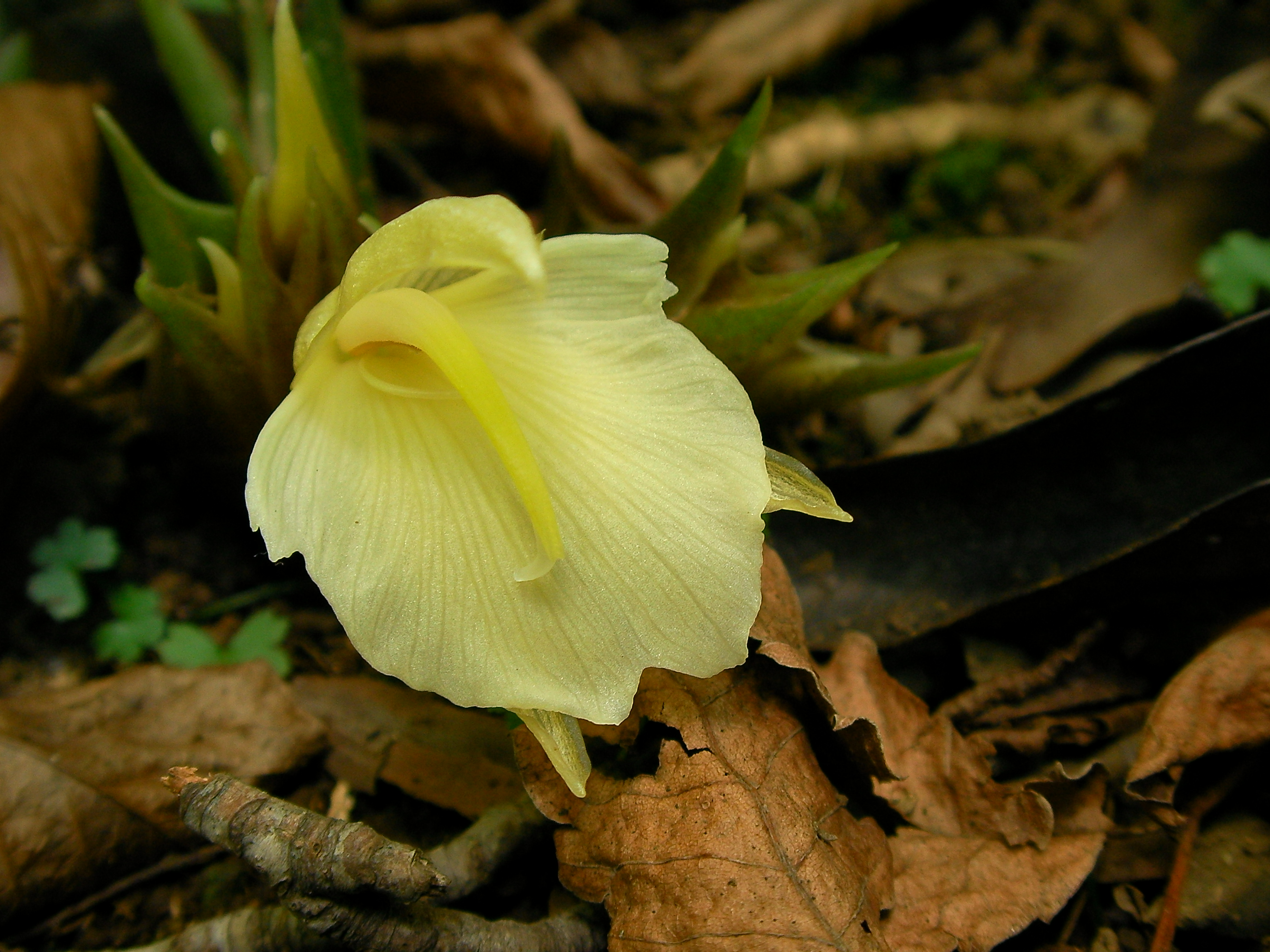

Scientific classification
- Kingdom: Plantae
- Clade: Tracheophytes
- Clade: Angiosperms
- Clade: Monocots
- Clade: Commelinids
- Order: Zingiberales
- Family: Zingiberaceae
- Genus: Zingiber
- Species: Z. mioga

Binomial name
- Zingiber mioga (Thunb.) Roscoe

Synonyms
- Amomum mioga Thunb.; Zingiber mijooka Siebold, spelling variation; Zingiber sjooka Siebold; Zingiber mioga var. variegatum Makino; Zingiber echuanense Y.K.Yang

= Myoga =

Myōga

Species of flowering plant

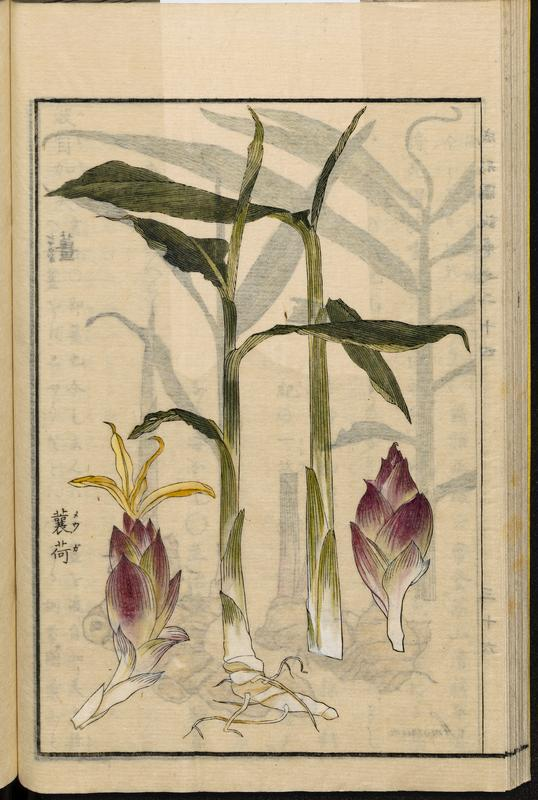
Ginger leaves, illustration from the Japanese agricultural encyclopedia Seikei Zusetsu (1804)

Myoga (茗荷, myōga; also myoga ginger) or Japanese ginger is the species Zingiber mioga in the family Zingiberaceae. It is a deciduous herbaceous perennial native to Japan, China, and the southern part of Korea. Only its edible flower buds and flavorful shoots are used in cooking. The flower buds are finely shredded and used in Japanese cuisine as a garnish for miso soup, sunomono, and dishes such as roasted eggplant. In Korean cuisine, the flower buds are skewered alternately with pieces of meat and then are pan-fried.

== Cultivation ==
A traditional crop in Japan, myoga ginger has been introduced to cultivation in Australia and New Zealand for export to the Japanese market.

As a woodland plant, myoga has specific shade requirements for its growth. It is frost-tolerant to −16 °C (3 °F), and possibly colder.

Three variegated cultivars are known: 'Dancing Crane', 'Silver Arrow' and 'White Feather'. They are less cold-hardy than unvariegated plants.

== Research ==
Myoga has been studied for its anti-inflamatory properties.

== Gallery ==
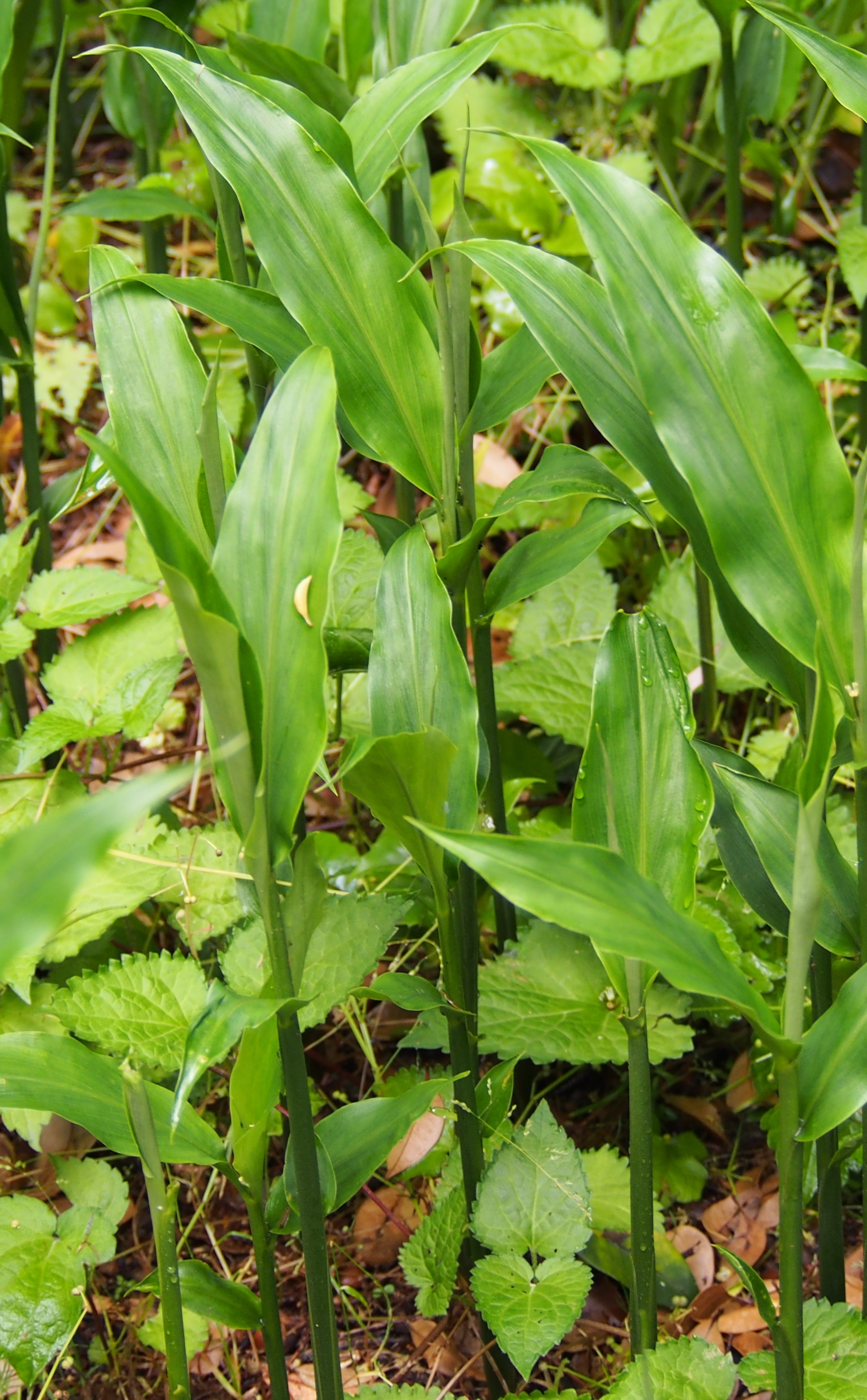
Plants

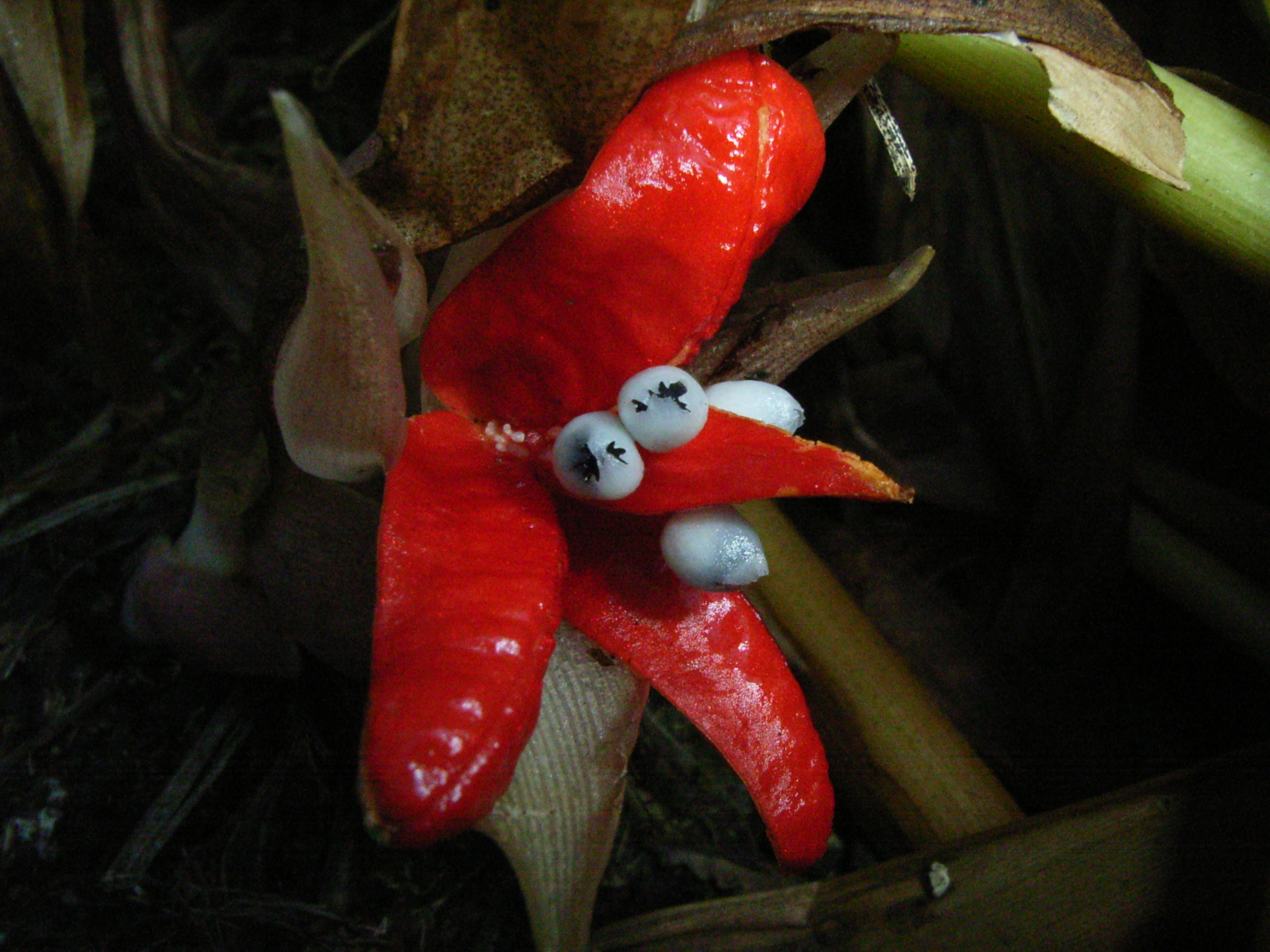
Fruits with red interiors and black seeds with a whitish aril

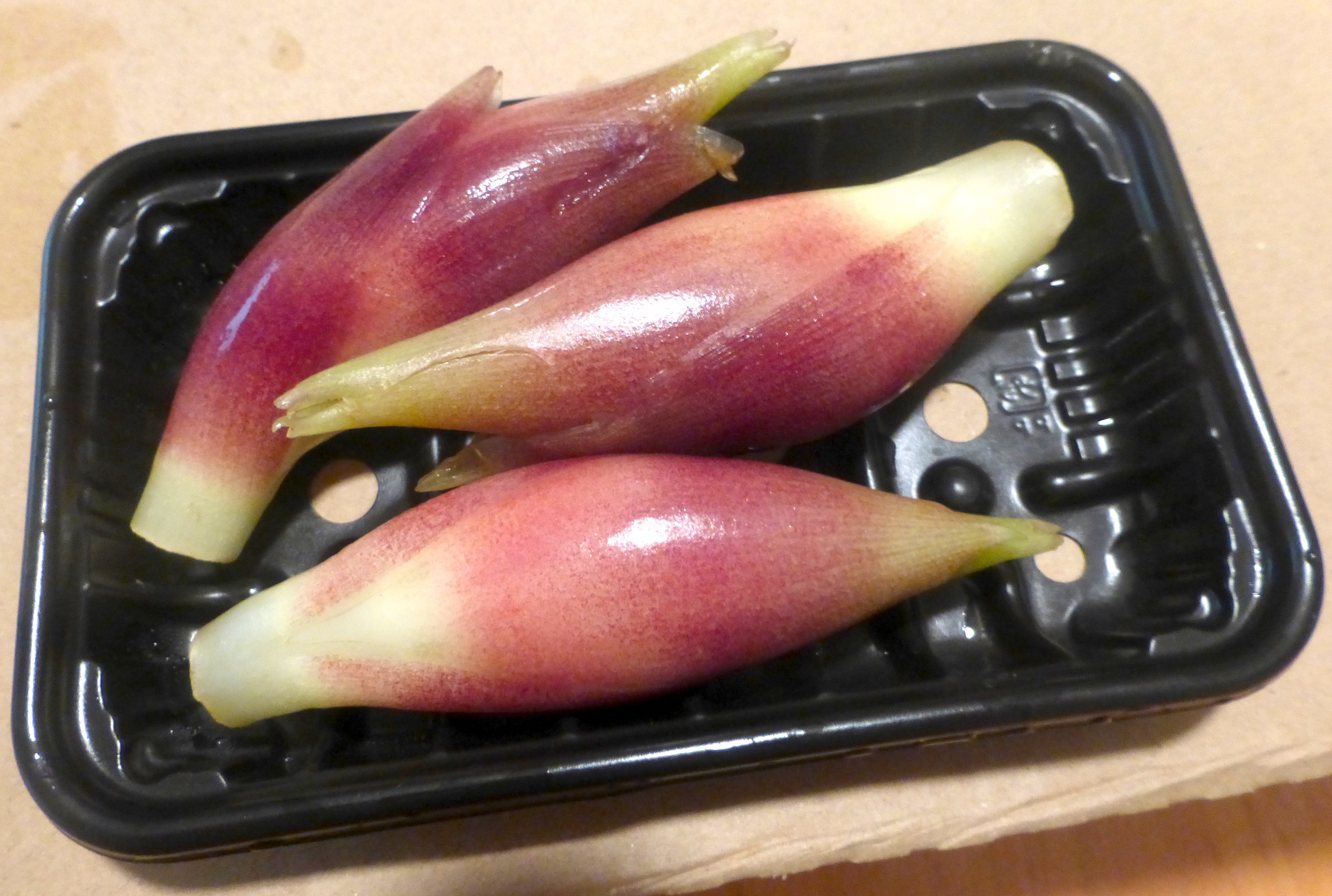
Buds prepared for sale
