= Zingiber sabuanum =

Scientific classification
- Kingdom: Plantae
- Clade: Tracheophytes
- Clade: Angiosperms
- Clade: Monocots
- Clade: Commelinids
- Order: Zingiberales
- Family: Zingiberaceae
- Genus: Zingiber
- Species: Z. sabuanum

Binomial name
- Zingiber sabuanum K.M.P.Kumar & A.Joe

Species of flowering plant

Zingiber sabuanum is a species of the ginger family that is endemic to Western Ghats in India.
