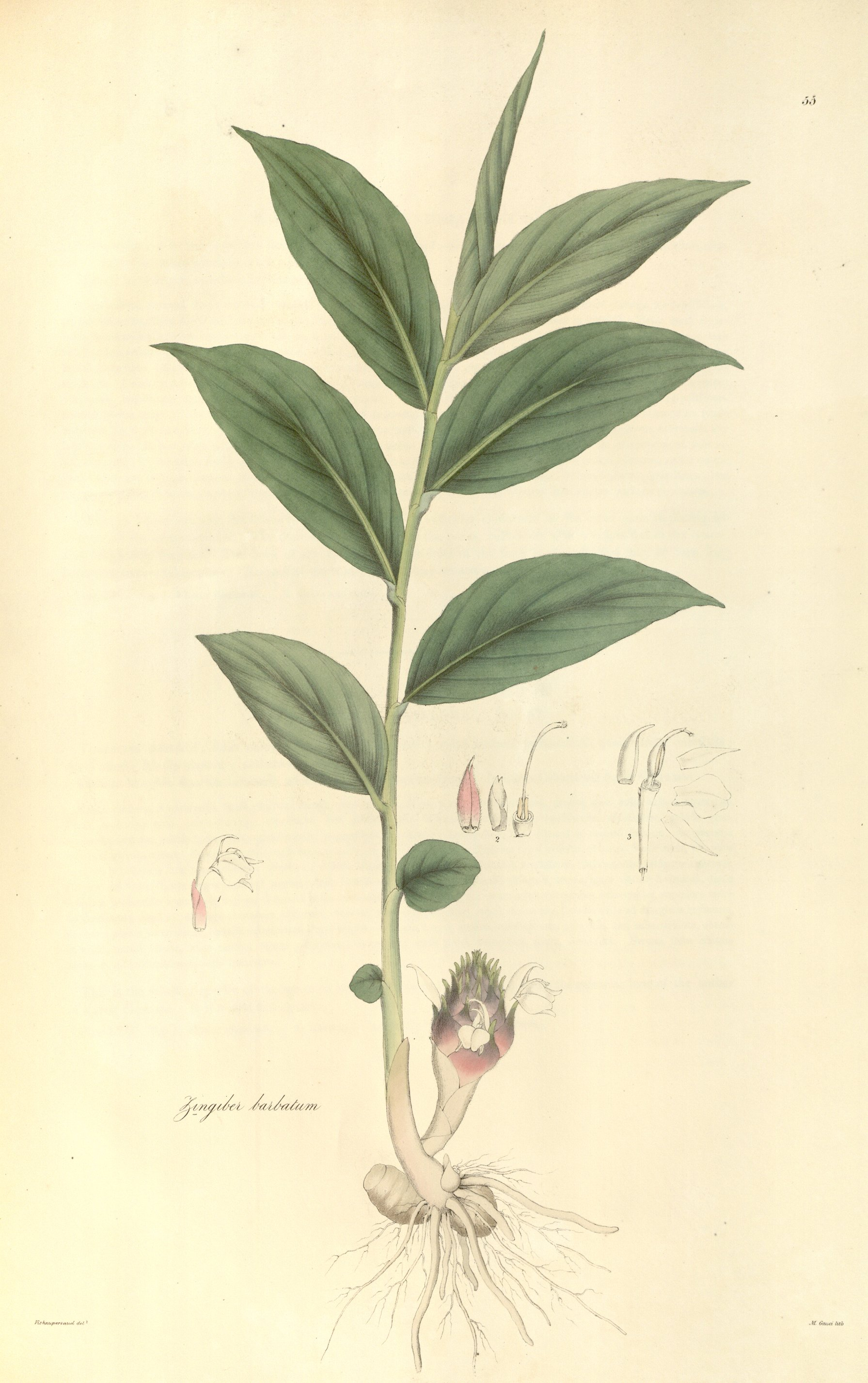
- Adumbration by Nathaniel Wallich

Scientific classification
- Kingdom: Plantae
- Clade: Tracheophytes
- Clade: Angiosperms
- Clade: Monocots
- Clade: Commelinids
- Order: Zingiberales
- Family: Zingiberaceae
- Genus: Zingiber
- Species: Z. barbatum

Binomial name
- Zingiber barbatum (Wall.)

= Zingiber barbatum =

Species of flowering plant

Zingiber barbatum (meik-thalin or meik tha-lin) is a medicinal, therapeutic ginger found in Myanmar. The plant, a rhizome geophyte, is concentrated primarily in the Yangon, Bago, and Mandalay regions, although specimens have been found in at least two other administrative regions.

Researchers from the University of Tsukuba, Padjadjaran University, and Khyber Pakhtunkhwa Agricultural University consider the plant to be an "underutilized [sic] medicinal plant", being "used in the indigenous system of medicine". Having collated 19 specimens from five of Myanmar's administrative subdivisions, the botanists denoted 29 morphological characteristics, pertaining to growth habits, leaf, pseudo-stem, and rhizome characteristics. Of the 29, 22 displayed a high degree of variation within wild ginger specimens, and 20 "contributed significantly" to morphological variation. Eleven amplified primer sets gave a total of 175 bands and exhibited 92.15% polymorphism across intraspecies specimens.

In Nathaniel Wallich's 1830 compendium Plantae Asiaticae Rariores: or, Descriptions and figures of a select number of unpublished East Indian plants, he describes Z. barbatum in nuanced detail:

[This] species approaches nearest to Zingiber squarrosum of William Roxburgh, which I found abundantly about Rangoon, but differs in having [much] broader, convex and ventricose bracts, ending in a very long cylindric point. It grows on the hills near the banks of the Irrawaddy, about Prome, on both sides of that river, where I saw it with unripe fruit [in] September. The plants which were introduced thence into the Calcutta Garden, blossom freely during the cold and rainy seasons. The spikes issue from the creeping roots, near the stems, or from the base of the latter, and are barely elevated above the surface of the earth; they are sometimes compound, that is, a spikelet is produced from one or two of the lowermost bracts. The whole plant possesses a very faint, though pleasant aromatic smell and taste.
