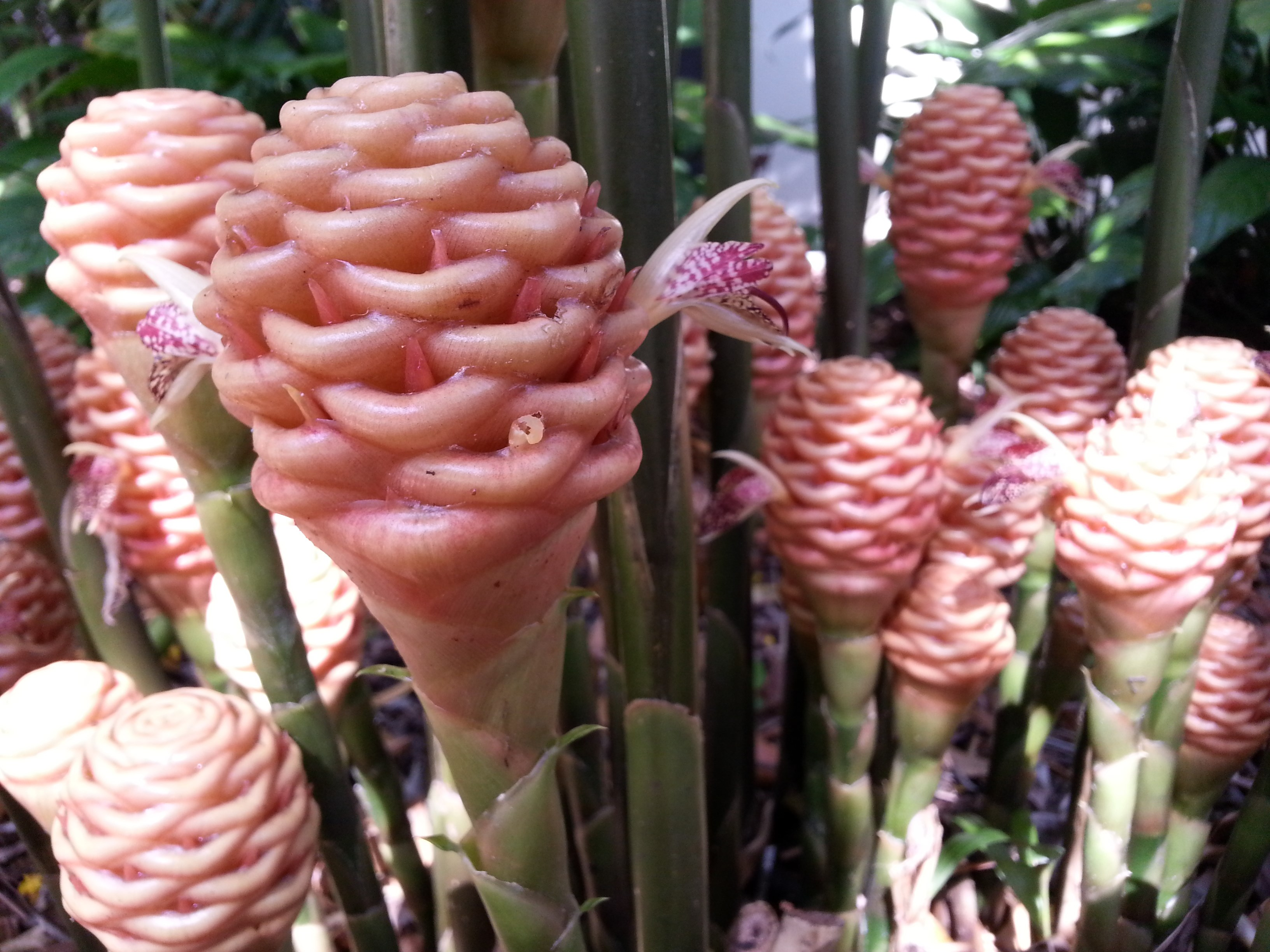

Scientific classification
- Kingdom: Plantae
- Clade: Tracheophytes
- Clade: Angiosperms
- Clade: Monocots
- Clade: Commelinids
- Order: Zingiberales
- Family: Zingiberaceae
- Genus: Zingiber
- Species: Z. spectabile

Binomial name
- Zingiber spectabile Griff.

= Zingiber spectabile =

Species of ginger

Zingiber spectabile is a species of true ginger, native to Maritime Southeast Asia. It is primarily grown in the West as an ornamental plant, although it has been used in South-East Asia as a medicinal herb.

== Name ==
The scientific name of the species is Zingiber spectabile. "Zingiber" is originally from a Sanskrit word that means "shaped like a horn" and refers to the horn-shaped leaves of most species of ginger. "Spectabile" is derived from the Latin spectabilis, meaning 'visible' or 'spectacular'.

The plant is commonly known in the West by the common name "beehive ginger", due to its unusual inflorescences which resemble a skep beehive. It is also referred to by the common names "Ginger wort" or "Malaysian ginger".

== Description ==
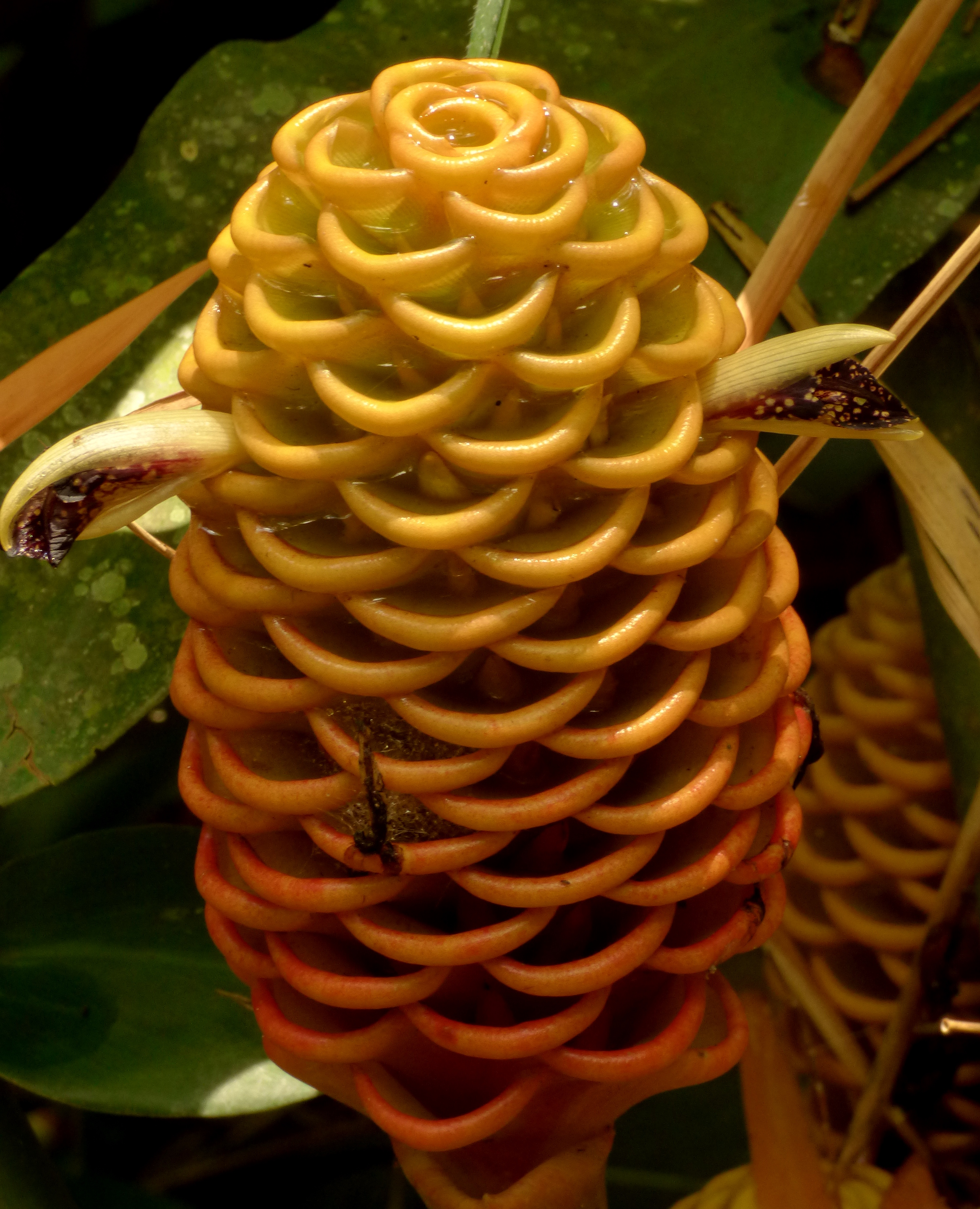
Zingiber spectabile

In common with most plants in genus Zingiber, the leaves of the plant are long and mostly oblong shaped, tapering to a single point at their tip. Under ideal circumstances, the plant can reach a height of 4.5 metres (15 ft), or even more.

The plant's inflorescence is set atop a spike and can measure up to 30 centimetres (12 in) in height. The bracts attached to the structure can differ in colour, from white, to yellow, orange, or even red, often darkening as the bracts mature and develop. The flowers themselves are small, with purple petals and yellow spots, and a fragile, papery texture.

== Uses ==
In Indonesia, the plant has been used in traditional medicine to treat inflammation of the eyes. It is prepared for use by pounding the leaves of the plant into a thick paste, and then topically applying it to the required part of the body. It has also been recorded being used to treat burns, as a treatment for headaches and back pain, and as an agent for food preservation.

Academic research has found that the plant has antimicrobial properties, and significant concentrations of the Zerumbone synthase enzyme, which may be effective in treating colon cancer.
