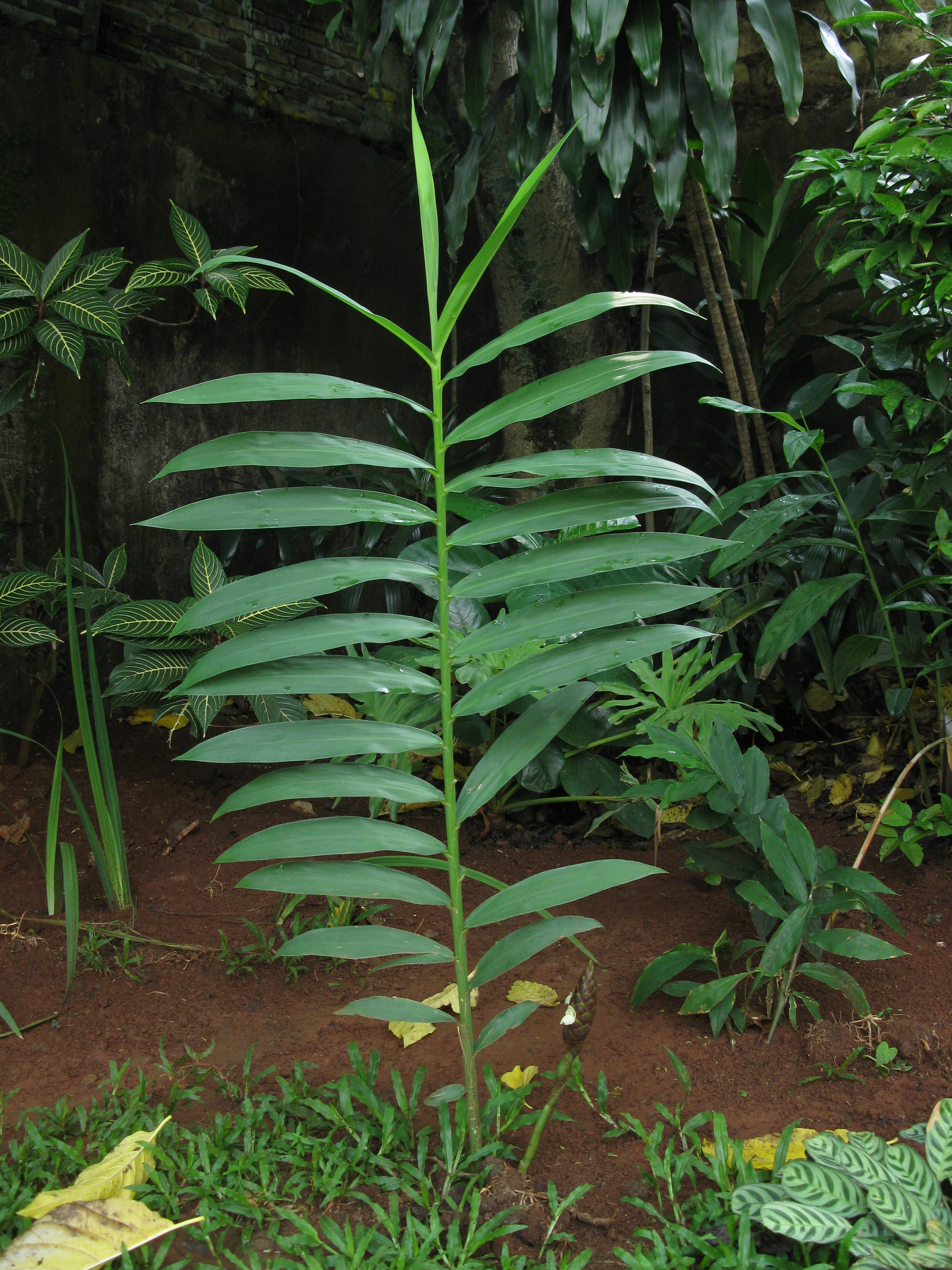

Scientific classification
- Kingdom: Plantae
- Clade: Tracheophytes
- Clade: Angiosperms
- Clade: Monocots
- Clade: Commelinids
- Order: Zingiberales
- Family: Zingiberaceae
- Subfamily: Zingiberoideae
- Tribe: Zingibereae
- Genus: Zingiber
- Species: Z. montanum

Binomial name
- Zingiber montanum (J.König) Link ex A.Dietr., 1831

Synonyms
- Zingiber xantorrhizon Steud. Zingiber purpureum palamauense Zingiber purpureum Roscoe; Zingiber luridum Salisb. Zingiber cliffordiae Andrews; Zingiber cassumunar subglabrum Zingiber cassumunar palamauense Zingiber cassumunar Roxb. Zingiber anthorrhiza Horan. Jaegera montana (J.König) Giseke; Cassumunar roxburghii Colla; Amomum xanthorhiza Roxb. ex Steud. Amomum montanum J.König; Amomum cassumunar (Roxb.) Donn

= Zingiber montanum =

Species of flowering plant

Zingiber montanum is a species of plant in the family Zingiberaceae, with no subspecies. Native to Indo-China and Malesia, it has become an invasive species in the Caribbean and South America; there are many synonyms including Zingiber cassumunar.

== Gallery ==
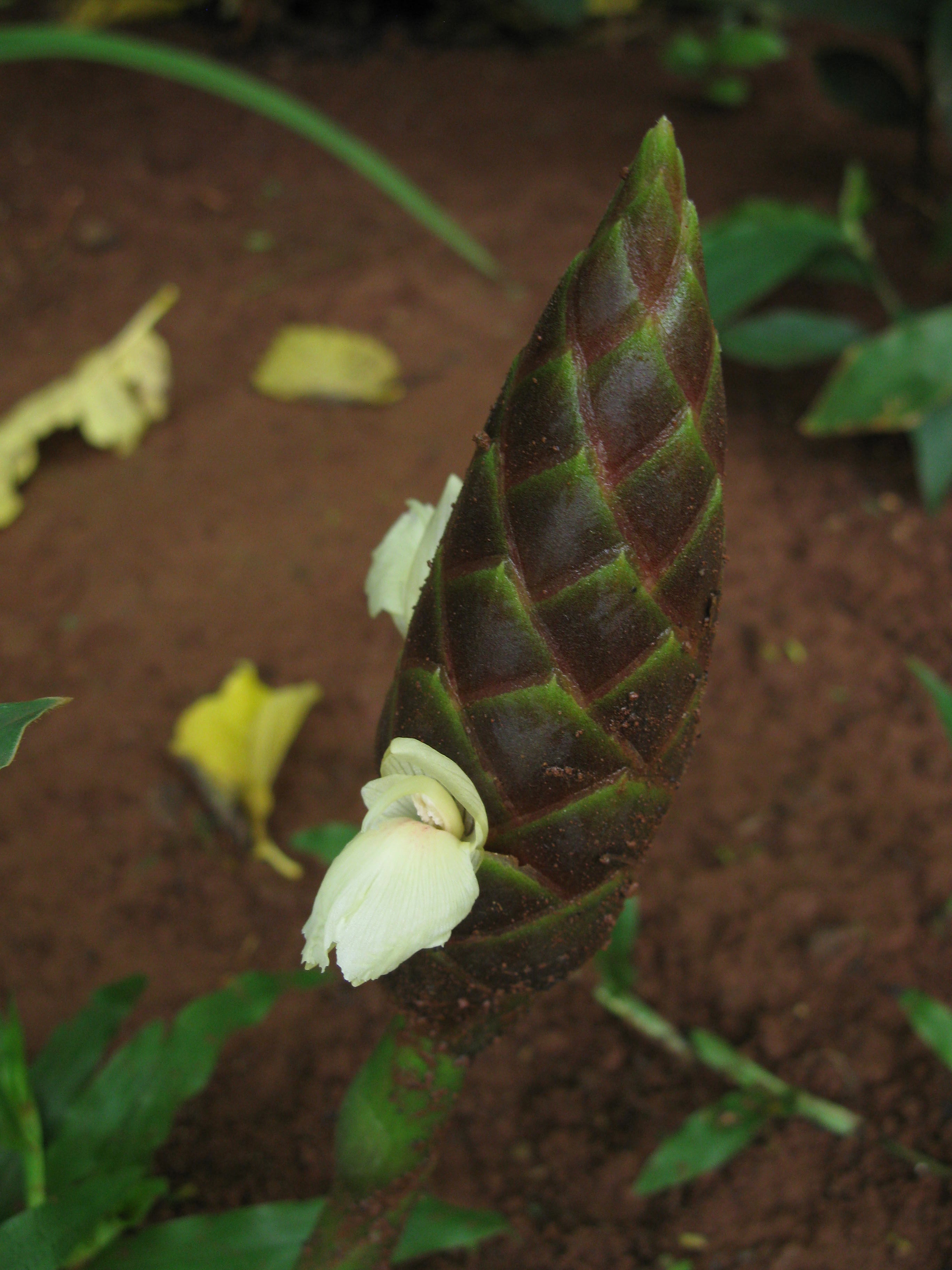

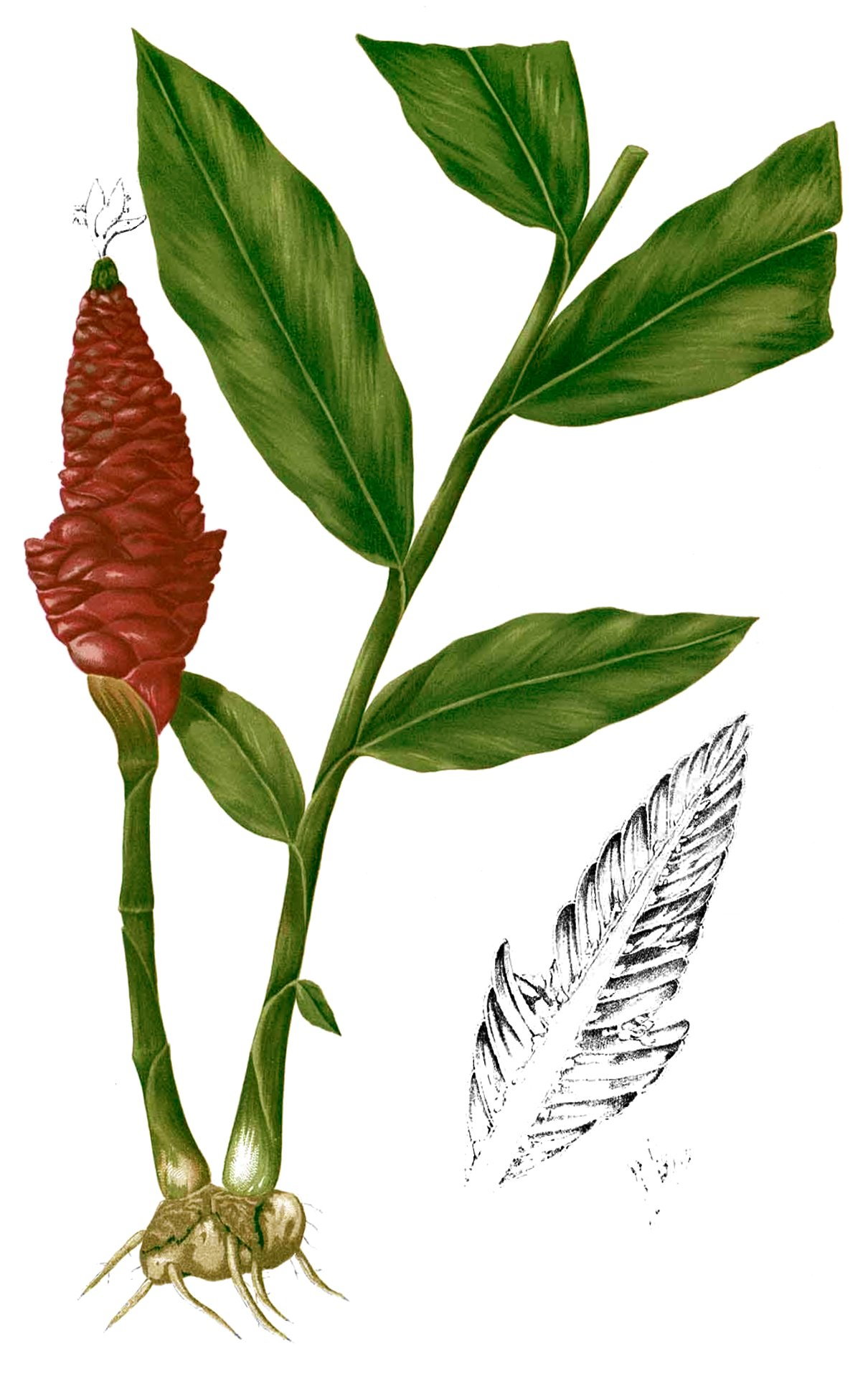

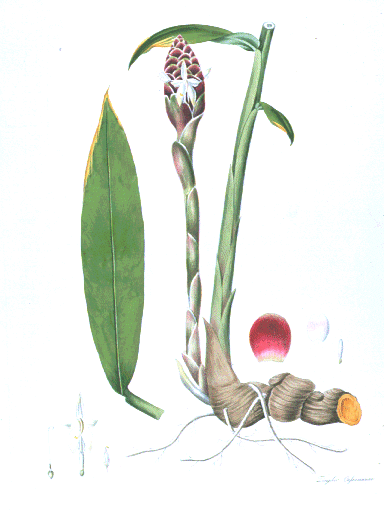
"Z. cassumunar" by W. Roscoe
