= Zerumbone synthase =

Identifiers
- EC no.: 1.1.1.326

Databases
- IntEnz: IntEnz view
- BRENDA: BRENDA entry
- ExPASy: NiceZyme view
- KEGG: KEGG entry
- MetaCyc: metabolic pathway
- PRIAM: profile
- PDB structures: RCSB PDB PDBe PDBsum
Search
- PMC: articles
- PubMed: articles
- NCBI: proteins

Zerumbone synthase (EC 1.1.1.326, ZSD1) is an enzyme with systematic name 10-hydroxy-alpha-humulene:NAD^{+} oxidoreductase. This enzyme catalyses the following chemical reaction:

zerumbol
+ NAD^{+}
H^{+}
H^{+}
zerumbone
+ NADH

The enzyme was cloned from shampoo ginger, Zingiber zerumbet.
