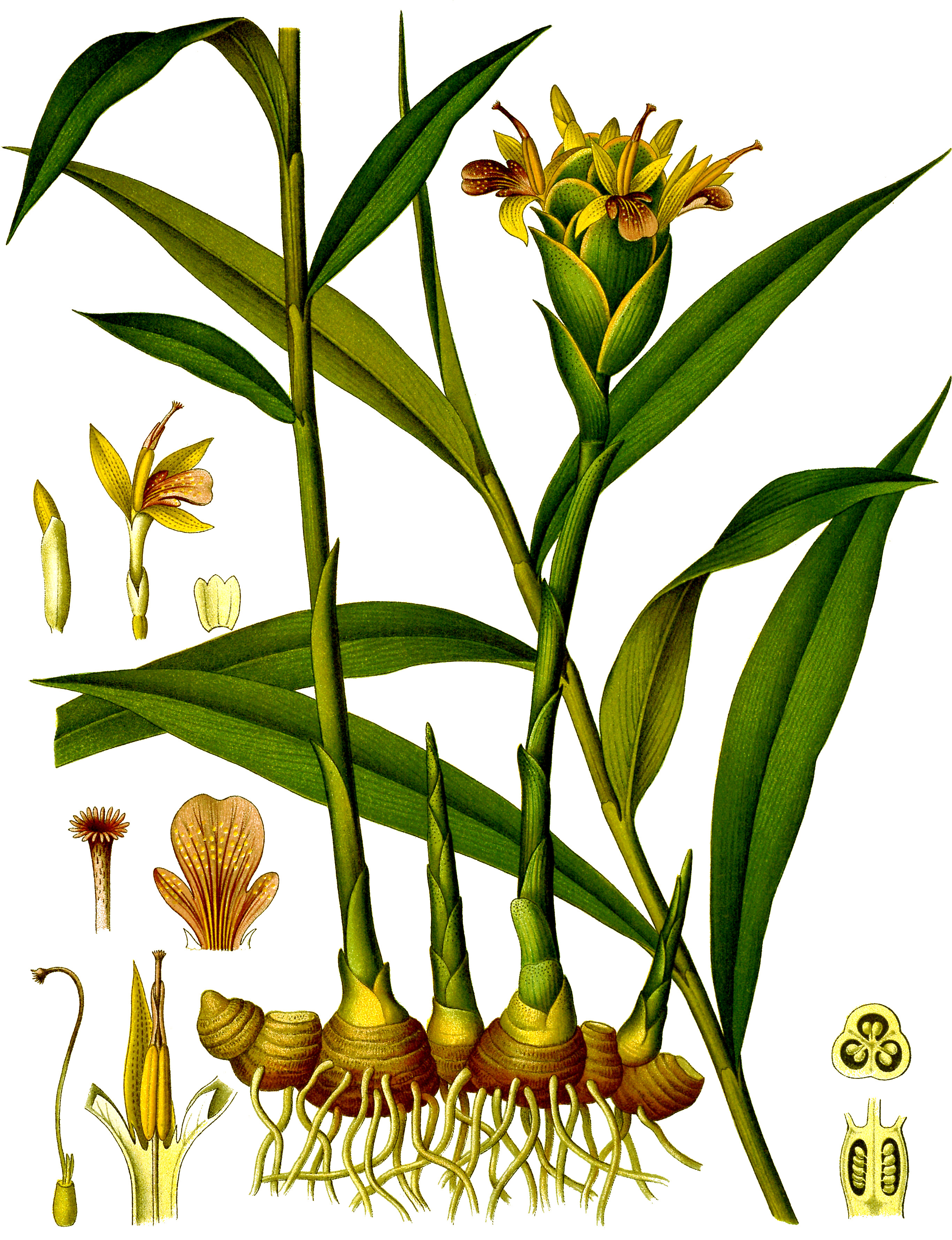
- Zingiber officinale 1896 illustration

Scientific classification
- Kingdom: Plantae
- Clade: Tracheophytes
- Clade: Angiosperms
- Clade: Monocots
- Clade: Commelinids
- Order: Zingiberales
- Family: Zingiberaceae
- Subfamily: Zingiberoideae
- Tribe: Zingibereae
- Genus: Zingiber; Mill., 1754

Synonyms
- Amomum L., rejected name; Pacoseroca Adans.; Thumung J.Koenig in A.J.Retzius; Dieterichia Giseke; Jaegera Giseke; Cassumunar Colla; Zerumbet T.Lestib. 1841, illegitimate homonym, not Garsault 1764 nor J.C. Wendl. 1798; Dymczewiczia Horan.

= Zingiber =

Genus of flowering plants

Zingiber is a genus of flowering plants in the family Zingiberaceae. It is native to China, the Indian subcontinent, New Guinea, and Southeast Asia, especially Thailand. It contains the true gingers, plants grown the world over for their culinary value. The most well known species are Z. officinale and Z. mioga, two garden gingers. The genus name comes from Latin borrowing the Tamil name for the first species.

== Culinary ==
Each ginger species has a different culinary usage; for example, myoga is valued for the stem and flowers. Garden ginger's rhizome is the classic spice "ginger", and may be used whole, candied (known commonly as crystallized ginger), or dried and powdered. Other popular gingers used in cooking include cardamom and turmeric, though neither of these examples is a "true ginger" – they belong to different genera in the family Zingiberaceae.

== Species ==
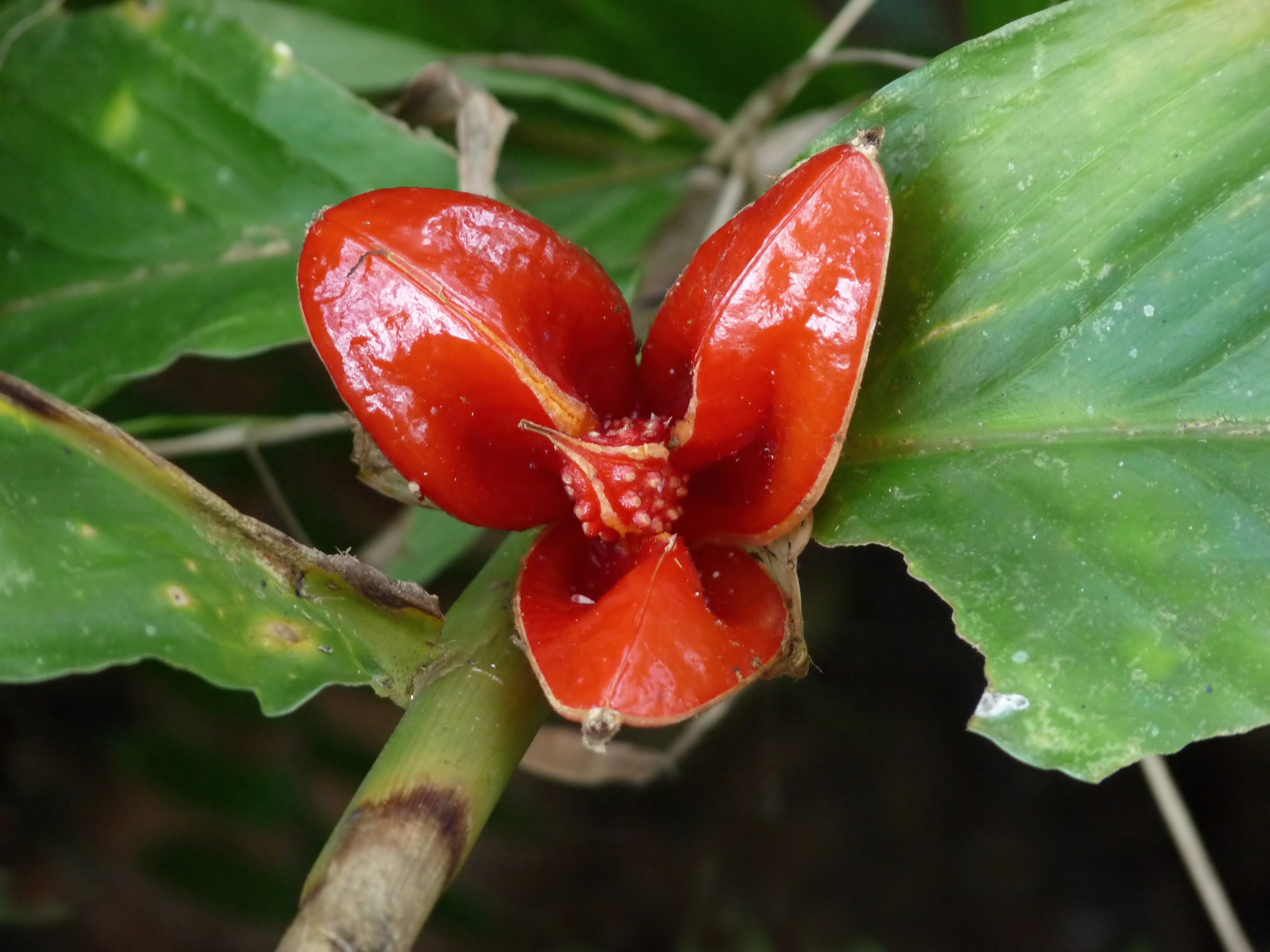
Zingiber cernuum

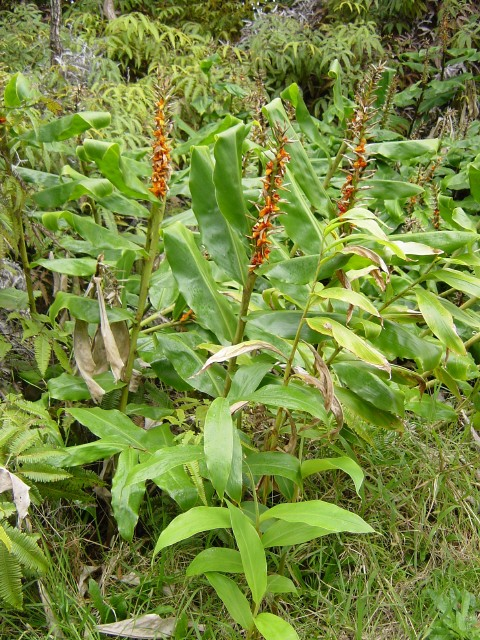
Zingiber officinale

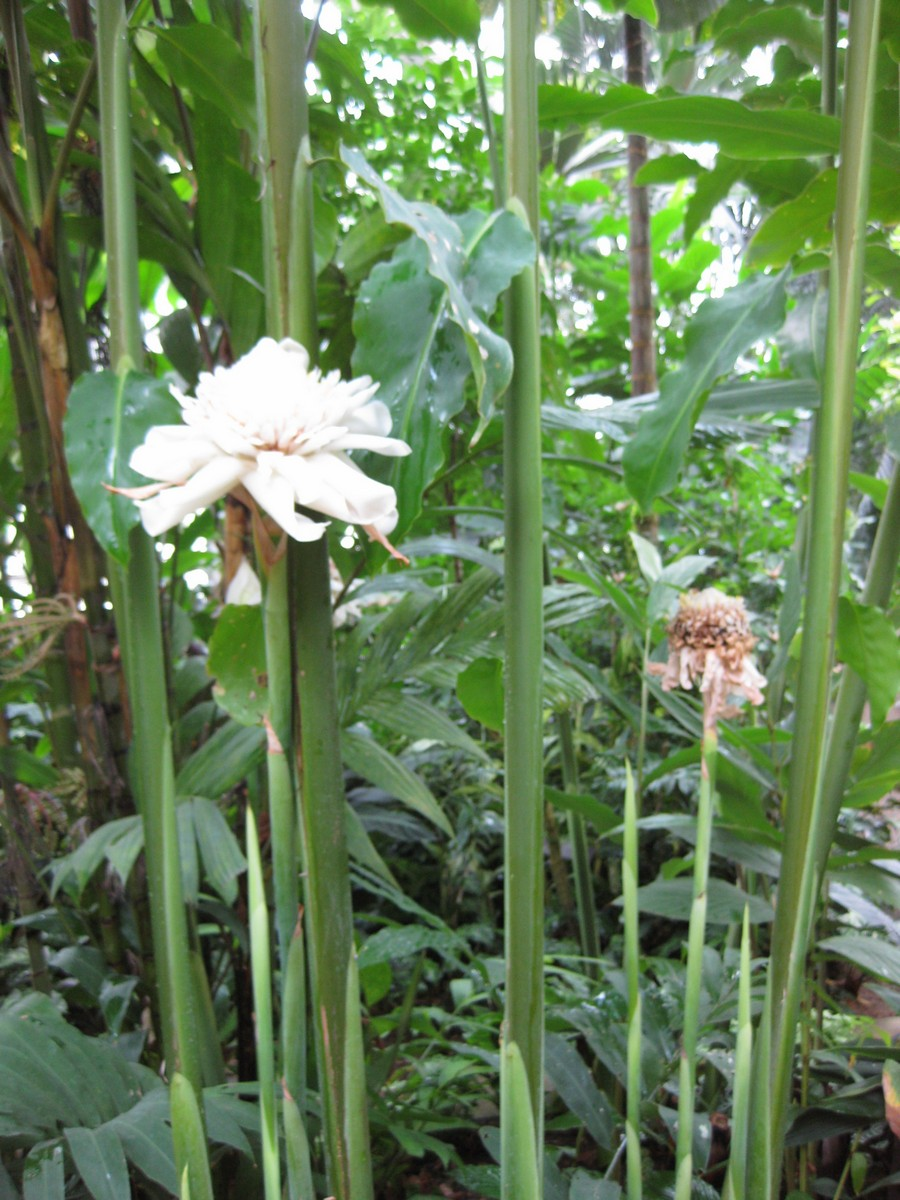
Zingiber ottensii

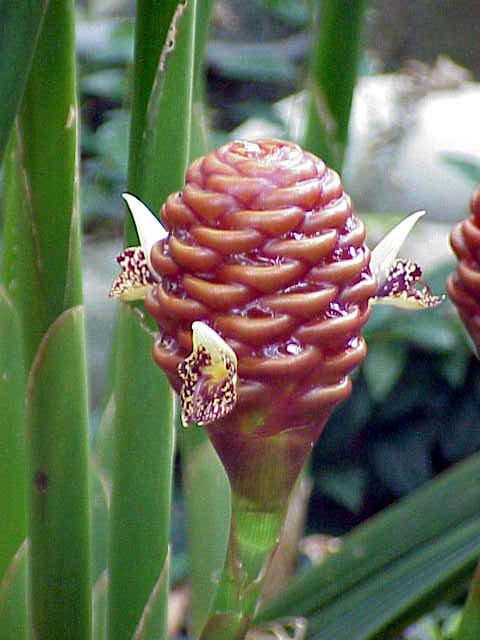
Zingiber macradenium

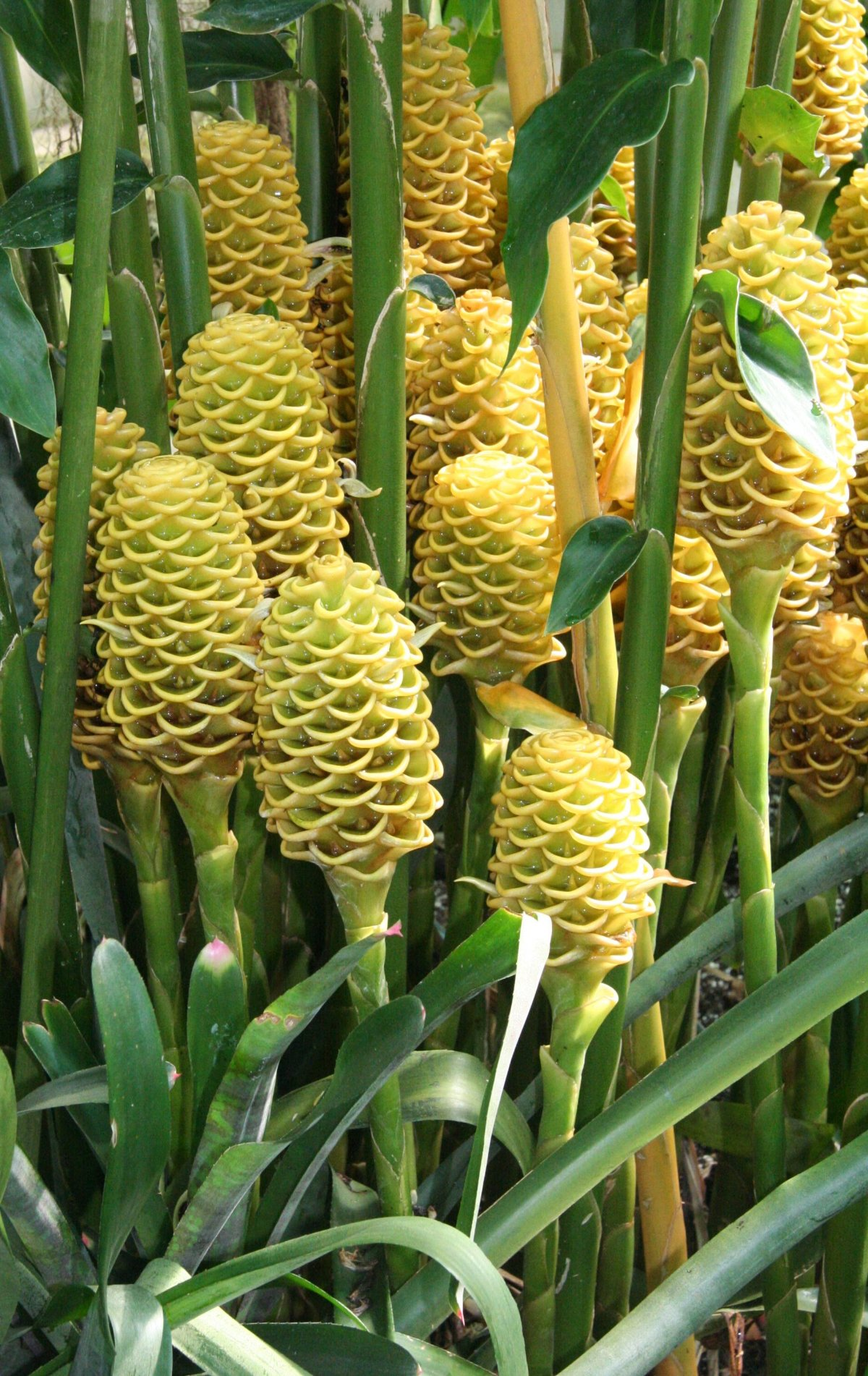
Zingiber spectabile

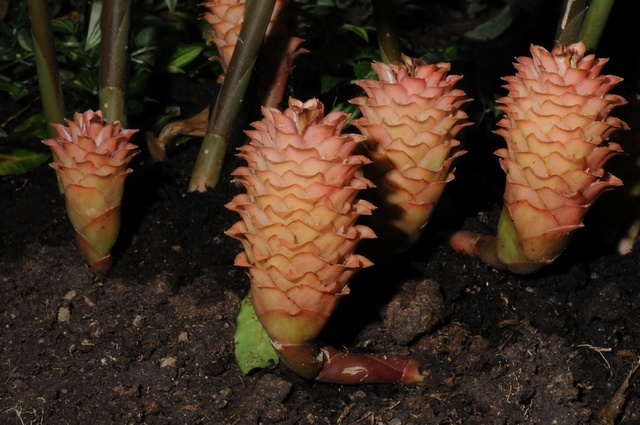
Zingiber wrayi

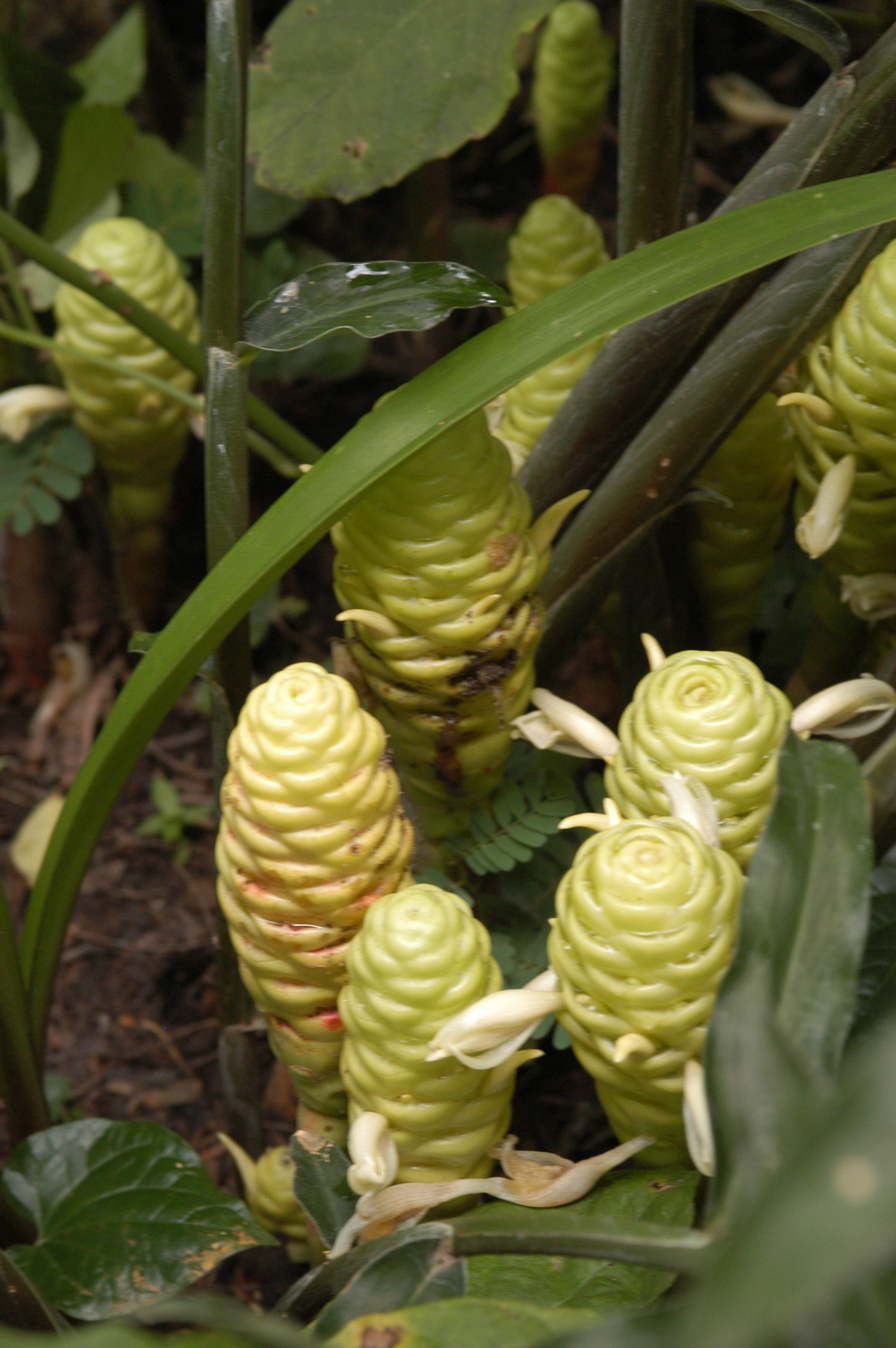
Zingiber zerumbet

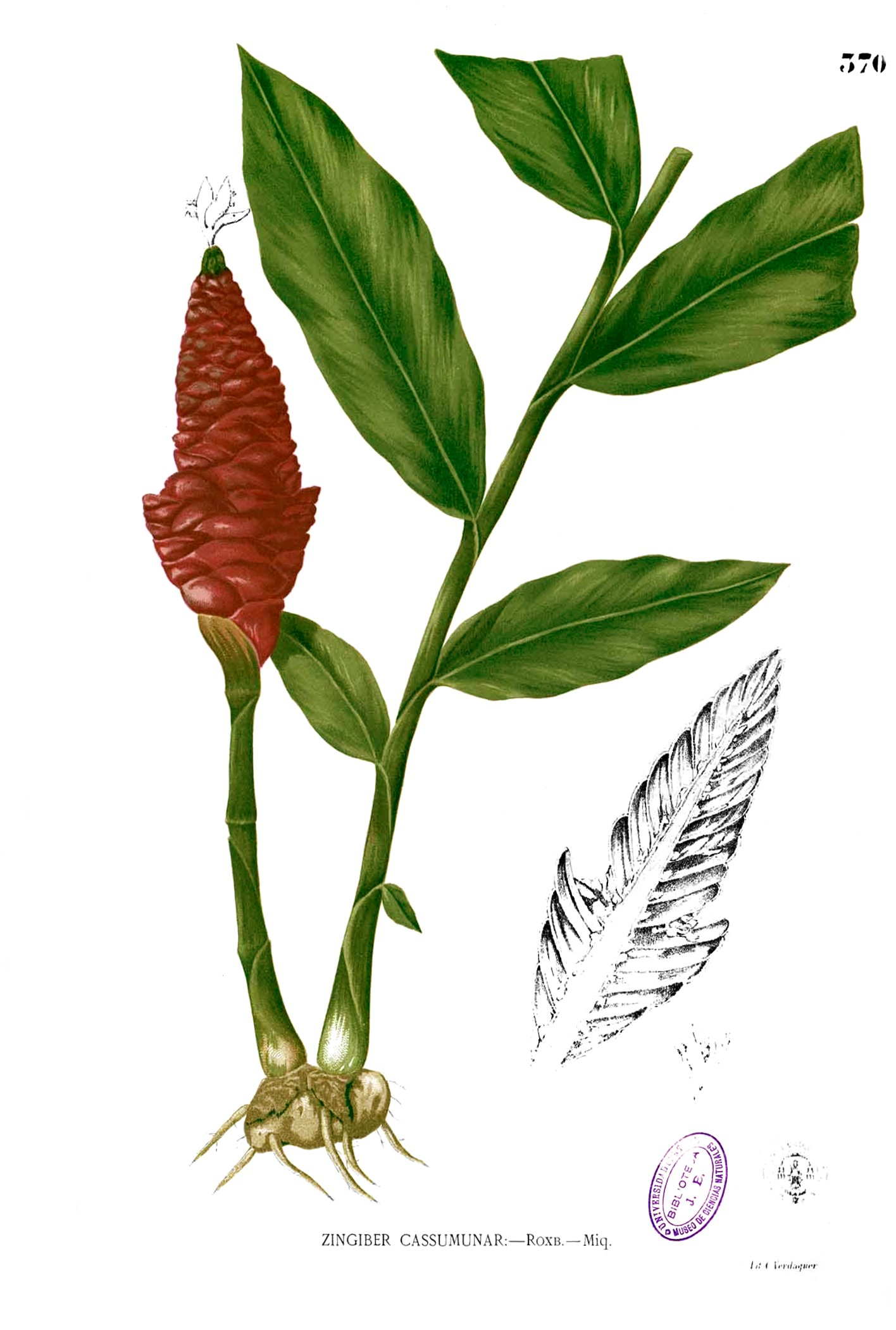
Zingiber montanum

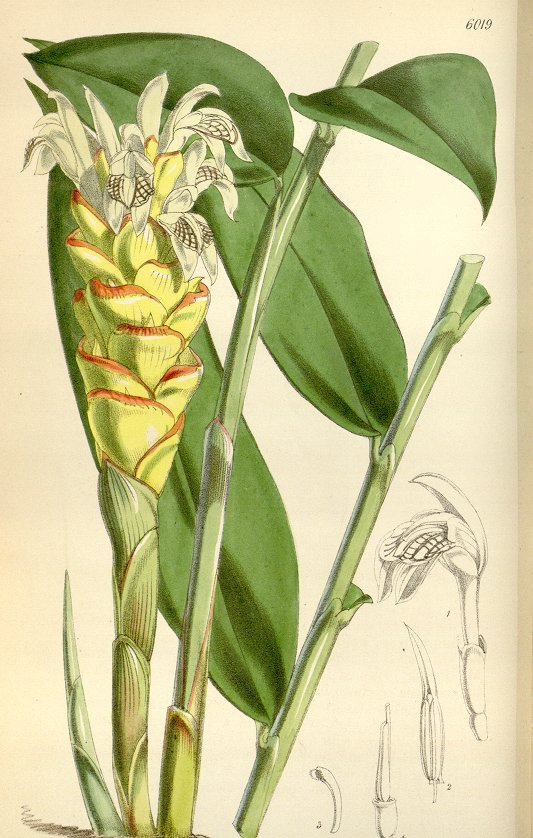
Zingiber parishii

As of January 2026, Plants of the World Online accepts the following 212 species:

- Zingiber acuminatum Valeton
- Zingiber aguingayae Docot
- Zingiber albiflorum R.M.Sm.
- Zingiber album Nurainas
- Zingiber anamalayanum Sujanapal & Sasidh.
- Zingiber angustifolium C.K.Lim & Meekiong
- Zingiber apoense Elmer
- Zingiber argenteum Mood & Theilade
- Zingiber arunachalensis A.Joe, T.Jayakr., Hareesh & M.Sabu
- Zingiber atroporphyreum Škorničk. & Q.B.Nguyen
- Zingiber atrorubens Gagnep.
- Zingiber aurantiacum (Holttum) Theilade
- Zingiber bambusifolium (H.Lév. & Vaniot) L.Bai, Škorničk. & N.H.Xia
- Zingiber banhaoense Mood & Theilade
- Zingiber barbatum Wall.
- Zingiber baumii Chatan & Promprom
- Zingiber belumense C.K.Lim & Meekiong
- Zingiber bipinianum D.K.Roy, D.Verma, Talukdar & Dutta Choud.
- Zingiber bisectum D.Fang
- Zingiber brachystachys Triboun & K.Larsen
- Zingiber bradleyanum Craib
- Zingiber brevifolium N.E.Br.
- Zingiber bulusanense Elmer
- Zingiber calcicola Y.H.Tan & H.B.Ding
- Zingiber callianthum Triboun & K.Larsen
- Zingiber campanulatum T.Jayakr., A.Joe, Hareesh & M.Sabu
- Zingiber capitatum Roxb.
- Zingiber cardiocheilum Škorničk. & Q.B.Nguyen
- Zingiber castaneum Škorničk. & Q.B.Nguyen
- Zingiber caudatum Biseshwori & Bipin
- Zingiber cernuum Dalzell
- Zingiber chantaranothaii Triboun & K.Larsen
- Zingiber chengii Y.H.Tseng, C.M.Wang & Y.C.Lin
- Zingiber chlorobracteatum Mood & Theilade
- Zingiber chrysanthum Roscoe
- Zingiber chrysostachys Ridl.
- Zingiber citriodorum Theilade & Mood
- Zingiber clarkei King ex Baker
- Zingiber cochleariforme D.Fang
- Zingiber collinsii Mood & Theilade
- Zingiber coloratum N.E.Br.
- Zingiber corallinum Hance
- Zingiber cornigerum T.Jayakr., A.Joe, Hareesh & M.Sabu
- Zingiber cornubracteatum Triboun & K.Larsen
- Zingiber curtisii Holttum
- Zingiber cylindricum Thwaites
- Zingiber densissimum S.Q.Tong & Y.M.Xia
- Zingiber dimapurense Odyuo, D.K.Roy & A.A.Mao
- Zingiber discolor Škorničk., H.Ð.Tran & Rybková
- Zingiber eberhardtii Gagnep.
- Zingiber eborinum Mood & Theilade
- Zingiber elatius (Ridl.) Theilade
- Zingiber elatum Roxb.
- Zingiber ellipticum (S.Q.Tong & Y.M.Xia) Q.G.Wu & T.L.Wu
- Zingiber engganoense Ardiyani
- Zingiber fallax (Loes.) L.Bai, Juan Chen & N.H.Xia
- Zingiber flagelliforme Mood & Theilade
- Zingiber flammeum Theilade & Mood
- Zingiber flaviflorum C.K.Lim & Meekiong
- Zingiber flavofusiforme M.M.Aung & Nob.Tanaka
- Zingiber flavomaculosum S.Q.Tong
- Zingiber flavovirens Theilade
- Zingiber fragile S.Q.Tong
- Zingiber fraseri Theilade
- Zingiber georgeae Mood & Theilade
- Zingiber gracile Jack
- Zingiber gramineum Noronha ex Blume
- Zingiber griffithii Baker
- Zingiber guangxiense D.Fang
- Zingiber gulinense Y.M.Xia
- Zingiber hainanense Y.S.Ye, L.Bai & N.H.Xia
- Zingiber idae Triboun & K.Larsen
- Zingiber incomptum B.L.Burtt & R.M.Sm.
- Zingiber inflexum Blume
- Zingiber inodorum L.Bai, Qing L.Wang, L.X.Yuan & Huan Tang
- Zingiber integrilabrum Hance
- Zingiber integrum S.Q.Tong
- Zingiber intermedium Baker
- Zingiber isanense Triboun & K.Larsen
- Zingiber jiewhoei Škorničk.
- Zingiber junceum Gagnep.
- Zingiber kangleipakense Kishor & Škorničk.
- Zingiber kawagoei Hayata
- Zingiber kelabitianum Theilade & H.Chr.
- Zingiber kerrii Craib
- Zingiber kunstleri King ex Ridl.
- Zingiber lambii Mood & Theilade
- Zingiber laoticum Gagnep.
- Zingiber latifolium Theilade & Mood
- Zingiber lecongkietii Škorničk. & H.Ð.Tran
- Zingiber leptorrhizum D.Fang
- Zingiber leptostachyum Valeton
- Zingiber leucochilum L.Bai, Škorničk. & N.H.Xia
- Zingiber ligulatum Roxb.
- Zingiber limianum Meekiong
- Zingiber locbacense D.D.Nguyen & C.W.Lin
- Zingiber loerzingii Valeton
- Zingiber longibracteatum Theilade
- Zingiber longiglande D.Fang & D.H.Qin
- Zingiber longii Y.H.Tan & H.B.Ding
- Zingiber longiligulatum S.Q.Tong
- Zingiber longipedunculatum Ridl.
- Zingiber longyanjiang Z.Y.Zhu
- Zingiber macradenium K.Schum.
- Zingiber macrocephalum (Zoll.) K.Schum.
- Zingiber macroglossum Valeton
- Zingiber macrorrhynchus K.Schum.
- Zingiber magang N.S.Lý & Škorničk.
- Zingiber malaysianum C.K.Lim
- Zingiber marginatum Roxb.
- Zingiber martini R.M.Sm.
- Zingiber matangense Noor Ain, Tawan & Meekiong
- Zingiber matupiense M.M.Aung & Nob.Tanaka
- Zingiber matutumense Mood & Theilade
- Zingiber mawangense Noor Ain & Meekiong
- Zingiber meghalayense Sushil K.Singh, Ram.Kumar & Mood
- Zingiber mekongense Gagnep.
- Zingiber mellis Škorničk., H.Ð.Tran & Sída f.
- Zingiber microcheilum Škorničk., H.Ð.Tran & Sída f.
- Zingiber mioga (Thunb.) Roscoe
- Zingiber mizoramense Ram.Kumar, Sushil K.Singh & S.Sharma
- Zingiber molle Ridl.
- Zingiber monophyllum Gagnep.
- Zingiber montanum (J.Koenig) Link ex A.Dietr.
- Zingiber multibracteatum Holttum
- Zingiber murlenica Ram.Kumar, Sushil K.Singh & S.Sharma
- Zingiber nanlingense Lin Chen, A.Q.Dong & F.W.Xing
- Zingiber natmataungense S.S.Zhou & R.Li
- Zingiber nazrinii C.K.Lim & Meekiong
- Zingiber neesanum (J.Graham) Ramamoorthy
- Zingiber neglectum Valeton
- Zingiber negrosense Elmer
- Zingiber neotruncatum T.L.Wu, K.Larsen & Turland
- Zingiber nigrimaculatum S.Q.Tong
- Zingiber nimmonii (J.Graham) Dalzell
- Zingiber nitens M.F.Newman
- Zingiber niveum Mood & Theilade
- Zingiber odoriferum Blume
- Zingiber officinale Roscoe
- Zingiber oligophyllum K.Schum.
- Zingiber olivaceum Mood & Theilade
- Zingiber orbiculatum S.Q.Tong
- Zingiber ottensii Valeton
- Zingiber pachysiphon B.L.Burtt & R.M.Sm.
- Zingiber panduratum Roxb.
- Zingiber papuanum Valeton
- Zingiber pardocheilum Wall. ex Baker
- Zingiber parishii Hook.f.
- Zingiber pauciflorum L.Bai, Škorničk., D.Z.Li & N.H.Xia
- Zingiber pellitum Gagnep.
- Zingiber pendulum Mood & Theilade
- Zingiber perenense Odyuo, D.K.Roy, Lyngwa & A.A.Mao
- Zingiber petiolatum (Holttum) Theilade
- Zingiber pherimaense Biseshwori & Bipin
- Zingiber phillippsiae Mood & Theilade
- Zingiber phumiangense Chaveer. & Mokkamul
- Zingiber pleiostachyum K.Schum.
- Zingiber plicatum Škorničk. & Q.B.Nguyen
- Zingiber popaense Nob.Tanaka
- Zingiber porphyrochilum Y.H.Tan & H.B.Ding
- Zingiber porphyrosphaerum K.Schum.
- Zingiber procumbens Nob.Tanaka & M.M.Aung
- Zingiber pseudopungens R.M.Sm.
- Zingiber pseudosquarrosum L.J.Singh & P.Singh
- Zingiber puberulum Ridl.
- Zingiber purpureoalbum Nob.Tanaka & M.M.Aung
- Zingiber purpureum Roscoe
- Zingiber pyroglossum Triboun & K.Larsen
- Zingiber raja C.K.Lim & Kharuk.
- Zingiber recurvatum S.Q.Tong & Y.M.Xia
- Zingiber reflexum Nob.Tanaka & M.M.Aung
- Zingiber roseum (Roxb.) Roscoe
- Zingiber rubens Roxb.
- Zingiber rufopilosum Gagnep.
- Zingiber sabuanum K.M.P.Kumar & A.Joe
- Zingiber sabun C.K.Lim
- Zingiber sadakornii Triboun & K.Larsen
- Zingiber salarkhanii M.A.Rahman & Yusuf
- Zingiber shuanglongense C.L.Yeh & S.W.Chung
- Zingiber sianginense Tatum & Arup K.Das
- Zingiber singapurense Škorničk.
- Zingiber sirindhorniae Triboun & Keerat.
- Zingiber skornickovae N.S.Lý
- Zingiber smilesianum Craib
- Zingiber spectabile Griff.
- Zingiber squarrosum Roxb.
- Zingiber stenostachys K.Schum.
- Zingiber striolatum Diels
- Zingiber subroseum Docot
- Zingiber sulphureum Burkill ex Theilade
- Zingiber tamii N.S.Lý & Škorničk.
- Zingiber tenuifolium L.Bai, Škorničk. & N.H.Xia
- Zingiber tenuiscapus Triboun & K.Larsen
- Zingiber thorelii Gagnep.
- Zingiber tuanjuum Z.Y.Zhu
- Zingiber ultralimitale Ardiyani & A.D.Poulsen
- Zingiber vanlithianum Koord.
- Zingiber velutinum Mood & Theilade
- Zingiber ventricosum L.Bai, Škorničk., N.H.Xia & Y.S.Ye
- Zingiber vinosum Mood & Theilade
- Zingiber viridiflavum Mood & Theilade
- Zingiber vittacheilum Triboun & K.Larsen
- Zingiber vuquangense N.S.Lý, T.H.Lê, T.H.Trinh, V.H.Nguyen & N.D.Do
- Zingiber wandingense S.Q.Tong
- Zingiber wightianum Thwaites
- Zingiber wrayi Prain ex Ridl.
- Zingiber yersinii Škorničk., H.Ð.Tran & Rybková
- Zingiber yingjiangense S.Q.Tong
- Zingiber yunnanense S.Q.Tong & X.Z.Liu
- Zingiber zerumbet (L.) Roscoe ex Sm.
- Zingiber zhuxiense G.X.Hu & S.Huang
- Zingiber zulkifliana S.Hoong Tan, Besi & Rusea
