= Ida Theilade =

Danish botanist

Ida Theilade is a Danish botanist. She is a professor of at the University of Copenhagen.

== Education ==
Theilade has a PhD in tropical botany from the University of Copenhagen.

Ida Theilade is chair of the board of the International Work Group for Indigenous Affairs. She is a member of the IUCN Species Survival Commission on threatened trees.
