= Mishti Hub =

Is an MSME enterprise of West Bengal to promote different types of sweets

Bangla Mishti Hub
- Company type: State-owned enterprise
- Industry: Small and medium-sized enterprises
- Founded: 2018
- Headquarters: Kolkata, West Bengal, India
- Area served: India
- Key people: Debashis Sen
- Products: Sweets & Snacks

Mishti Hub (মিষ্টি হাব) is an MSME enterprise established by the Government of West Bengal to promote different types of sweets of Indian state of West Bengal. One can have sweets made by renowned manufacturers and also by traditional manufactures from different parts of Bengal, in one place, under one roof, its only one of its kind in the state of West Bengal. It is located near Gate No.3 in Eco Park, New town.

== History ==
Mishti Hub, is another one of Chief Minister Mamata Banerjee's brain child, developed by HIDCO. The project was conceptualised by HIDCO in the year 2016 and the construction started from 2017. It was inaugurated on 5 July 2018, by State Urban Development minister Firhad Hakim. The Hub have 10 popular and prominent sweet manufacturers of Kolkata, as well as one sweet shop from districts, which will change from time to time giving the opportunity to other district shop to offer their special sweets. To maintain quality and class, all the sweet shops in the hub have an experience of 25 years or more in the sweet industry.

== Contemporary times ==
Mishti Hub, having in total 11 shops providing varieties of new and traditional sweets from all over West Bengal will remain open from 12 noon to 9 PM.

== The Sweet shops ==
Sweet Shop	Speciality
K.C. Das	Rosho Malancho
Banchharam	Abar Khabo
Gupta Brothers	Mango Sandesh
Balaram Mullick & Radharaman Mullick	Baked Rosogolla
Ganguram	Malai Chop
Nalin Chandra Das & Sons	Malai Roll
Mithai	Ghondhoraj lebur doi
Mishti Katha	Doi Rosogolla
Naba Krishna Guin	Chanar Gillipi
Hindusthan Sweets	Cream Roll
Surya Kumar Modak	Jolbhora Sandesh

=== Seasonal Sweet Shop ===
Mishti Bangla	Speciality
Burdwan	Sitabhog & Mihidana
Shaktigarh	Lyangcha
Baharampur	Chhenabara
Krishnanagar	Sarpuria & Sarbhaja
