= Enicospilus delphi =

Scientific classification
- Kingdom: Animalia
- Phylum: Arthropoda
- Clade: Pancrustacea
- Class: Insecta
- Order: Hymenoptera
- Family: Ichneumonidae
- Subfamily: Ophioninae
- Genus: Enicospilus
- Species: E. delphi

Binomial name
- Enicospilus delphi (Gauld & Mitchell, 1981)

Species of wasp

Enicospilus delphi is a species of wasp in the family Ichneumonidae.

== History ==
It was first described in 1981 by Gauld and Mitchell.
