= Hellwigia =

Hellwigia may refer to:

- Hellwigia (plant), a genus of plants in the family Zingiberaceae
- Hellwigia (wasp), a genus of insects in the family Ichneumonidae
