= Enicospilus marocator =

Scientific classification
- Kingdom: Animalia
- Phylum: Arthropoda
- Clade: Pancrustacea
- Class: Insecta
- Order: Hymenoptera
- Family: Ichneumonidae
- Subfamily: Ophioninae
- Genus: Enicospilus
- Species: E. marocator

Binomial name
- Enicospilus marocator (Aubert, 1982)

Synonyms
- Enicospilus canariensis Izquierdo, 1982

Species of wasp

Enicospilus marocator is a species of insect in the genus Enicospilus of the family Ichneumonidae within the order Hymenoptera.

== History ==
It was first scientifically described in 1982 by Aubert.
