= Enicospilus taberi =

Scientific classification
- Kingdom: Animalia
- Phylum: Arthropoda
- Clade: Pancrustacea
- Class: Insecta
- Order: Hymenoptera
- Family: Ichneumonidae
- Subfamily: Ophioninae
- Genus: Enicospilus
- Species: E. taberi

Binomial name
- Enicospilus taberi Gauld & Mitchell, 1981

Species of insect

Enicospilus taberi is a species of parasitoid wasp in the nocturnal genus Enicospilus of the family Ichneumonidae.

== History ==
It was described in 1981 by Gauld and Mitchell.
