= Enicospilus obliquus =

Scientific classification
- Kingdom: Animalia
- Phylum: Arthropoda
- Clade: Pancrustacea
- Class: Insecta
- Order: Hymenoptera
- Family: Ichneumonidae
- Subfamily: Ophioninae
- Genus: Enicospilus
- Species: E. obliquus

Binomial name
- Enicospilus obliquus (Morley, 1912)

Species of insect

Enicospilus obliquus is a species of insect in the genus Enicospilus of the family Ichneumonidae within the order Hymenoptera.
