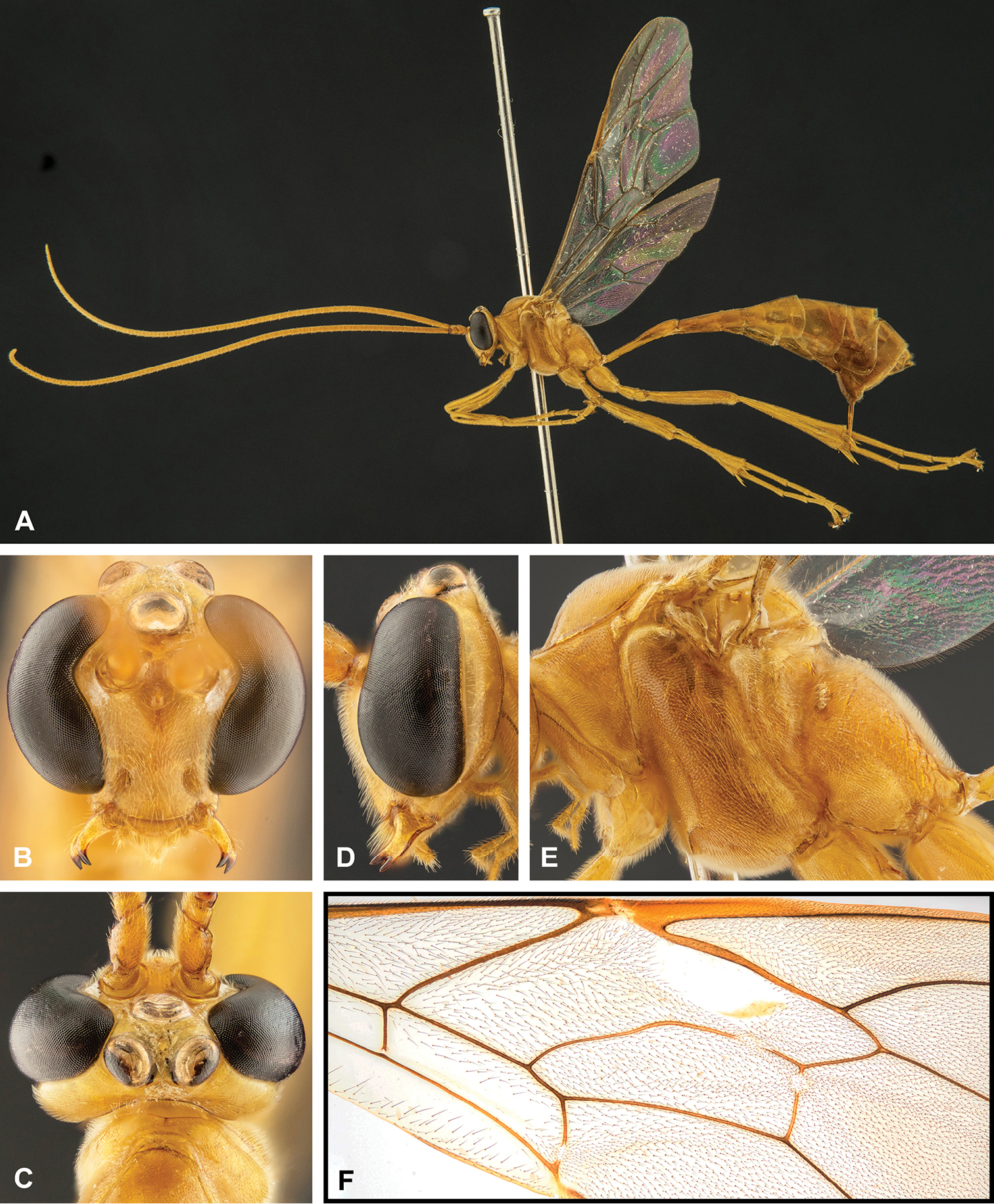

Scientific classification
- Kingdom: Animalia
- Phylum: Arthropoda
- Clade: Pancrustacea
- Class: Insecta
- Order: Hymenoptera
- Family: Ichneumonidae
- Subfamily: Ophioninae
- Genus: Enicospilus
- Species: E. pungens

Binomial name
- Enicospilus pungens (Smith, 1874)

= Enicospilus pungens =

Species of insect

Enicospilus pungens is a species of insect in the genus Enicospilus of the family Ichneumonidae within the order Hymenoptera

== History ==
It was first scientifically described in 1879 by Smith.
