= Enicospilus maruyamanus =

Scientific classification
- Kingdom: Animalia
- Phylum: Arthropoda
- Clade: Pancrustacea
- Class: Insecta
- Order: Hymenoptera
- Family: Ichneumonidae
- Subfamily: Ophioninae
- Genus: Enicospilus
- Species: E. maruyamanus

Binomial name
- Enicospilus maruyamanus (Uchida, 1928)

Species of insect

Enicospilus maruyamanus is a species of insect in the genus Enicospilus of the family Ichneumonidae within the order Hymenoptera.

== History ==
It was first scientifically described in 1928 by Uchida.
