= Enicospilus bantu =

Scientific classification
- Kingdom: Animalia
- Phylum: Arthropoda
- Clade: Pancrustacea
- Class: Insecta
- Order: Hymenoptera
- Family: Ichneumonidae
- Subfamily: Ophioninae
- Genus: Enicospilus
- Species: E. bantu

Binomial name
- Enicospilus bantu (Schulz, 1906)

Species of wasp

Enicospilus bantu is a species of insect in the genus Enicospilus of the family Ichneumonidae within the order Hymenoptera.

== History ==
It was first scientifically described in 1906 by Schulz.
