= Cardamom (disambiguation) =

Cardamom may refer to:

== Botanical ==
- Cardamom (or cardamon), species within two genera of the ginger family Zingiberaceae, namely Elettaria and Amomum
  - Black cardamom (or brown cardamom), a plant in the family Zingiberaceae having pods used as a spice
  - Green cardamom, Elettaria cardamomum, a plant in the family Zingiberaceae having pods used as a spice
    - Alleppey Green Cardamom, a variety of cardamom
    - Coorg Green Cardamom, a variety of cardamom
- Dwarf cardamom, Alpinia nutans, not a spice.

== Languages ==
- Cardamom Khmer (or Western Khmer), a Khmer language dialect spoken by some Khmer people

== People ==
- Zohran Mamdani (born 1991), Ugandan-American politician and former rapper known as Young Cardamom and Mr. Cardamom during his musical career

== Places ==
- Cardamom Hills, located in south-central Kerala, India
- Cardamom Mountains (or Krâvanh Mountains), a mountain range in the south-west area of Cambodia, near the border with Thailand
- Cardamom Town (theme park) in Norway
