= Hellwigia acuminata =

Scientific classification
- Kingdom: Plantae
- Clade: Tracheophytes
- Clade: Angiosperms
- Clade: Monocots
- Clade: Commelinids
- Order: Zingiberales
- Family: Zingiberaceae
- Genus: Hellwigia
- Species: H. acuminata

Binomial name
- Hellwigia acuminata (R.M.Sm.) Senjaya & A.D.Poulsen

Synonyms
- Alpinia acuminata R.M.Sm.; Rhynchanthus papuanus Gilli

Species of flowering plant

Hellwigia acuminata is a monocotyledonous plant species in the family Zingiberaceae. It was first described in 1983 as Rhynchanthus papuanus, and was more recently treated as Alpinia acuminata.

The species' range is New Guinea. No subspecies are listed in Plants of the World Online as of September 2026.

== Taxonomy ==
The species was first described by Alexander Gilli in 1983 as Rhynchanthus papuanus. In 1990, Rosemary Margaret Smith transferred it to Alpinia under the replacement name Alpinia acuminata, as the name Alpinia papuana had already been used for a different species. In 2025, on the basis of a molecular phylogenetic study, Hellwigia was re-established as a separate genus from Alpinia, and A. acuminata was transferred to Hellwigia as Hellwigia acuminata, the name by accepted by Plants of the World Online as of September 2026. (The earlier specific epithet papuanus is in use for a different species, Hellwigia papuana, transferred from Alpinia papuana first described in 1876.)
