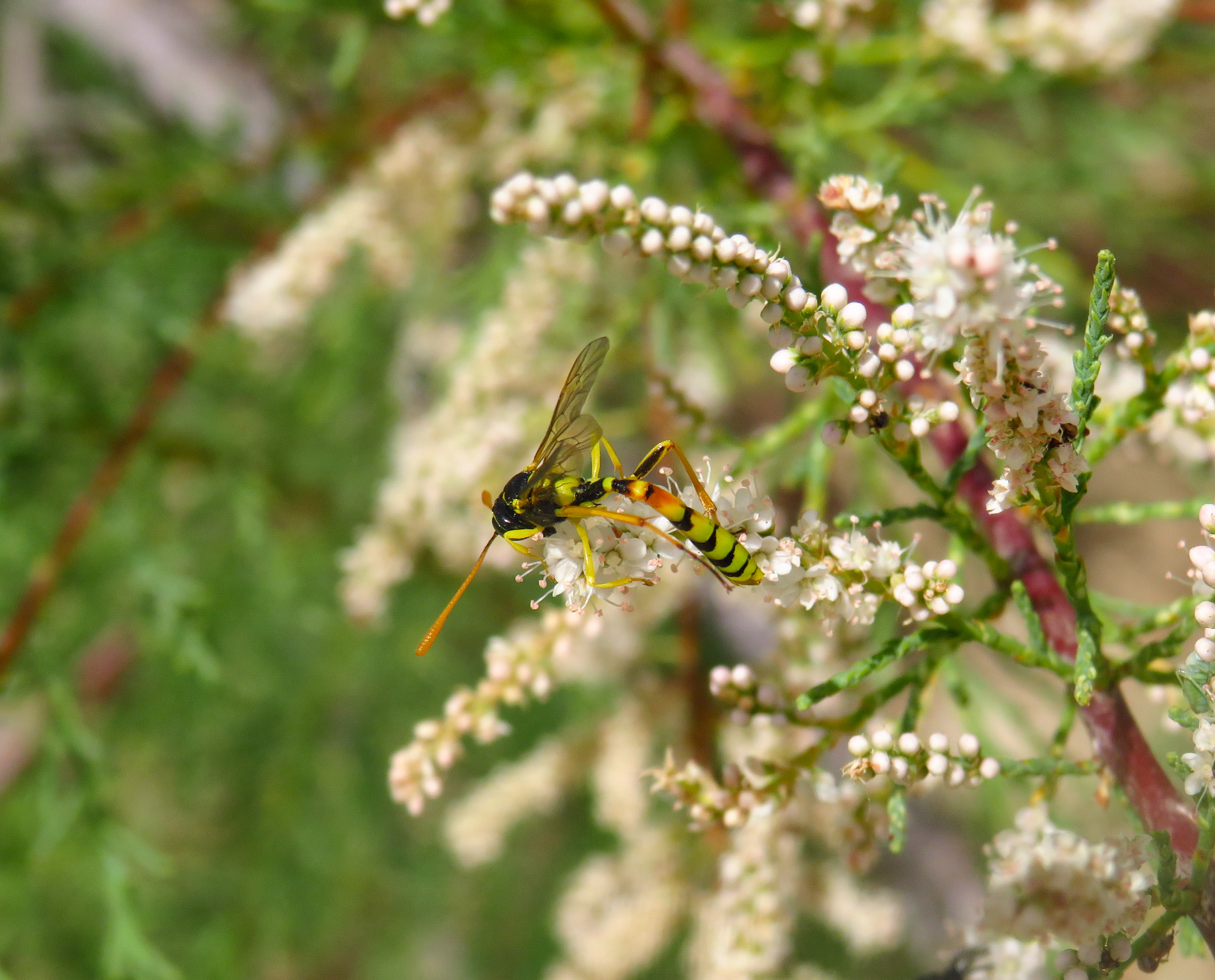

Scientific classification
- Kingdom: Animalia
- Phylum: Arthropoda
- Clade: Pancrustacea
- Class: Insecta
- Order: Hymenoptera
- Family: Ichneumonidae
- Subfamily: Ophioninae
- Genus: Hellwigia
- Species: H. elegans

Binomial name
- Hellwigia elegans Gravenhorst, 1823

= Hellwigia elegans =

Species of wasp

Hellwigia elegans is a species of ichneumon wasp.
