= Mihidana =

Indian sweet from Burdwan

Bardhamaner Mihidana
- Geographical indication
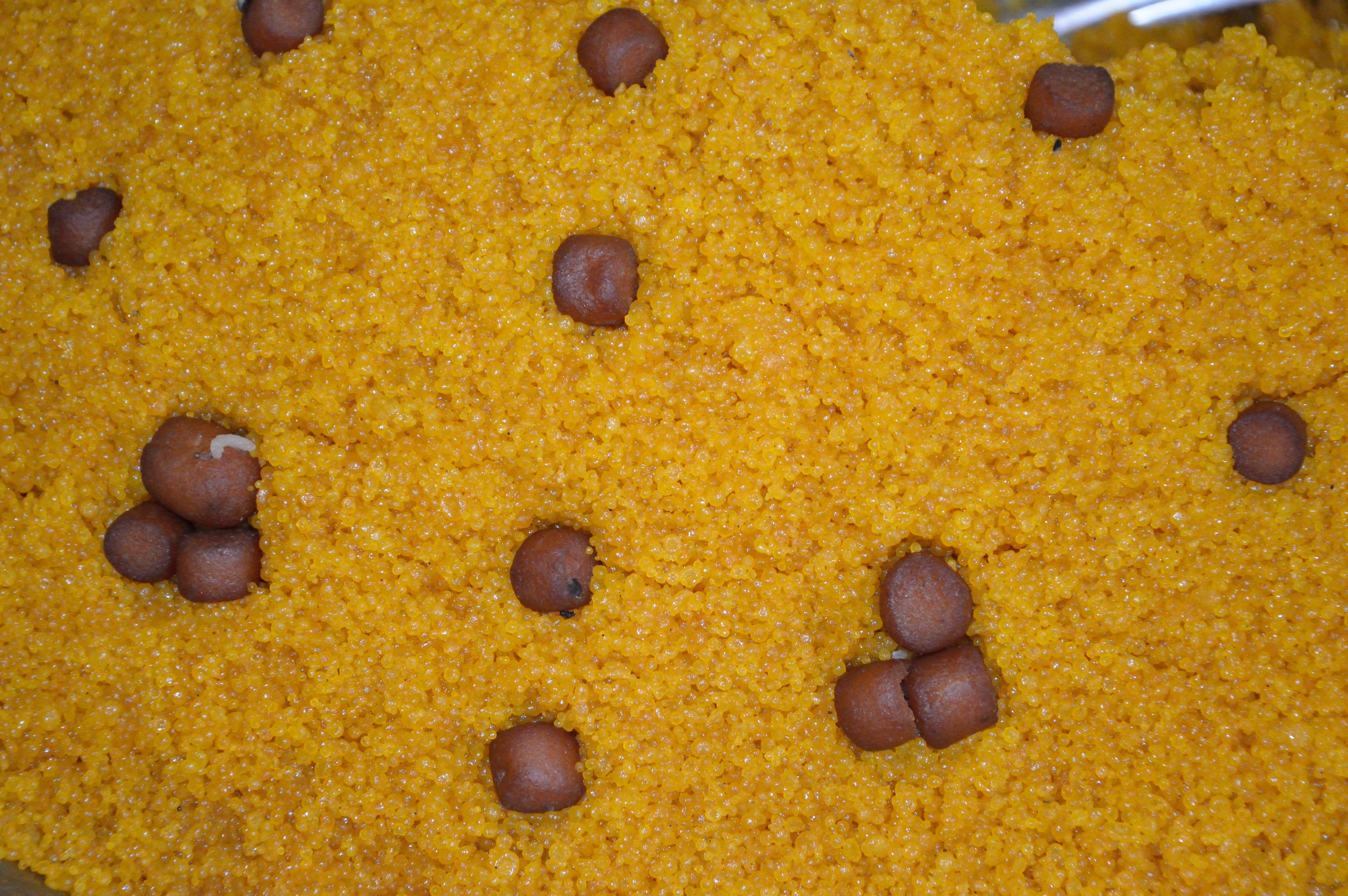
- Mihidana form Saktigarh
- Alternative names: বর্ধমানের মিহিদানা
- Description: Bardhamaner Mihidana is a type of sweet of West Bengal
- Type: Sweets of the Indian subcontinent
- Area: Bardhaman, West Bengal
- Country: India
- Registered: 29 April 2017
- Material: Powdered Kaminibhog, Gobindobhog and Basmati rice, Saffron, Ghee, Sugar
- Official website: ipindiaservices.gov.in

Mihidana (Bengali: মিহিদানা) is an Indian sweet from Burdwan, West Bengal, India. Mihidana, described as the micro cousin of the traditional Boondi, is derived from two words, Mihi meaning fine, and Dana, meaning grain.

== History ==
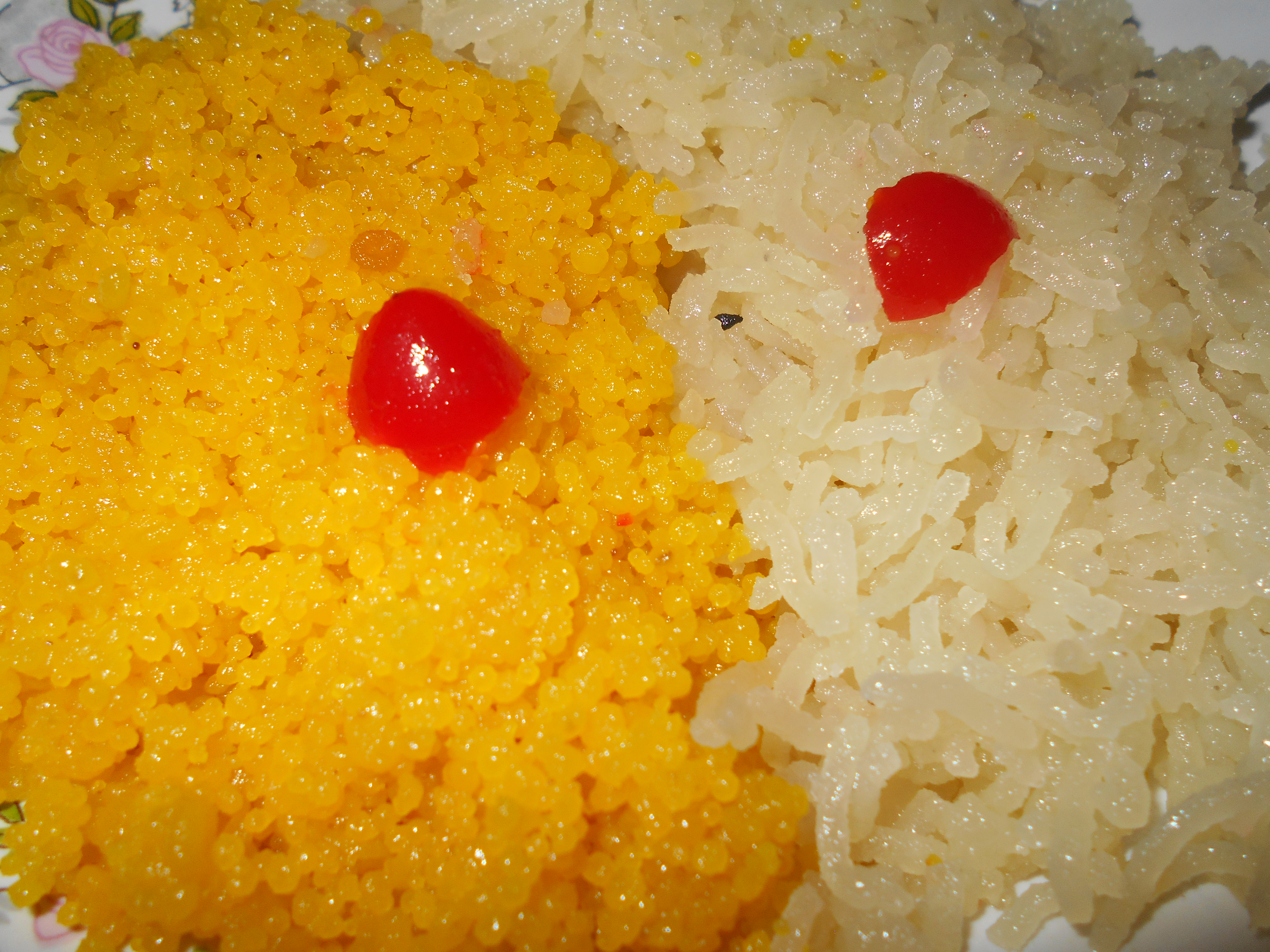
Sitabhog-Mihidana two in one

According to Late Nagendranath Nag, his grand-father Late Khettranath Nag first invented special Sitabhog and Mihidana in Bardhaman during the regime of Maharaja Late Mahatabchand Bahadur. Seventy two years after this invention, the name of Sitabhog and Mihidana earned its reputation all over India after the arrival of Lord Curzon in Bardhaman and his appraisal for these two sweets.

On invitation of Maharaja Vijaychand Mahatab, Lord Curzon visited Bardhaman on 19 August 1904. To memorize the welcome lunch of Lord Curzon, Maharaja ordered Vairabchandra Nag, a sweet-maker of the town, to prepare something new and unique which would amaze the Lord. Vairabchandra Nag undertook the responsibility and introduced two new preparations named Sitabhog and Mihidana. Lord Curzon was surprised to have such unique sweets and praised and thanked Vairabchandra Nag in the certificate given to him saying he never had such sweet ever before. Thereafter, the quality and name of these two sweets reached all over the country and abroad. Late Nagendranath Nag, son of Late Vairabchandra Nag, broadcast this incident in Radio on 15 November 1976.

== Process ==
The dessert is made from powdered Kaminibhog, Gobindobhog and basmati rice, mixed with a small amount of gram flour and saffron for a golden colour. It is then blended with water by hand till its colour lightens. This mix is then poured through a brass ladle with tiny holes into a pot of ghee and deep-fried. The fine fried small rice-like grains are dipped in sugar syrup and drained once soaked.

== Popularity ==
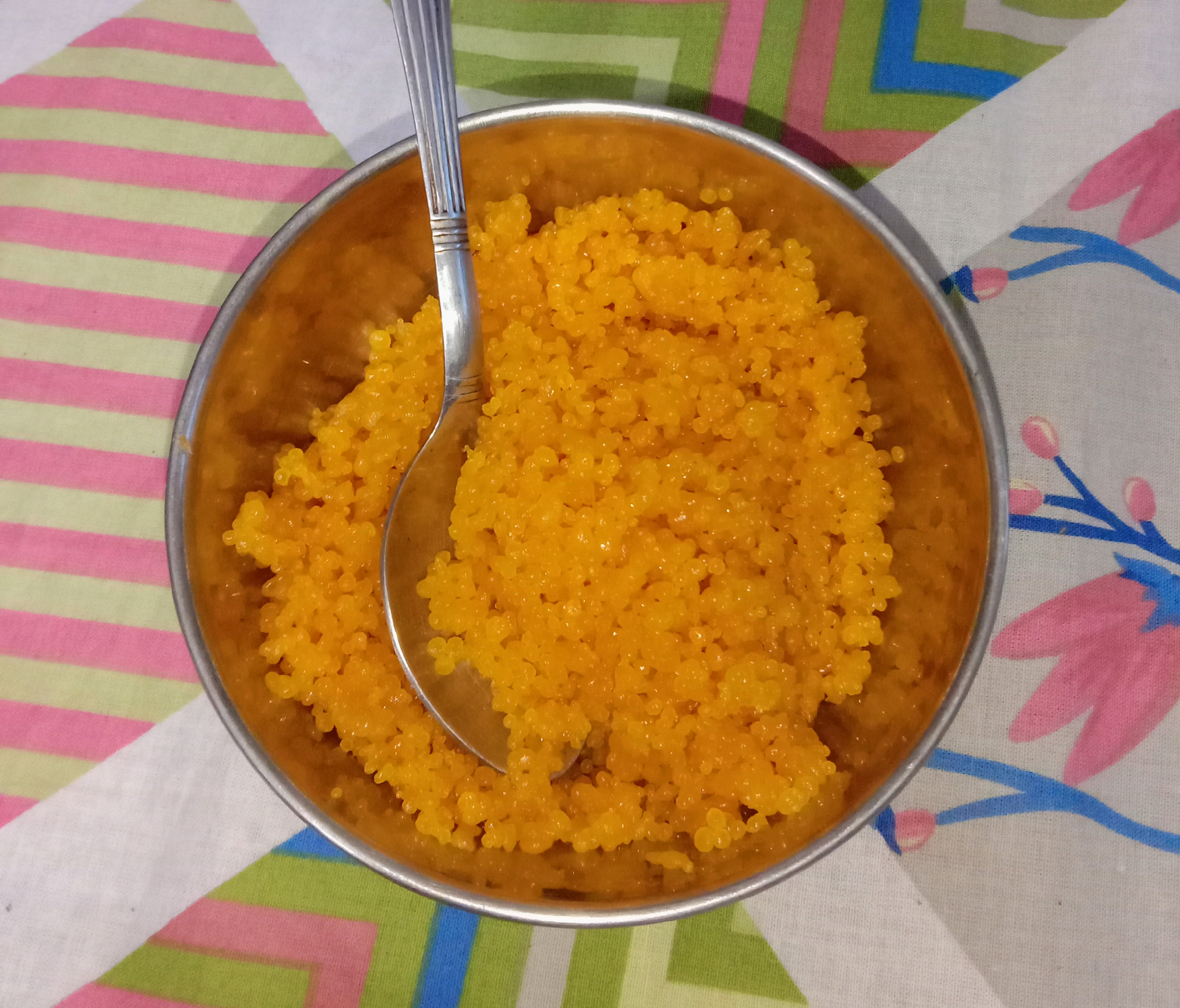
Mihidana served on the day of Bijoya Doshomi.

Famous Bengali actor, comedian and theater personality, Nabadwip Haldar song this line-

Bagbazar rasgolla, Bhim Nagar Sandesh
Bardhamaner Siddhog, Mithidana Dorbesh

Mihidana also found in Pagla Dashu stories of Sukumar Roy.

== Geographical Indications ==
Mihidana of Bardhaman in West Bengal get the Geographical Indications of West Bengal on 29 April 2017 for the innovative and unique sweet.

== See also ==
- Sitabhog
- Langcha
