= Enicospilus cameronii =

Scientific classification
- Kingdom: Animalia
- Phylum: Arthropoda
- Clade: Pancrustacea
- Class: Insecta
- Order: Hymenoptera
- Family: Ichneumonidae
- Subfamily: Ophioninae
- Genus: Enicospilus
- Species: E. cameronii

Binomial name
- Enicospilus cameronii (Dalla Torre, 1901)

Synonyms
- Enicospilus renovatus (Morley, 1912); Enicospilus latilineatus (Cameron, 1911); Enicospilus curvinervis (Cameron, 1886)

Species of insect

Enicospilus cameronii is a species of insect in the genus Enicospilus of the family Ichneumonidae within the order Hymenoptera.

It was first scientifically described in 1901 by Dalla Torre.
