= Sitabhog =

Sweet from Bardhaman, West Bengal, India

- Geographical indication
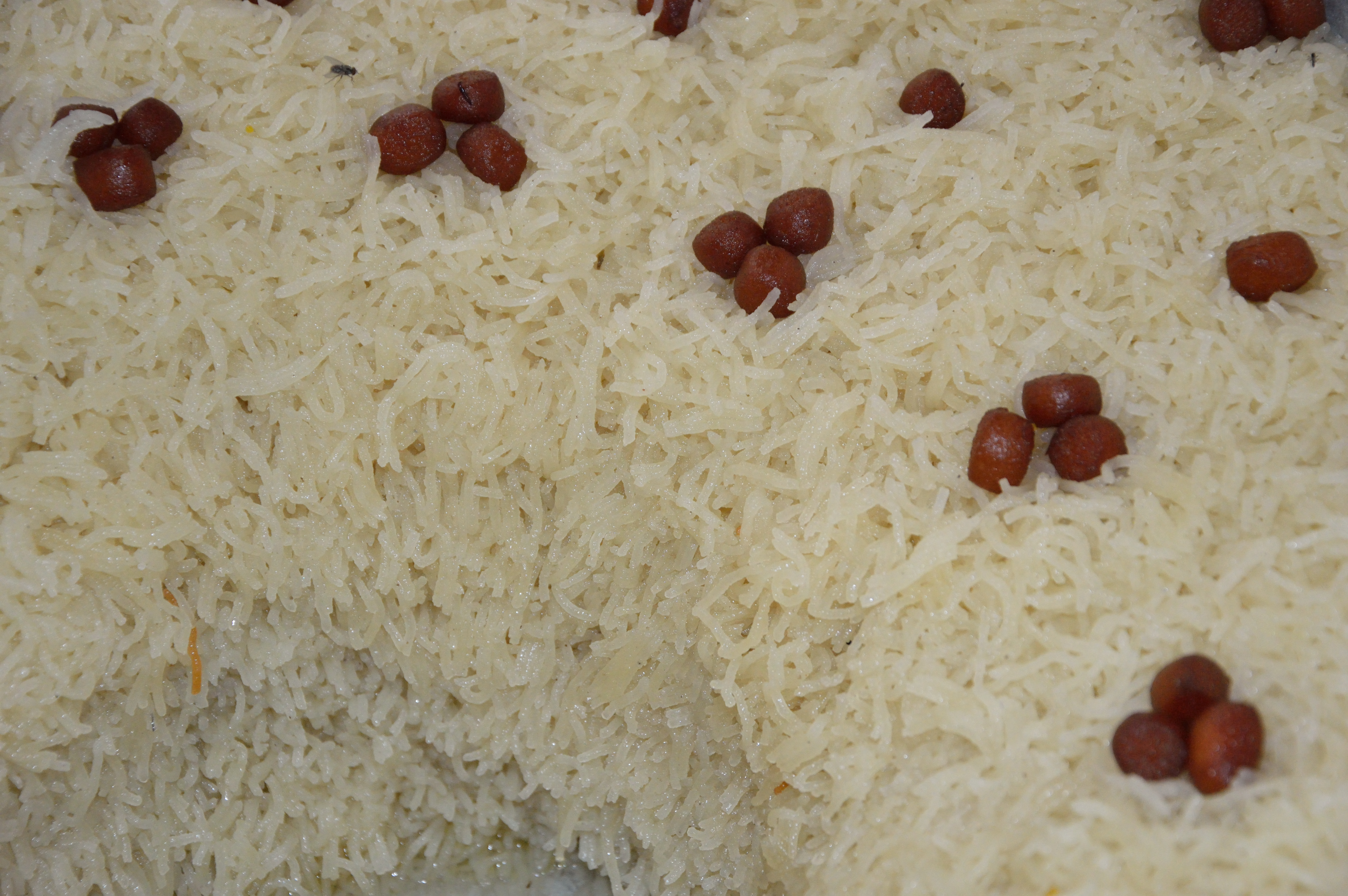
- Sitabhog from Saktigarh
- Description: Bardhamaner Sitabhog is a type of sweet of West Bengal, India
- Type: Sweets of the Indian subcontinent
- Area: Bardhaman, West Bengal, India
- Country: India
- Registered: 29 April 2017
- Official website: ipindiaservices.gov.in

Sitabhog (Bengali: সীতাভোগ) is a famous sweet of Bardhaman, West Bengal, India. Sitabhog is a flavourful dessert that looks like white rice or vermicelli mixed with small pieces of Gulab jamun. Made from cottage cheese (also known as chhena in Bengali), rice flour and sugar, Sitabhog often gives the appearance of pulao, which is albeit sweet in taste.

== History ==
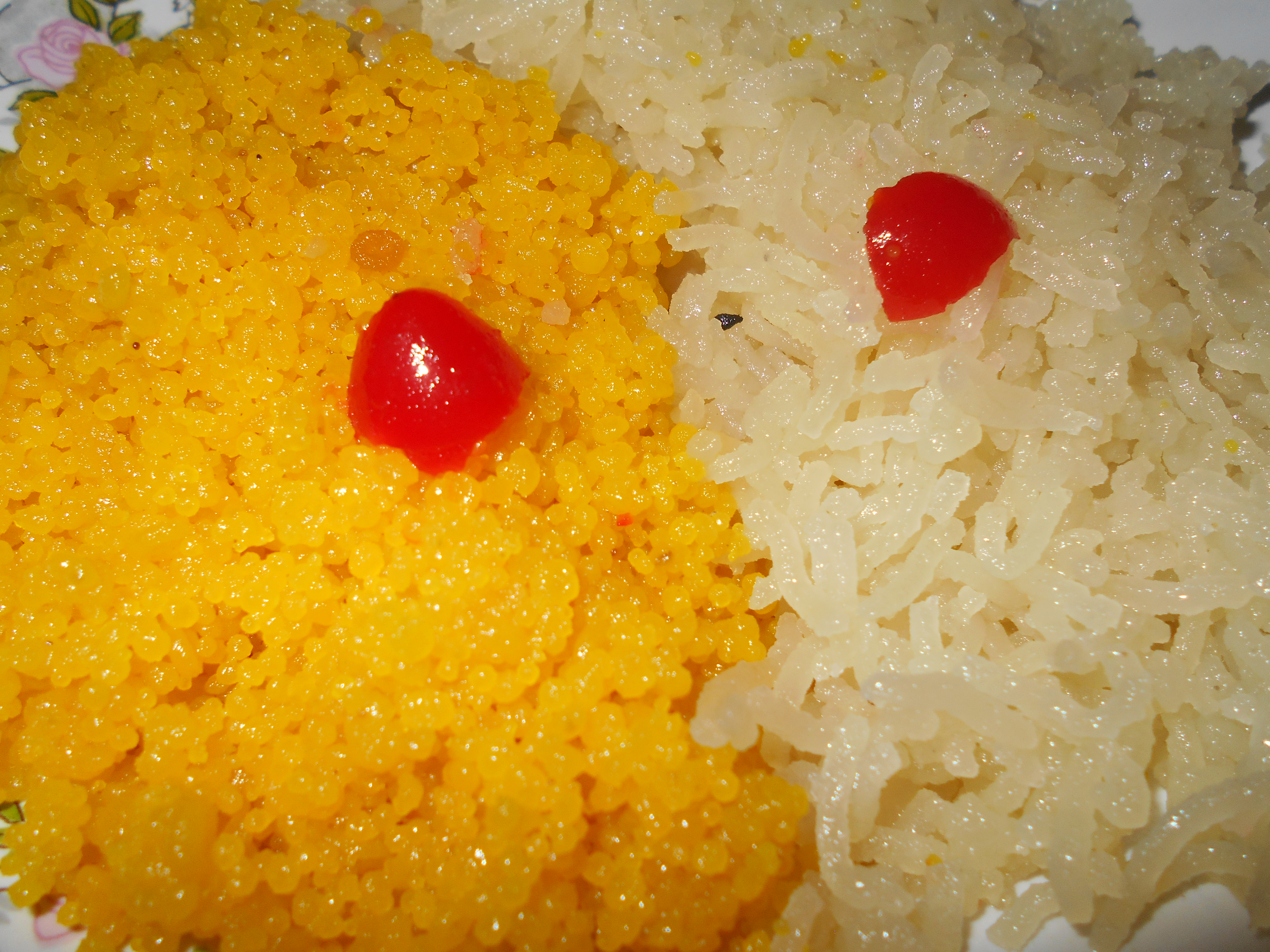
Sitabhog-Mihidana two in one

According to Late Nagendranath Nag, his grandfather Late Khettranath Nag first invented special Sitabhog and Mihidana in Bardhaman during the regime of Maharaja Late Mahatabchand Bahadur. Seventy two years after this invention the name of Sitabhog and Mihidana earned its reputation all over India after the arrival of Lord Curzon in Bardhaman and his appraisal for these two sweets.

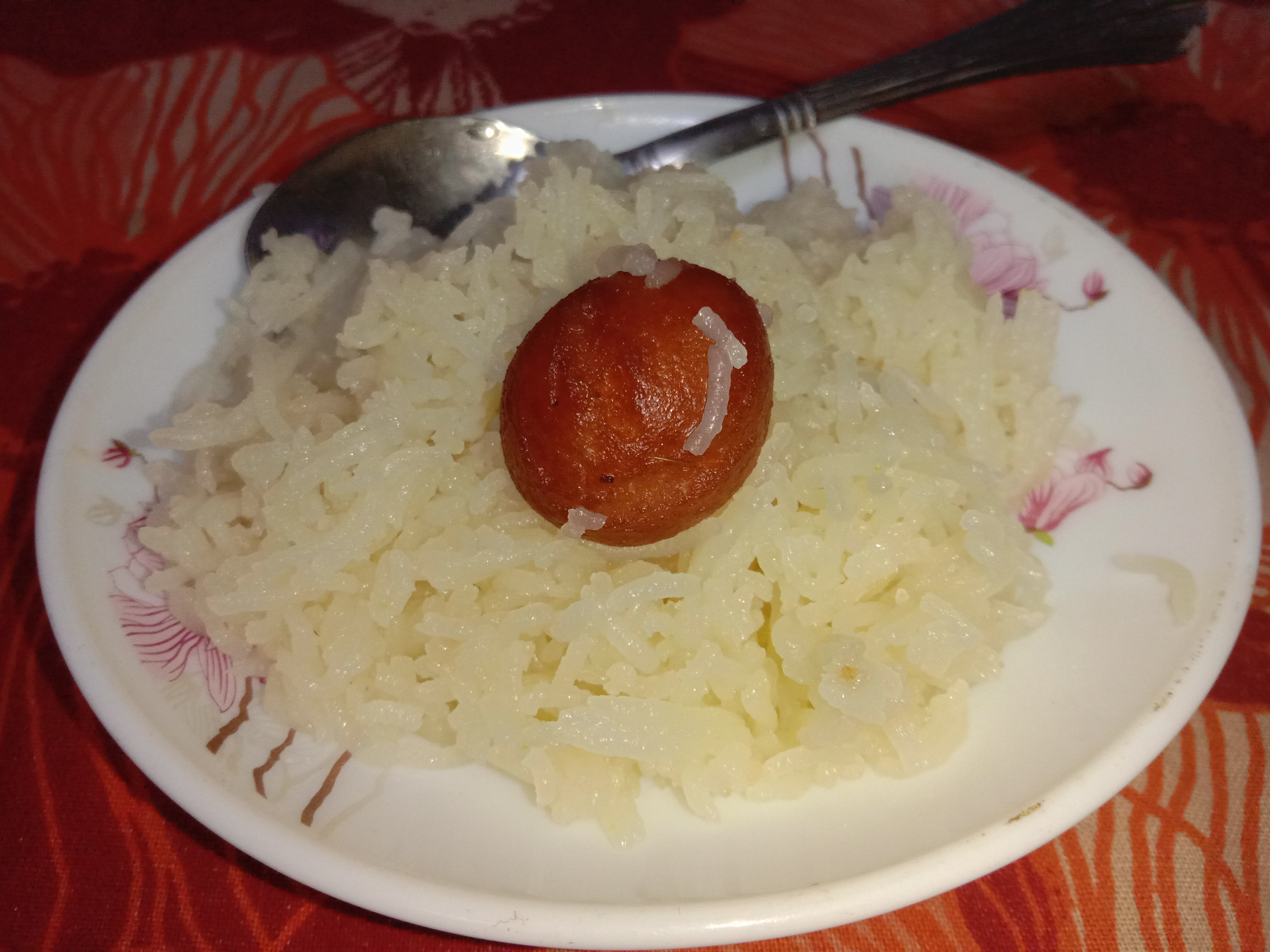
Nikhuti atop of Sitabhog

On invitation of Maharaja Vijaychand Mahatab Lord Curzon visited Bardhaman on 19 August 1904. To memorize the welcome lunch of Lord Curzon, Maharaja ordered Vairabchandra Nag, a sweet-maker of the town, to prepare something new and unique which would amaze the Lord. Vairabchandra Nag undertook the responsibility and introduced two new preparations named Sitabhog and Mihidana. Lord Curzon was surprised to have such unique sweets and praised and thanked Vairabchandra Nag in the certificate given to him saying he never had such sweet ever before. Thereafter, the quality and name of these two sweets reached all over the country and abroad. Late Nagendranath Nag, son of Late Vairabchandra Nag, broadcast this incident on Radio on 15 November 1976.

== Popularity ==
Bengali actor, comedian and theater personality, Nabadwip Haldar sang this line-

Bagbazar rasgolla, Bhim Nagar Sandesh
Bardhamaner Siddhog, Mithidana Dorbesh

== Geographical Indications ==
Sitabhog of Bardhaman achieved the Geographical Indications of West Bengal on 29 April 2017.

== See also ==
- Mihidana
- Langcha
- Mysore pak
- Dharwad pedha
