= Enicospilus seminiger =

Scientific classification
- Kingdom: Animalia
- Phylum: Arthropoda
- Clade: Pancrustacea
- Class: Insecta
- Order: Hymenoptera
- Family: Ichneumonidae
- Subfamily: Ophioninae
- Genus: Enicospilus
- Species: E. seminiger

Binomial name
- Enicospilus seminiger (Szepligeti, 1906)

Synonyms
- Enicospilus tosquineti (Morley, 1912); Enicospilus trimaculatus (Tosquinet, 1896)

Species of insect

Enicospilus seminiger is a species of insect in the genus Enicospilus of the family Ichneumonidae within the order Hymenoptera

== History ==
It was first scientifically described in 1906 by Szepligeti.
