= Enicospilus chaconi =

Scientific classification
- Kingdom: Animalia
- Phylum: Arthropoda
- Clade: Pancrustacea
- Class: Insecta
- Order: Hymenoptera
- Family: Ichneumonidae
- Subfamily: Ophioninae
- Genus: Enicospilus
- Species: E. chaconi

Binomial name
- Enicospilus chaconi Gauld, 1988

Species of insect

Enicospilus chaconi is a species of ichneumon wasp. It was described from Costa Rica in 1988.
