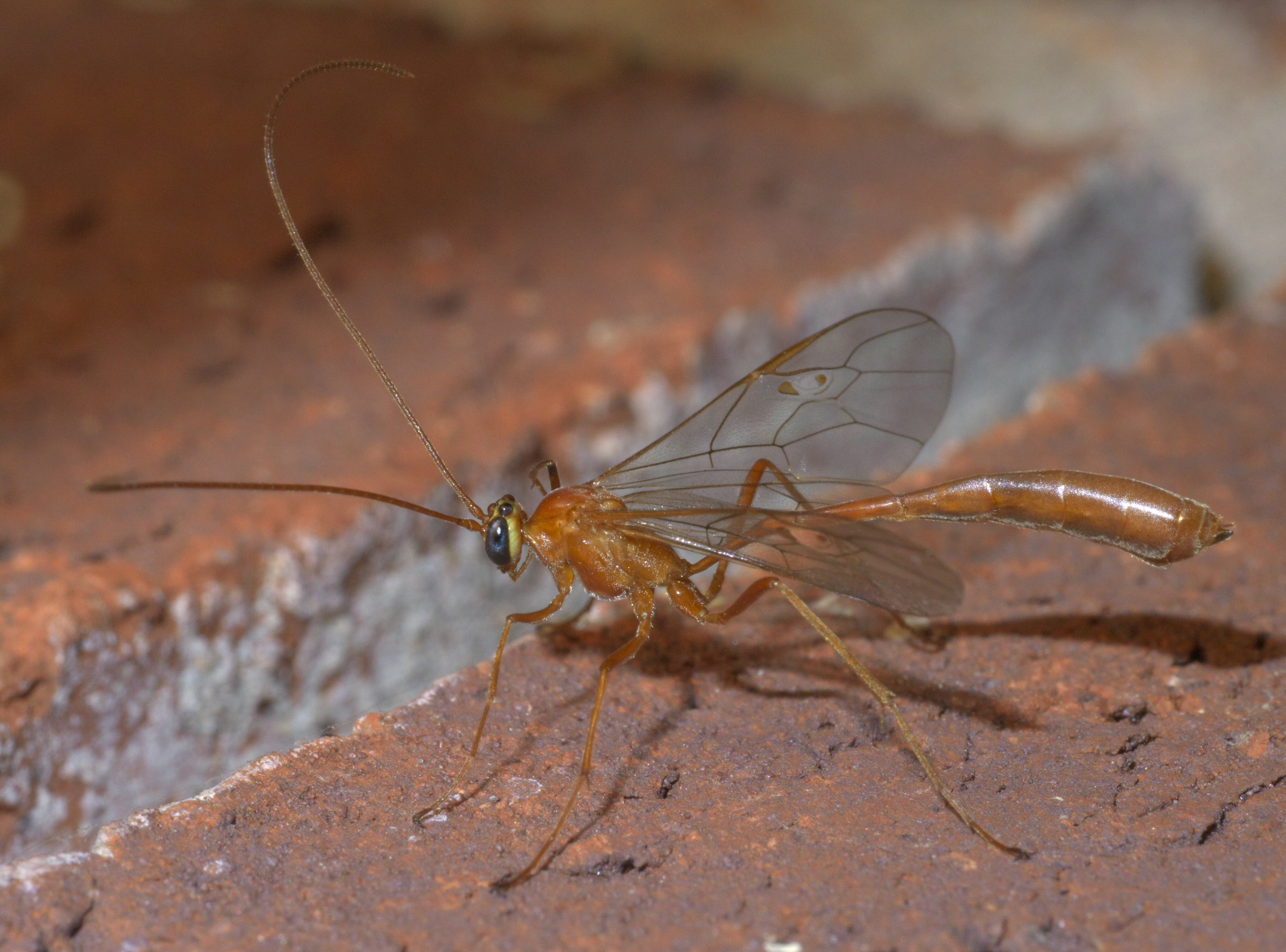
- Enicospilus purgatus

Scientific classification
- Kingdom: Animalia
- Phylum: Arthropoda
- Clade: Pancrustacea
- Class: Insecta
- Order: Hymenoptera
- Family: Ichneumonidae
- Subfamily: Ophioninae
- Tribe: Enicospilini

Genera
- Dicamptus; Enicospilus; Hellwigiella; Laticoleus

= Enicospilini =

Tribe of wasps

Enicospilini is a tribe of Ichneumonidae wasp, parasitizing Lepidoptera larva. Four genera are currently classified within the tribe.
