= Alpinia nutans =

Alpinia nutans is the binomial name of two species of plant:

- Alpinia nutans (L.) Roscoe is a synonym of Hellwigia nutans
- Alpinia nutans K.Schum. is a synonym of Alpinia zerumbet
