= Ian D. Gauld =

British entomologist

- Photo of Gauld in 1975/6 at the Natural History Museum in London.
- Born: 25 May 1947
- Died: 12 January 2009 (aged 61)
- Scientific career
- Author abbrev. (zoology): Gauld

Ian D. Gauld (1947–2009) was a British entomologist who specialised in the study of parasitic ichneumon wasps. According to his obituary, he is the most prolific ichneumon taxonomist in history, describing over 2000 species of ichneumonids.
