= Hellwigia (plant) =

Scientific classification
- Kingdom: Plantae
- Clade: Tracheophytes
- Clade: Angiosperms
- Clade: Monocots
- Clade: Commelinids
- Order: Zingiberales
- Family: Zingiberaceae
- Subfamily: Alpinioideae
- Tribe: Alpinieae
- Genus: Hellwigia; Warb.

Synonyms
- Eriolopha Ridl.

Genus of flowering plants

Hellwigia is a genus of 76 plants in the family Zingiberaceae separated from the larger genus Alpinia in 2025. Its native range is from the Lesser Sunda Islands to the Western Pacific.

== Description ==
The genus Helwigia consists of herbaceous plants of various sizes, usually forming clumps. The leaves are arranged distichously, i.e. in two vertical columns on opposite sides of the stem. The inflorescence is normally at the end of a leafy shoot, and is thyrse of some kind. The flowers are usually densely packed, and vary somewhat in shape. Sometimes there are both perfect (bisexual) and male flowers on the same plant.

== Taxonomy ==
The genus Hellwigia was erected by Otto Warburg in 1891. In 1904, Karl Moritz Schumann sank Hellwigia into the larger genus Alpinia. In 2025, on the basis of a molecular phylogenetic study, Hellwigia was re-established as an independent genus. It is placed in the tribe Alpinieae of the subfamily Alpinioideae.

=== Species ===
As of September 2026, Plants of the World Online accepted the following 76 species:

- Hellwigia acuminata (R.M.Sm.) Senjaya & A.D.Poulsen – Papua New Guinea
- Hellwigia aenea Hellwigia aenea (B.L.Burtt & R.M.Sm.) Senjaya & A.D.Poulsen – Lesser Sunda Islands & Sulawesi
- Hellwigia albipurpurea (K.Schum.) Senjaya & A.D.Poulsen – Papua New Guinea
- Hellwigia arfakensis (P.Royen) Senjaya & A.D.Poulsen – West Papua
- Hellwigia athroantha (Valeton) Senjaya & A.D.Poulsen – West Papua
- Hellwigia biakensis (R.M.Sm.) Senjaya & A.D.Poulsen – New Guinea, Sulawesi
- Hellwigia boia (Seem.) Senjaya & A.D.Poulsen – Fiji
- Hellwigia calycodes (K.Schum.) Senjaya & A.D.Poulsen – New Guinea
- Hellwigia carinata (Valeton) Senjaya & A.D.Poulsen – West Papua
- Hellwigia carolinensis (Koidz.) Senjaya & A.D.Poulsen – Caroline Islands
- Hellwigia celebica (Ridl.) Senjaya & A.D.Poulsen – Sulawesi
- Hellwigia chaunocolea (K.Schum.) Senjaya & A.D.Poulsen – West Papua
- Hellwigia coeruleoviridis (K.Schum.) Senjaya & A.D.Poulsen
- Hellwigia conferta (B.L.Burtt & R.M.Sm.) Senjaya & A.D.Poulsen – Solomon Islands
- Hellwigia conglomerata (R.M.Sm.) Senjaya & A.D.Poulsen – Papua New Guinea
- Hellwigia cylindrocephala (K.Schum.) Senjaya & A.D.Poulsen – Sulawesi
- Hellwigia dasystachys (Valeton) Senjaya & A.D.Poulsen – West Papua
- Hellwigia dekockii (Valeton) Senjaya & A.D.Poulsen – West Papua
- Hellwigia densiflora (K.Schum.) Senjaya & A.D.Poulsen – West Papua
- Hellwigia divaricata (Valeton) Senjaya & A.D.Poulsen – West Papua
- Hellwigia flagellaris (Ridl.) Senjaya & A.D.Poulsen – New Guinea
- Hellwigia gigantea (Blume) Senjaya & A.D.Poulsen – Maluku Islands
- Hellwigia glacicaerulea (R.M.Sm.) Senjaya & A.D.Poulsen – Sulawesi
- Hellwigia gracillima (Valeton) Senjaya & A.D.Poulsen – West Papua
- Hellwigia hagena (R.M.Sm.) Senjaya & A.D.Poulsen – Papua New Guinea
- Hellwigia himantoglossa (Ridl.) Senjaya & A.D.Poulsen – West Papua
- Hellwigia horneana (K.Schum.) Senjaya & A.D.Poulsen – Fiji
- Hellwigia inaequalis (Ridl.) Senjaya & A.D.Poulsen – West Papua
- Hellwigia janowskii (Valeton) Senjaya & A.D.Poulsen – West Papua
- Hellwigia juliformis (Ridl.) Senjaya & A.D.Poulsen – New Guinea
- Hellwigia kiungensis (R.M.Sm.) Senjaya & A.D.Poulsen – Papua New Guinea
- Hellwigia klossii (Ridl.) Senjaya & A.D.Poulsen – West Papua
- Hellwigia laxisecunda (B.L.Burtt & R.M.Sm.) Senjaya & A.D.Poulsen – Solomon Islands
- Hellwigia leptostachya (Valeton) Senjaya & A.D.Poulsen – West Papua
- Hellwigia manostachys (Valeton) Senjaya & A.D.Poulsen – Bali, New Guinea
- Hellwigia maxii (R.M.Sm.) Senjaya & A.D.Poulsen – Sulawesi
- Hellwigia monopleura (K.Schum.) Senjaya & A.D.Poulsen – Sulawesi, Maluku Islands
- Hellwigia multispica (Ridl.) Senjaya & A.D.Poulsen – West Papua
- Hellwigia musifolia (Ridl.) Senjaya & A.D.Poulsen – Philippines
- Hellwigia nidus-vespae (A.Raynal & J.Raynal) Senjaya & A.D.Poulsen – Vanuatu
- Hellwigia novae-hiberniae (B.L.Burtt & R.M.Sm.) Senjaya & A.D.Poulsen – Bismarck Archipelago
- Hellwigia nutans (L.) Senjaya & A.D.Poulsen – Maluku Islands
- Hellwigia odontonema (K.Schum.) Senjaya & A.D.Poulsen – New Guinea, Bismarck Archipelago
- Hellwigia oligantha (Valeton) Senjaya & A.D.Poulsen – West Papua
- Hellwigia orientalis (Docot & Banag) Senjaya & A.D.Poulsen – Philippines
- Hellwigia papuana (Scheff.) Senjaya & A.D.Poulsen – West Papua
- Hellwigia parksii (Gillespie) Senjaya & A.D.Poulsen – Fiji
- Hellwigia platylopha (Ridl.) Senjaya & A.D.Poulsen – West Papua
- Hellwigia porphyrea (R.M.Sm.) Senjaya & A.D.Poulsen – West Papua
- Hellwigia porphyrocarpa (Ridl.) Senjaya & A.D.Poulsen – West Papua
- Hellwigia pulchra Warb. – Papua New Guinea, Solomon Islands
- Hellwigia regia (K.Heyne ex R.M.Sm.) Senjaya & A.D.Poulsen – Maluku Islands
- Hellwigia rigida (Ridl.) Senjaya & A.D.Poulsen – West Papua
- Hellwigia rosacea (Valeton) Senjaya & A.D.Poulsen – New Guinea
- Hellwigia salomonensis (B.L.Burtt & R.M.Sm.) Senjaya & A.D.Poulsen – Solomon Islands
- Hellwigia samoensis (Reinecke) Senjaya & A.D.Poulsen – Samoa
- Hellwigia sandsii (R.M.Sm.) Senjaya & A.D.Poulsen – Sulawesi
- Hellwigia schultzei (Lauterb. ex Valeton) Senjaya & A.D.Poulsen – Papua New Guinea
- Hellwigia sericea (Ridl.) Senjaya & A.D.Poulsen – West Papua
- Hellwigia sericiflora (K.Schum.) Senjaya & A.D.Poulsen – New Guinea
- Hellwigia singuliflora (R.M.Sm.) Senjaya & A.D.Poulsen – Papua New Guinea
- Hellwigia stenobracteolata (R.M.Sm.) Senjaya & A.D.Poulsen – Papua New Guinea
- Hellwigia strobilacea (K.Schum.) Senjaya & A.D.Poulsen – West Papua
- Hellwigia subverticillata (Valeton) Senjaya & A.D.Poulsen – New Guinea
- Hellwigia superba (Ridl.) Senjaya & A.D.Poulsen – West Papua
- Hellwigia tristachya (Ridl.) Senjaya & A.D.Poulsen – New Guinea
- Hellwigia unilateralis (B.L.Burtt & R.M.Sm.) Senjaya & A.D.Poulsen – Solomon Islands
- Hellwigia valetoniana (Loes.) ined. – West Papua
- Hellwigia velutina (P.Royen) Senjaya & A.D.Poulsen – Papua New Guinea
- Hellwigia vitiensis (Seem.) Senjaya & A.D.Poulsen – Fiji
- Hellwigia vulcanica (Elmer) Senjaya & A.D.Poulsen – Philippines
- Hellwigia werneri (Lauterb. ex Valeton) Senjaya & A.D.Poulsen – Papua New Guinea
- Hellwigia womersleyi (R.M.Sm.) Senjaya & A.D.Poulsen – Papua New Guinea

== Distribution ==
Hellwigia species predominantly inhabit submontane and montane zones. In Sulawesi, they typically occur between 740 and 2,950 m, and they remain confined to montane habitats on smaller islands. Even lowland records of H. porphyrocarpa and H. carinata are restricted to valleys within the Papua Pegunungan range, reinforcing the genus's strict affinity for elevated environments. It is native to the Bismarck Archipelago, the Caroline Islands, Fiji, the Lesser Sunda Islands, the Maluku Islands, New Guinea, the Philippines, Samoa, the Solomon Islands, Sulawesi, and Vanuatu.
