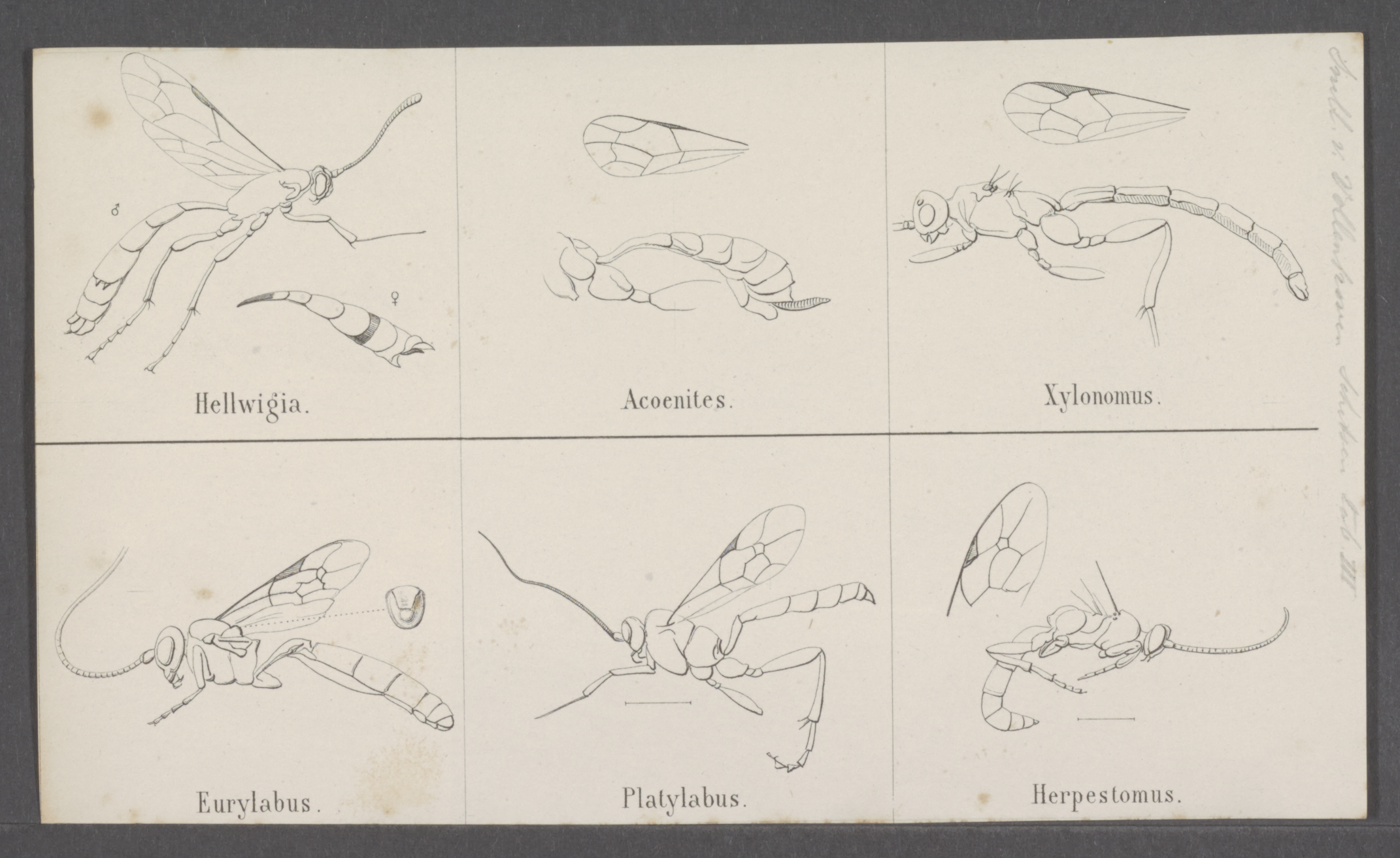
- top, left - Hellwigia sp.

Scientific classification
- Kingdom: Animalia
- Phylum: Arthropoda
- Clade: Pancrustacea
- Class: Insecta
- Order: Hymenoptera
- Family: Ichneumonidae
- Subfamily: Ophioninae
- Genus: Hellwigia; Gravenhorst, 1823

Species
- Hellwigia elegans; Hellwigia obscura; Hellwigia obsoleta

= Hellwigia (wasp) =

Genus of wasps

Hellwigia is a genus of ichneumonid wasps. A specimen of the species was reared by scientists for the first time in the Netherlands. Though formerly considered part of the subfamily Campopleginae, phylogenetic research has since transferred the genus to Ophioninae.
