= Alleppey green cardamom =

Variety of cardamom

Alleppey Green Cardamom
- Geographical indication
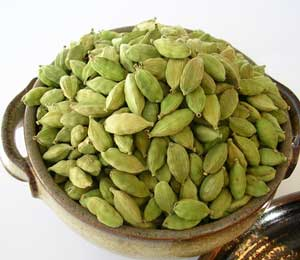
- Description: Cardamom grown in southern Western Ghats
- Type: Agricultural
- Area: Southern Kerala; Western and Southern Tamil Nadu
- Country: India
- Registered: 2007–08

Alleppey Green Cardamom is a variety of cardamom that originated from the present day of the Indian state of Kerala. The area of production of this variety of cardamom spans across Southern Kerala, Western and Southern Tamil Nadu along the Western Ghats. It finds mention in ancient Hindu texts and is one of the spices traded since antiquity.

== History ==
The spice is mentioned in ancient Hindu texts such as Arthashastra, Susruta Samhita and Charaka Samhita. In the fourth century BCE, it was traded with the Greeks. It later formed part of the spice trade with ancient Romans, Arabs and other European kingdoms later. In 18th century, Travancore kingdom had monopoly over trade and export of cardamom in an understanding with the British Raj. This made all produce of cardamom in Travancore to be sold solely to the state depot at Alleppey, which was the main trading port. This cardamom variety is called Alleppey cardamom not because it's grown in Alleppey rather it's because it was the main depot through which this cardamom was processed.

== Cultivation ==
The crop is cultivated across the southern slopes of the Western Ghats at altitudes ranging from 800–1,300 m (2,600–4,300 ft). It grows in sandy loam or clay loam soil with pH less than seven. The plant grows up to 3 m (9.8 ft) tall. It is a rainfed crop, usually grown during the South-west monsoon season in July to September. The seeds are planted during the monsoon and the seeds germinate after five to seven weeks. The plants start bearing capsules in about three years after planting. Flowering commences during April-May and the fruits mature in about four months. The capsules are harvested during October-November and can be done multiple times in a single season.

The area of production of this variety of cardamom spans across Southern Kerala, Western and Southern Tamil Nadu along the Western Ghats. It was one of the spices traded with Arabs, and later with Europeans.

== Description ==
It is one of the oldest and popular varieties of cardamom. It consists of mature unripened and dried fruits of Elettaria cardamomum plants of Alpinioideae sub-family. The spice is light green in color with three cornered capsule and wrinkled appearance. On average, it measures 21 mm (0.83 in) in length and 8 mm (0.31 in) in diameter. It has a pleasant sweet flavor with a fruity odor. The flavor is due to the presence of Terpinyl acetate, cineole, Linalool and Linalyl acetate. Because of its high oil content, it is used for oil production which is used as a aromatic oil and disinfectant.

== Production ==
The harvested capsules are rinsed in running water. The cleaned capsules are dried on kilns to reduce the moisture content. The capsules can be dried naturally under the sun or using artificial methods. The dried capsules are separated into grades based on different parameters such as weight, size, color and odor. The cardamom is usually light green in color but might turn brown if the drying process is delayed after harvesting. It is usually stored in gunny bags at higher temperatures of up to 65 °C (149 °F) with ventilation to prevent moisture accumulation.

== Geographical indication ==
It was declared as a Geographical indication in 2007–08. The application for registration was made by Spices Board, Ministry of Commerce and Industry, Government of India.
