= Hellwigia nutans =

Scientific classification
- Kingdom: Plantae
- Clade: Tracheophytes
- Clade: Angiosperms
- Clade: Monocots
- Clade: Commelinids
- Order: Zingiberales
- Family: Zingiberaceae
- Genus: Hellwigia
- Species: H. nutans

Binomial name
- Hellwigia nutans (L.) Senjaya & A.D.Poulsen

Synonyms
- Alpinia molucana Gagnep.; Alpinia nutans (L.) Roscoe; Catimbium nutans (L.) Juss. ex T.Lestib.; Globba nutans L.; Globba sylvestris Rumph. ex Dum.Cours.; Tonemone malukuana C.K.Lim, nom. illeg. superfl.; Tonemone nutans (L.) C.K.Lim

Species of flowering plant

Hellwigia nutans is a species of flowering plant in the family Zingiberaceae, native to the Maluku Islands. It was first described by Carl Linnaeus in 1771 as Globba nutans. In 1806, William Roscoe transferred it to the genus Alpinia, where it remained until 2025, when a molecular phylogenetic study led to the re-establishment of Hellwigia as an independent genus including this species, a change accepted by Plants of the World Online as of September 2026.
