= Hellwigia papuana =

Scientific classification
- Kingdom: Plantae
- Clade: Tracheophytes
- Clade: Angiosperms
- Clade: Monocots
- Clade: Commelinids
- Order: Zingiberales
- Family: Zingiberaceae
- Genus: Hellwigia
- Species: H. papuana

Binomial name
- Hellwigia papuana (Scheff.) Senjaya & A.D.Poulsen

Synonyms
- Alpinia colossea K.Schum.; Alpinia eustales K.Schum.; Alpinia papuana Scheff.

Species of flowering plant

Hellwigia papuana is a species of flowering plant in the family Zingiberaceae, native to western New Guinea. It was first described in 1876 as Alpinia papuana.
