= Abar Khabo =

Sweet dish from West Bengal

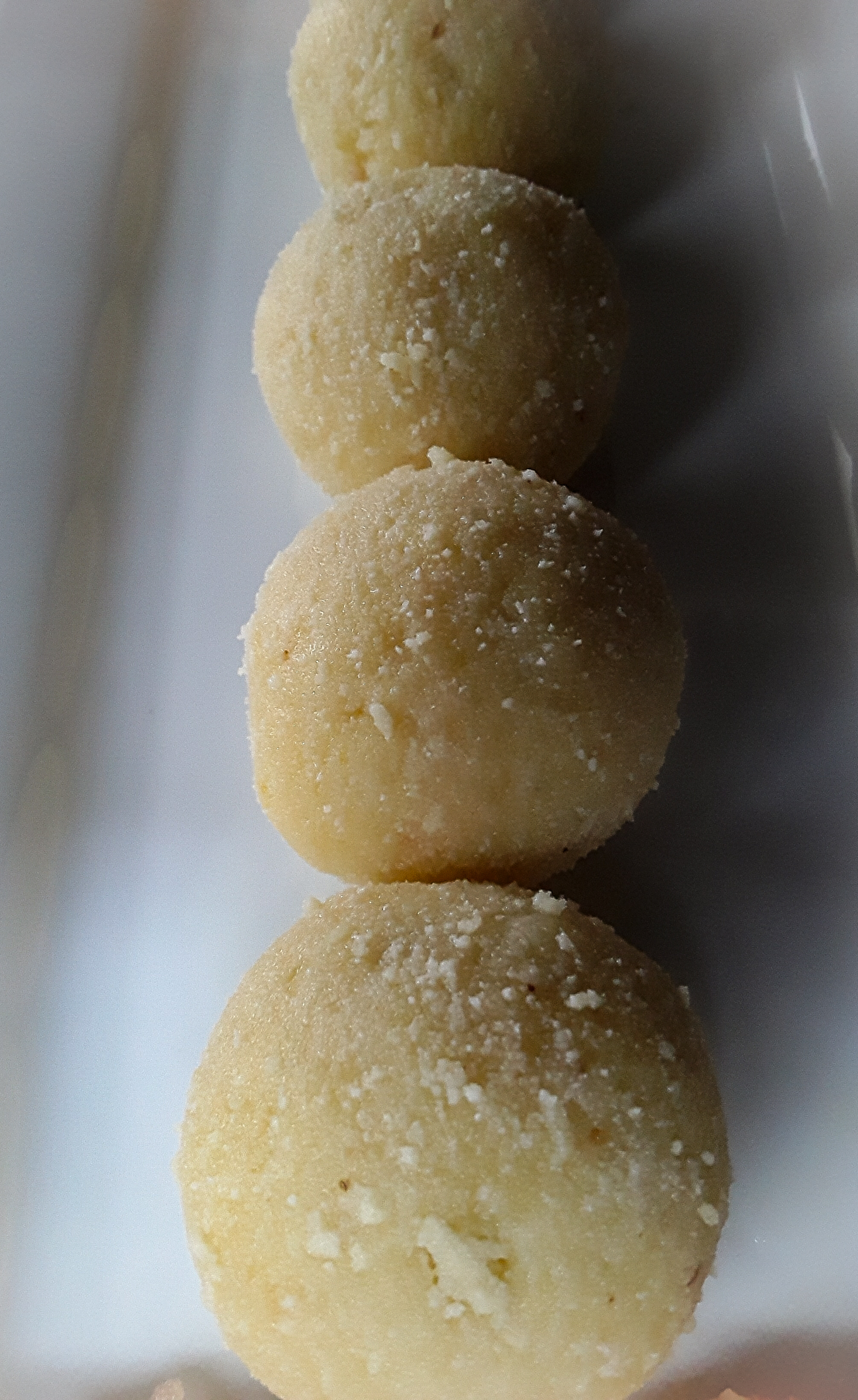
- Abar Khabo Sandesh
- Place of origin: India
- Region or state: Calcutta, West Bengal
- Created by: Nobin Chandra Das
- Serving temperature: normal temperature
- Main ingredients: Kheer

Abar Khabo (English: Eat Again) is a sweet originating in West Bengal that consists of two concentric spheres containing pistachios, cashews, raisins and kheer.

== History ==
Abar khabo was invented by Nobin Chandra Das when requested by the Maharani Swarnamoyee Devi of Cossimbazar to create a new kind of sweet. Upon eating the abar khabo the Maharani exclaimed "আবার খাবো" (Abar Khabo) which became its name.

Kolkata-based sweet shops of the Gupta Brothers and Bhim Chandra Nag are known for making abar khabo.

== See also ==
- Rasgulla
