= Lyangcha =

Indian sweet

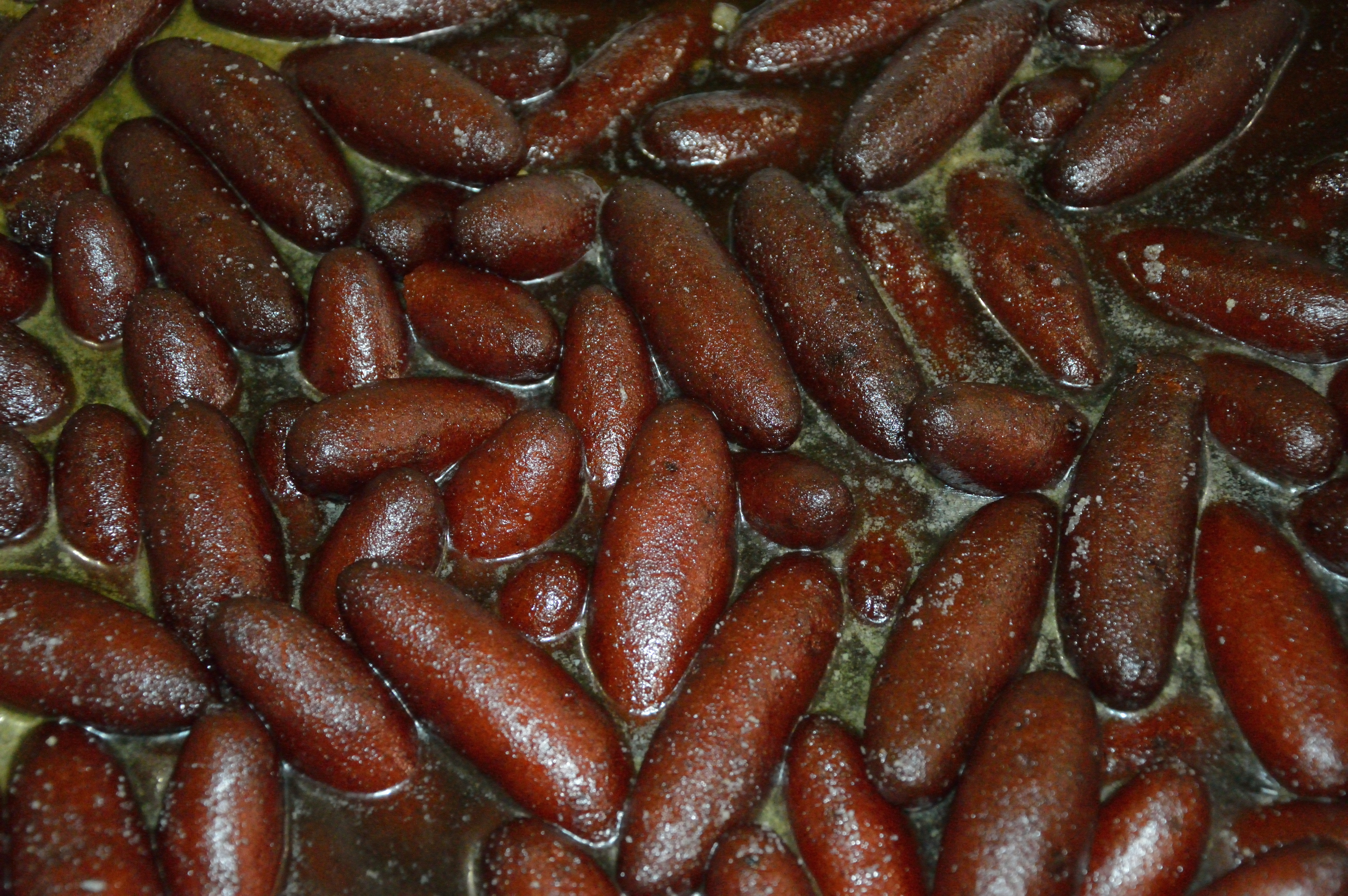
- Langcha from Saktigarh
- Course: Dessert
- Place of origin: Bangladesh and West Bengal
- Region or state: Jharkhand, Bengal, Odisha, Assam, Bihar, Tripura
- Associated cuisine: Bengali cuisine
- Main ingredients: Flour, milk solids, ghee, sugar

Lyangcha, Langcha or Lemcha, is an Indian sweet dish prepared in West Bengal, Jharkhand, Odisha, Bihar, Assam, Tripura and Bangladesh. It is made from flour and milk powder by frying it and dipping it into sugar syrup for a long time. The origin of the sweet is in Bardhaman, West Bengal, India. The Government of West Bengal has begun the process of registering Geographical indication (GI) for Lyangcha.

== Preparation ==
Traditionally, lyangcha is made from khoya (a form of solid milk). But due to the unavailability of khoya at times, often milk powder is used instead of it.

Lyancha is made from flour, milk powder. The flour and milk powder is mixed thoroughly with soda and water and made into a dough. Ghee is added making the dough at constant intervals. Mixed well, the dough is kept untouched for few hours. Then the dough is divided into cylindrical shaped pieces with hand. The cylindrical pieces are then deep-fried in oil until a brown crust is formed around and they turn stiff and hard. The fried cylindrical pieces are then boiled into the sugar syrup. Once done, they are brought back to a tub containing cold rose-flavored or elaichi flavored sugar syrup. Kept for few hours untouched, these hard pieces become soft and juicy, ready to be served on the plates.

== History ==
The origin of the delicacy is said to be in the towns of Burdwan, in West Bengal, India. The genesis of lyangcha actually goes back to a sweet maker in Burdwan (a district in West Bengal) who used to make Pantua (fried sweetmeat made of flour and milk solids dipped in sugar syrup) of huge sizes. Lyangcha – a sweetmeat in popular parlance – was created by the sweet makers of the region in Bengal.

According to local stories, the credit of lyangcha goes to a sweet maker named Lyangcha Dutta of Saktigarh. The noted novelist Narayan Sanyal in his novel Rupamanjari actually tells a story. Goutam Dhoni, a journalist and correspondent of Ekdin a Bengali Daily, tells another tale about Nikhuti (a sweet famous in Krishnanagar). In his latest article in Nadia Darpan (a local Bengali Daily) Dhoni brings to our attention how Lyangcha has travelled from Krishananagar ( a town in Nadia District) to Burdwan and Shaktigarh. The genesis of Lyangcha actually goes back to the matrimony alliance between the two superpower kings in two different districts of present-day West Bengal. A matrimonial alliance between the royal families of Krishnanagar and Burdwan changed the genesis of Lyangcha.

The story goes that the princess from the then Krishnanagar royal household was married to the prince of the Burdwan royal household. When she became pregnant she lost her appetite and refused to eat any food. She continued this for a long time even though she was requested to break her fast and even medical treatments were started. During this time, she expressed a desire to eat lyangcha – a sweetmeat that artisans from her maternal home used to prepare.

The then ruler of Krishnanagar made arrangements to find out who prepared lyangcha but none of the Modaks/ Moiras (The Bengali confectioner) in Krishnanagar were little familiar to lyangcha. Apparently, even the lady did not remember the name of the sweet. She had mentioned Langcha because the sweet maker who used to prepare this specific sweetmeat could not walk properly (in Bengali, Langcha means the one who limps). Then the sweet maker was called forth to the ruler of Krishnanagar in Krishnagar court, he was immediately sent off to Burdwan. He was given lands and other properties to settle in Burdwan so that he could prepare delicacies for the royalty. Currently, Shaktigarh, Burdwan district of Bengal, is credited with huge lyangchas, but the shops in Krishnanagar take a special pride in how Langcha has travelled from Krishnanagar to Burdwan.

== Places famous for the dessert ==
Burdwan, a town in West Bengal is extremely famous for its lyangcha. Dipped in sweet sugar syrup, this serves as one of the most popular items in the dessert list of common people. Tarapith, a small village in West Bengal known for its Ma Tara temple, is also famous for its lyangcha. The large sized lyangchas made from flour and Khoya add to the sweetness of Bengal. Starting from 10 rupees to a hundred rupees each for the largest sized one (about 3 feet), these sweets are the second most attractive elements after the temples.

The most famous region of Lyangcha is Shaktigarh, the birthplace of the sweet itself. There are many shops selling those sweets along NH 19. Worldwide famous for its sweet, Shaktigarh has created its own name and history in the art of dessert making and Indian sweets. Lyangchas are of different taste there, black in color, fried more deeply and much sweeter than the ones found in any other parts of Bengal. These are also banana-shaped instead of cylindrical.

Places like Kolkata, the capital of West Bengal, are also famous for its lyangchas as like any other sweet in the metro city. Other cities like Bhubaneshwar the capital of Orissa is also famous for its sweets. Puri, Nimpada are other places in East India which is known to people for its lyangcha. The sweet is also known internationally, as cities of Europe and the US that have Indian sweet shops also sell it.

The government of West Bengal has considered creating a Lyangcha Hub in Shaktigarh, the birthplace of lyangcha, to spread this to the world and make foreign exports to earn revenue.

== Similar dishes ==
- Gulab jamun, pantua, ledikeni and Chhena Jhili are similar dishes
- Nikhuti is a similar dish but smaller in size; it is often used as offerings to deities or to garnish another dessert
