= Saktigarh, Bardhaman =

Saktigarh
- Village
- Location in West Bengal, India
- Coordinates: 23.21°N 87.96°E
- Country: India
- State: West Bengal
- District: Purba Bardhaman
- Elevation: 23 m (75 ft)

Population (2011)
  - Total: 8,432

Languages
  - Official: Bengali, English
- Time zone: UTC+5:30 (IST)
- PIN: 713149
- Telephone code: 91 342
- Vehicle registration: WB 42
- Website: purbabardhaman.gov.in

Saktigarh is a village in Burdwan II CD block in Bardhaman Sadar North subdivision of Purba Bardhaman district in the Indian state of West Bengal.

== Geography ==
Cities and towns in the Bardhaman Sadar North subdivision of Purba Bardhaman district
M: municipal city/ town, CT: census town, R: rural/ urban centre, H: historical site, W: river project, C: craft centre
Owing to space constraints in the small map, the actual locations in a larger map may vary slightly

=== Location ===
Saktigarh is located at 23.21°N 87.96°E

Saktigarh is part of the Bardhaman Plain, the central plain area of the district. The area is surrounded by the Bhagirathi on the east, the Ajay on the north-west and the Damodar on the west and south. Old river channels and small creeks found in the region dry up in the dry season, but the Bardhaman Plains are sometimes subject to heavy floods during the rainy season. The region has recent alluvial soils.

=== Urbanisation ===
73.58% of the population of Bardhaman Sadar North subdivision lives in the rural areas. Only 26.42% of the population lives in the urban areas, and that is the highest proportion of urban population amongst the four subdivisions in Purba Bardhaman district. The map alongside presents some of the notable locations in the subdivision. All places marked in the map are linked in the larger full screen map.

=== Police station ===
There is a police station at Saktigarh.

== Demographics ==
As per the 2011 Census of India Saktigarh had a total population of 8,432, of which 4,252 (50%) were males and 4,180 (50%) were females. Population below 6 years was 913. The total number of literates in Saktigarh was 5,730 (76.21% of the population over 6 years).

== Transport ==
Saktigarh railway station is the railway junction of the Howrah-Bardhaman chord and main lines. It is 83 kilometres (52 mi) from Howrah Station via chord and 96 kilometres (60 mi) via main line. It is 12 kilometres (7.5 mi) from Bardhaman. It is part of Kolkata Suburban Railway system.

It is located on Grand Trunk Road and the newly constructed NH 19 (old numbering NH 2) bypasses the town. There is a regular bus-service between Barsul, Memari, Jamalpur to Bardhaman via Saktigarh. The service is in high demand and many people prefer this route to railways while coming here from Bardhaman.

== Education ==
Saktigarh Safdar Hashmi High School, a coeducational institution, is affiliated with the West Bengal Board of Secondary Education. It is also affiliated with West Bengal Council of Higher Secondary Education.

== Culture ==
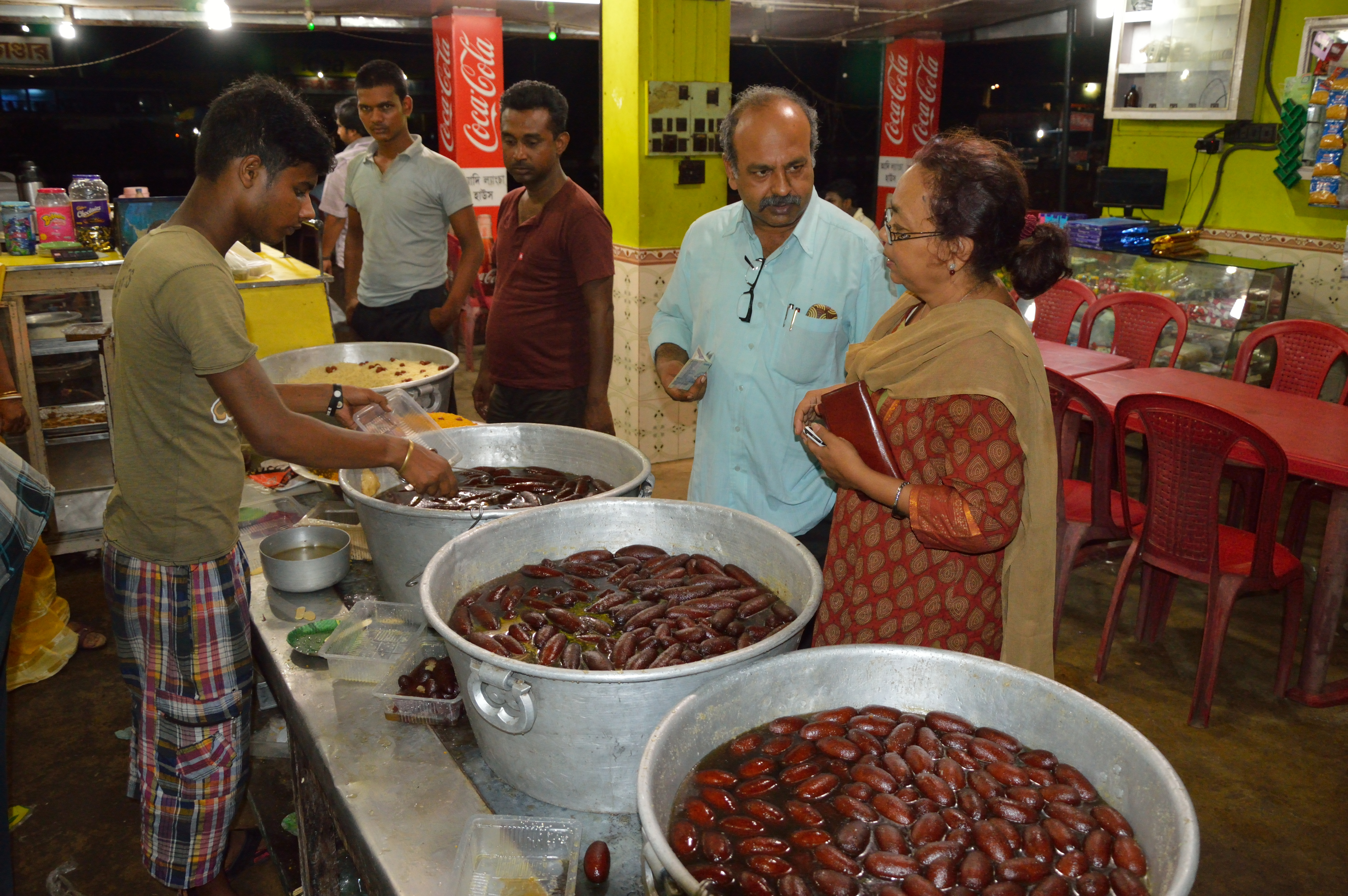
A langcha shop in Saktigarh

Saktigarh is famous for the sweet langcha. There are shops selling those dark-red sweets along NH 19.
