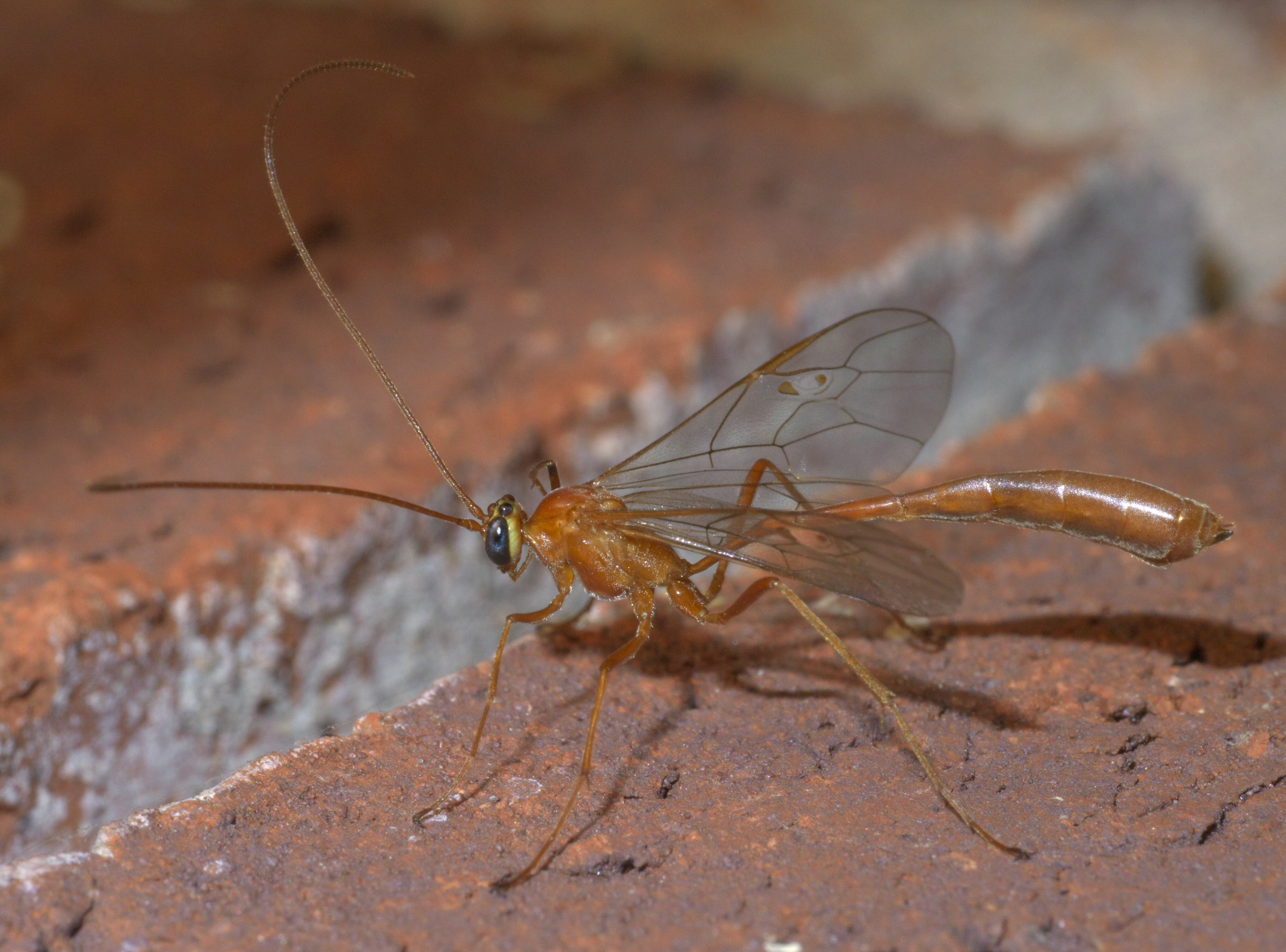
- Enicospilus purgatus

Scientific classification
- Kingdom: Animalia
- Phylum: Arthropoda
- Clade: Pancrustacea
- Class: Insecta
- Order: Hymenoptera
- Family: Ichneumonidae
- Subfamily: Ophioninae
- Tribe: Enicospilini
- Genus: Enicospilus; Stephens, 1835

= Enicospilus =

Genus of wasps

Enicospilus is a genus of large Ichneumonidae wasps. They are unusual for wasps in that they fly at night and can be found near porch lights. While these wasps resemble crane flies with long legs and long, thin bodies, the presence of two sets of wings distinguishes them from the single pair of wings of Diptera (true flies including crane flies). There are almost 700 described species of Enicospilus. They are larval parasitoids of various large moths, including Lasiocampidae, Noctuidae and Saturniidae.

== Selected species ==
- Enicospilus adek (Gauld, 1985)
- Enicospilus cameronii (Dalla Torre, 1901)
- Enicospilus chaconi Gauld, 1988
- Enicospilus seminiger (Szepligeti, 1906)
- Enicospilus xeris Gauld & Mitchell, 1981
- Enicospilus yezoensis (Uchida, 1928)
- Enicospilus zebrus Gauld & Mitchell, 1981
- Enicospilus echeverri (Galud, 1988)
- Enicospilus camerunensis (Enderlein, 1921)
