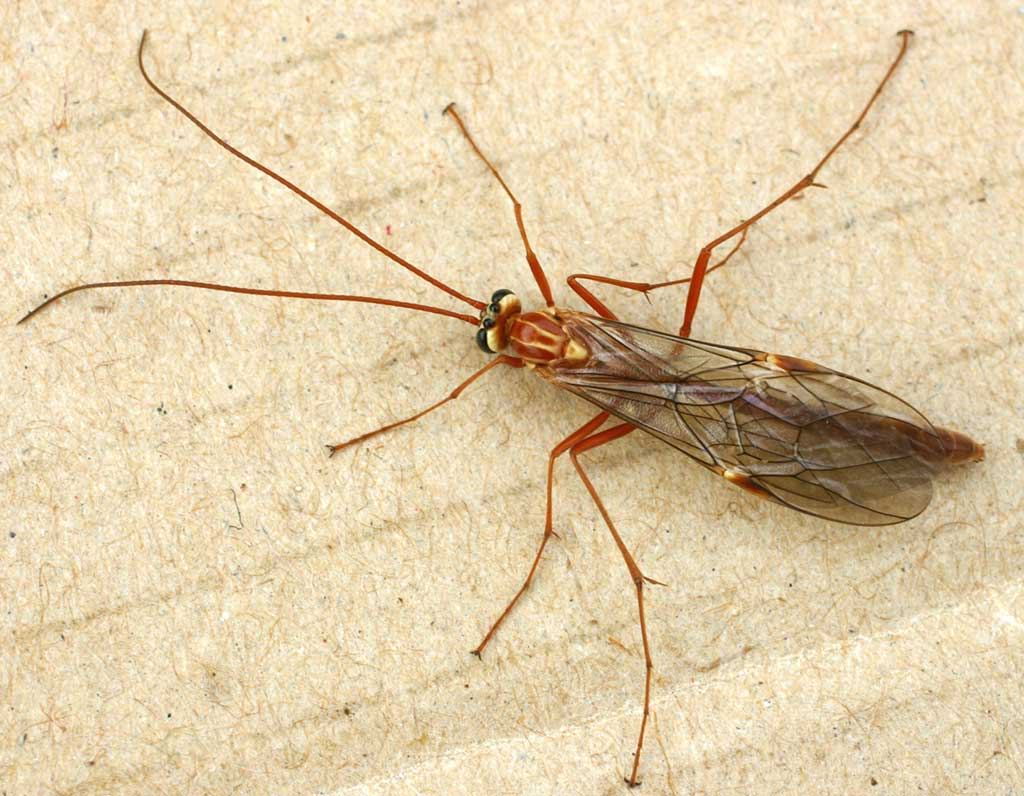
- Ophion luteus

Scientific classification
- Kingdom: Animalia
- Phylum: Arthropoda
- Clade: Pancrustacea
- Class: Insecta
- Order: Hymenoptera
- Family: Ichneumonidae
- Subfamily: Ophioninae

Tribes
- Ophionini; Enicospilini; Thyreodonini

= Ophioninae =

Subfamily of wasps

Ophioninae is a cosmopolitan subfamily of Ichneumonidae, comprising 33 genera and exhibiting high diversity in tropical regions. They are primarily koinobiont endoparasitoids of larval Lepidoptera, although at least one species parasitizes Scarabaeidae (Coleoptera). Pupae of Ophioninae are ovoid and feature a distinct central pale band, which is a characteristic trait of this subfamily. These insects are typically large, slender, and orange, with compressed and curved abdomens. They possess prominent ocelli and are primarily active during the night, often being attracted to light sources.

== Genera ==
Rousse et al. classified 13 of the genera of Ophioninae between 3 tribes, with the remaining genera unplaced to a tribe. The possibility of erecting a fourth tribe for the derived genera Hellwigia and Skiapus was also presented tentatively.

=== Tribe Enicospilini ===
- Dicamptus Szépligeti, 1905
- Enicospilus Stephens, 1835
- Hellwigiella Szépligeti, 1905
- Laticoleus Townes, 1973

=== Tribe Ophionini ===
- Alophophion Cushman, 1947
- Afrophion Gauld, 1979
- Ophion Fabricius, 1798 - paraphyletic
- Rhopalophion Seyrig, 1935
- Sclerophion Gauld, 1979
- Xylophion Gauld, 1979

=== Tribe Thyreodonini ===
- Dictyonotus Kriechbaumer, 1894
- Rhynchophion Enderlein, 1912
- Thyreodon Brullé, 1846

=== Tribe incertae sedis ===
- Agathophiona Westwood, 1882
- Barytatocephalus Schulz, 1895
- Eremotylus Förster, 1869
- Euryophion Cameron, 1906
- Heinrichiella Hedwig, 1949
- Hellwigia Gravenhorst, 1823
- Janzophion Gauld, 1985
- Lepiscelus Townes, 1971
- Leptophion Cameron, 1901
- Nyxia Johansson, 2021
- Ophiogastrella Brues, 1912
- Orientospilus Morley, 1912
- Pamophion Gauld, 1977
- Prethophion Townes, 1971
- Riekophion Gauld, 1977
- Sicophion Gauld, 1979
- Simophion Cushman, 1947
- Skiapus Morley, 1917
- Stauropoctonus Brauns, 1889
- Trophophion Cushman, 1947
