= Viosa =

Viosa may refer to:

- Viossa, a community-created constructed language and pidgin
- Vjosa, a river in northwestern Greece and southwestern Albania
- Lampides viosa, a species of butterfly
- Víosa na Gaillimhe (Viscount Galway), a title created 4 times in the Peerage of Ireland
