= Sulettaria =

Scientific classification
- Kingdom: Plantae
- Clade: Tracheophytes
- Clade: Angiosperms
- Clade: Monocots
- Clade: Commelinids
- Order: Zingiberales
- Family: Zingiberaceae
- Subfamily: Alpinioideae
- Tribe: Alpinieae
- Genus: Sulettaria; A.D.Poulsen & Mathisen

Species
- See text

Genus of flowering plants

Sulettaria is a genus of flowering plants in the family Zingiberaceae. The species of the genus were formerly placed in the genus Elettaria until 2018.

Sulettaria are native to Malaysia and Indonesia.

- Sulettaria brachycalyx S.Sakai & Nagam. - Sarawak
- Sulettaria kapitensis S.Sakai & Nagam. - Sarawak
- Sulettaria linearicrista S.Sakai & Nagam. - Sarawak, Brunei
- Sulettaria longipilosa S.Sakai & Nagam. - Sarawak
- Sulettaria longituba (Ridl.) Holttum - Sumatra, Peninsular Malaysia
- Sulettaria multiflora (Ridl.) R.M.Sm. - Sumatra, Sarawak
- Sulettaria rubida R.M.Sm. - Sabah, Sarawak
- Sulettaria stoloniflora (K.Schum.) S.Sakai & Nagam. - Sarawak
- Sulettaria surculosa (K.Schum.) B.L.Burtt & R.M.Sm. - Sarawak
