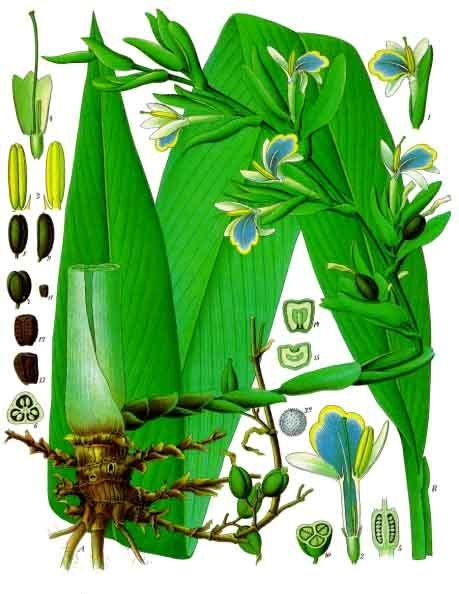
- True Cardamom (Elettaria cardamomum); 1896 illustration
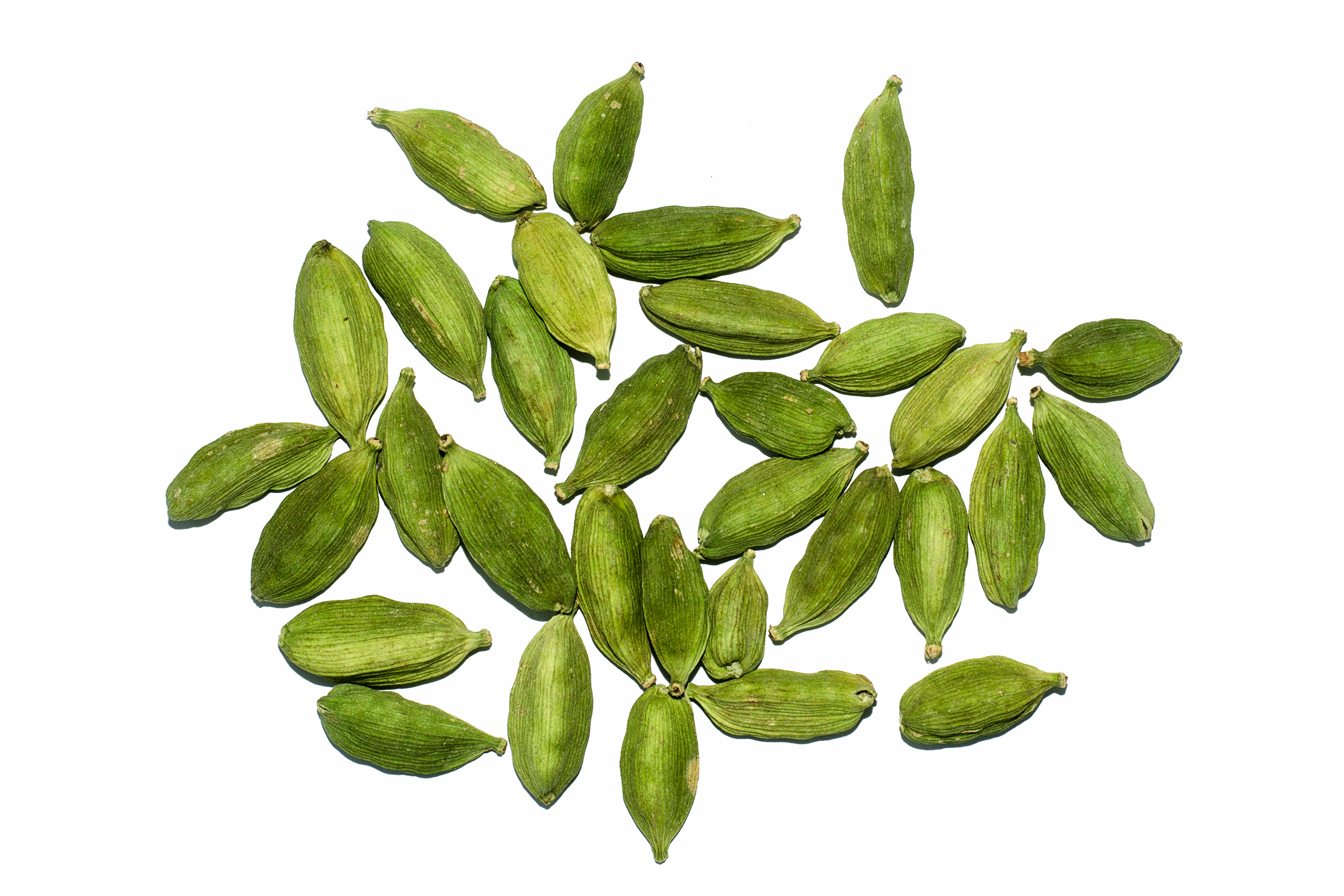

Scientific classification
- Kingdom: Plantae
- Clade: Tracheophytes
- Clade: Angiosperms
- Clade: Monocots
- Clade: Commelinids
- Order: Zingiberales
- Family: Zingiberaceae
- Subfamily: Alpinioideae
- Tribe: Alpinieae
- Genus: Elettaria; Maton, 1811

Synonyms
- Cardamomum Noronha; Matonia Stephenson & J.M.Churchill

= Elettaria =

Genus of plants

Elettaria is a genus of flowering plants in the family Zingiberaceae. They are native to India and Sri Lanka, but cultivated and naturalized elsewhere. One member of the genus, E. cardamomum, known as green cardamom or true cardamom, is a commercially important spice used as a flavouring agent in many countries.

In 2018, several species were removed from Elettaria and placed in a new genus called Sulettaria. These species are recognized as of October 2018: A phylogenetic analysis published in 2024 found that Elettaria was a well-defined clade of seven species native to India and Sri Lanka, which is sister to the African genus Aframomum and the African and Neotropical genus Renealmia, and distinct from the Sri Lankan genera Cyphostigma and Srilankanthus.

== Species ==
Seven species are accepted.

- Elettaria cardamomum (L.) Maton - India
- Elettaria ensal (Gaertn.) Abeyw. - Sri Lanka
- Elettaria facifera M.Sabu & Škorničk.
- Elettaria floribunda Thwaites
- Elettaria involucrata Thwaites
- Elettaria rufescens Thwaites
- Elettaria tulipifera M.Sabu & Škorničk.

=== Formerly placed here ===
These former species from Malaysia and Indonesia were reclassified into Sulettaria in 2018:

- Elettaria brachycalyx S.Sakai & Nagam. - Sarawak
- Elettaria kapitensis S.Sakai & Nagam. - Sarawak
- Elettaria linearicrista S.Sakai & Nagam. - Sarawak, Brunei
- Elettaria longipilosa S.Sakai & Nagam. - Sarawak
- Elettaria longituba (Ridl.) Holttum - Sumatra, Peninsular Malaysia
- Eulettaria multiflora (Ridl.) R.M.Sm. - Sumatra, Sarawak
- Elettaria rubida R.M.Sm. - Sabah, Sarawak
- Elettaria stoloniflora (K.Schum.) S.Sakai & Nagam. - Sarawak
- Elettaria surculosa (K.Schum.) B.L.Burtt & R.M.Sm. - Sarawak

Elettaria nemoralis is now accepted as Srilankanthus nemoralis, the sole species in genus Srilankanthus.
