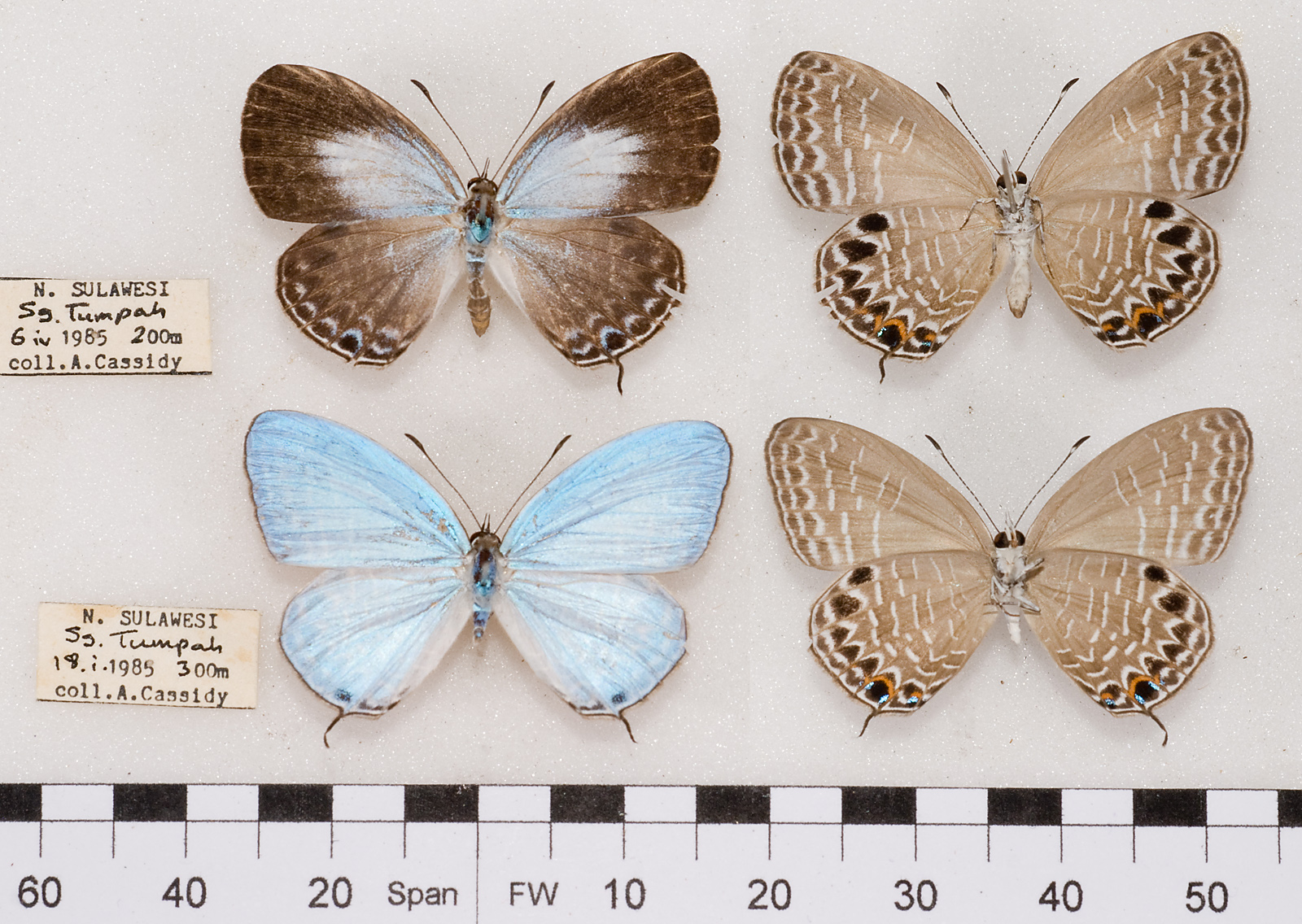
- J. c. zelea

Scientific classification
- Domain: Eukaryota
- Kingdom: Animalia
- Phylum: Arthropoda
- Class: Insecta
- Order: Lepidoptera
- Family: Lycaenidae
- Genus: Jamides
- Species: J. cyta

Binomial name
- Jamides cyta (Boisduval, [1832])

Synonyms
- Catochrysops cyta Boisduval, [1832]; Lampides amphissina var. malaguna Ribbe, 1899; Catochrysops cyta amphissa C. & R. Felder, 1860; Lampides viosa Fruhstorfer, 1915; Lampides amphissina Grose-Smith, 1894; Lampides philatus amphissina Grose-Smith; Seitz, [1923]; Plebeius amphissa var. aruanus Röber, [1886]; Lampides courvoisieri Fruhstorfer, 1915; Pepliophorus claudia Waterhouse & Lyell, 1914; Lampides hellada Fruhstorfer, 1915; Jamides lamax Riley, 1945; Lampides leiothrix Fruhstorfer, 1915; Lampides cyta lividus Druce, 1895; Lampides madara Fruhstorfer, 1915; Lampides cyta margarita Martin, 1895; Lampides megdora Fruhstorfer, 1915; Lycaena nemea C. Felder, 1860; Cupido nemea (Felder); Kirby, 1871; Plebeius callinicus Röber, 1886; Lampides nemea; Lampides vardusia Fruhstorfer, 1915; Lampides amphissa zelea Fruhstorfer, 1915; Lampides cyta zelia

= Jamides cyta =

Species of butterfly

Jamides cyta, the pale cerulean, is a butterfly of the lycaenids or blues family. It is found throughout South-east Asia, from Malaysia to the Solomon Islands and the Philippines, as well as Queensland in Australia.

The wingspan is about 30 mm. Adult males are pale blue on top. Females are similar but the forewings have black wing tips and margins, and each hindwing has a subterminal arc of black spots. The underside of both sexes is grey with several arcs of white dashes, and the females often have a white patch under each forewing.

The larvae feed on the flower buds, flowers and fruit of Syzygium puberulum. Other recorded food plants are Eugenia, Elettaria (including E. cardomomum) and Kaempferia species (including K. pandurata). They are brown with a dark brown head and thorax. They are covered in dense fine hairs.

== Subspecies ==
- J. c. cyta (New Ireland, New Hanover)
- J. c. amphissa C. Felder and R. Felder, 1860 (Bachan, Halmahera)
- J. c. amphissina Grose-Smith, 1894 (West Irian: Humboldt Bay)
- J. c. aruanus (Röber), [1886] (Aru)
- J. c. courvoisieri (Fruhstorfer, 1915) (Nias)
- J. c. claudia (Waterhouse and Lyell, 1914) (northern Queensland: Claudie River) - pale cerulean
- J. c. hellada (Fruhstorfer, 1915) (Sula Islands)
- J. c. koenigswarteri Schröder, Treadaway and Nuyda, 1993 (Philippines: Mindoro)
- J. c. lamax Riley, 1945 (Mentawi)
- J. c. leiothrix (Fruhstorfer, 1915) (Enggano)
- J. c. lividus (Druce, 1895) (Borneo)
- J. c. madara (Fruhstorfer, 1915) (Kai Island)
- J. c. margarita (Martin, 1895) (Sumatra)
- J. c. megdora (Fruhstorfer, 1915) (Obi)
- J. c. minna Riley and Corbet, 1938 (Peninsular Malaya, Burma, Thailand)
- J. c. natsumiae H.Hayashi, 1976 (Philippines: Palawan, Alibobogan)
- J. c. nemea C. Felder, 1860 (Indonesia: Maluku, Ambon)
- J. c. raddatzi Schröder and Treadaway, 1984 (Philippines: Sibuyan Island)
- J. c. vardusia (Fruhstorfer, 1915) (Java)
- J. c. zelea (Fruhstorfer, 1915) (southern Sulawesi, Banggai)

== Gallery ==
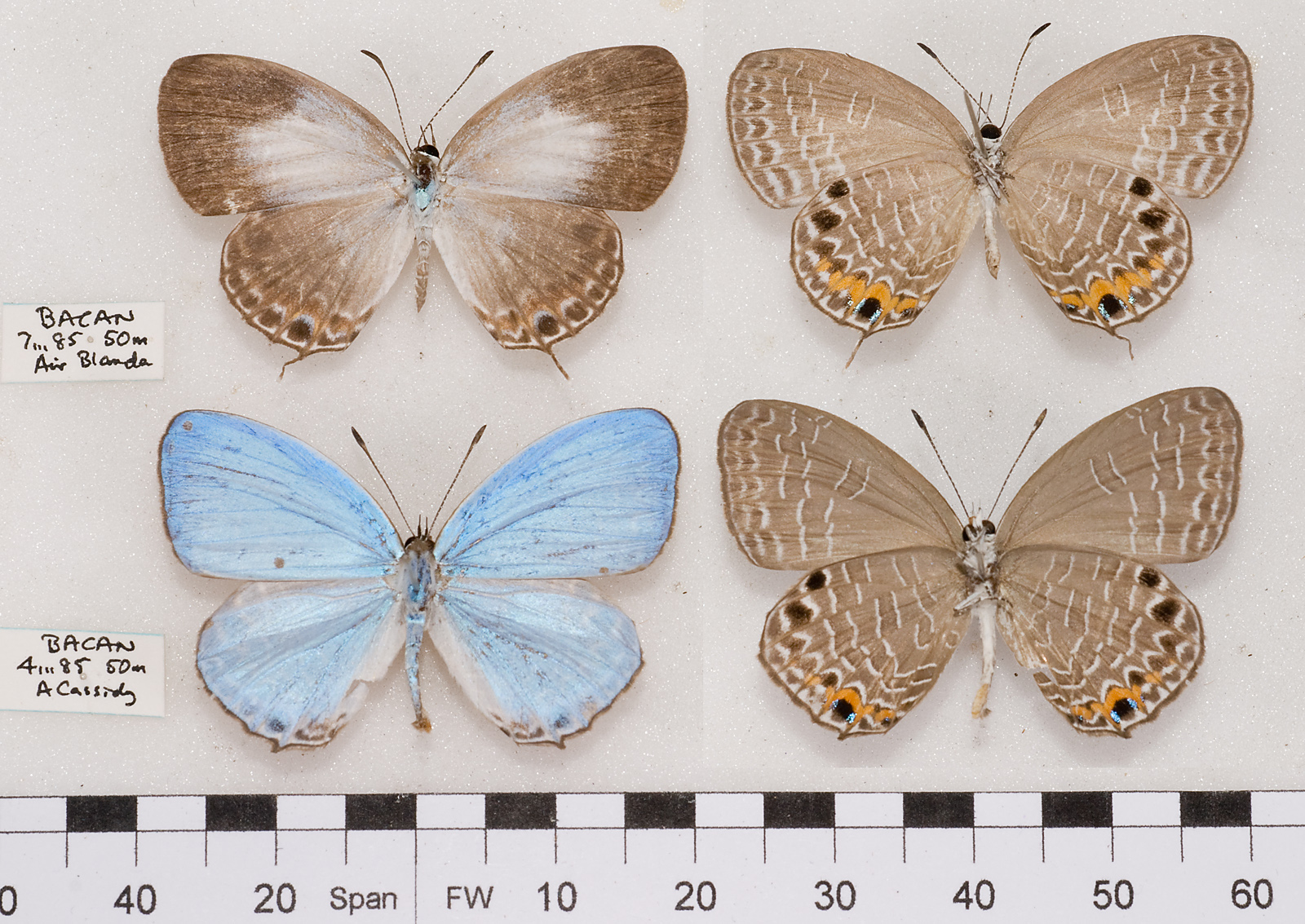
J. c. amphissa

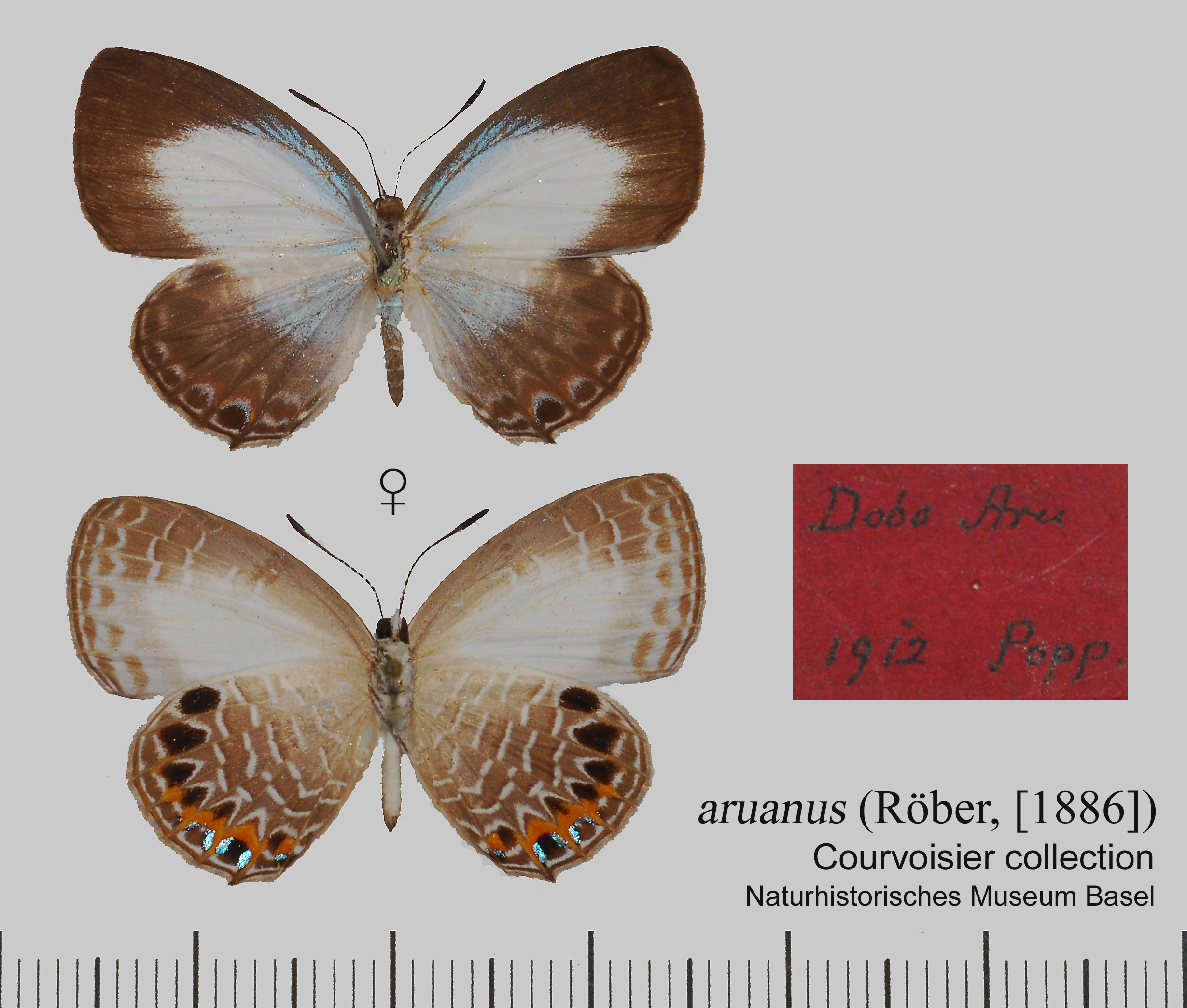
J. c. aruanus

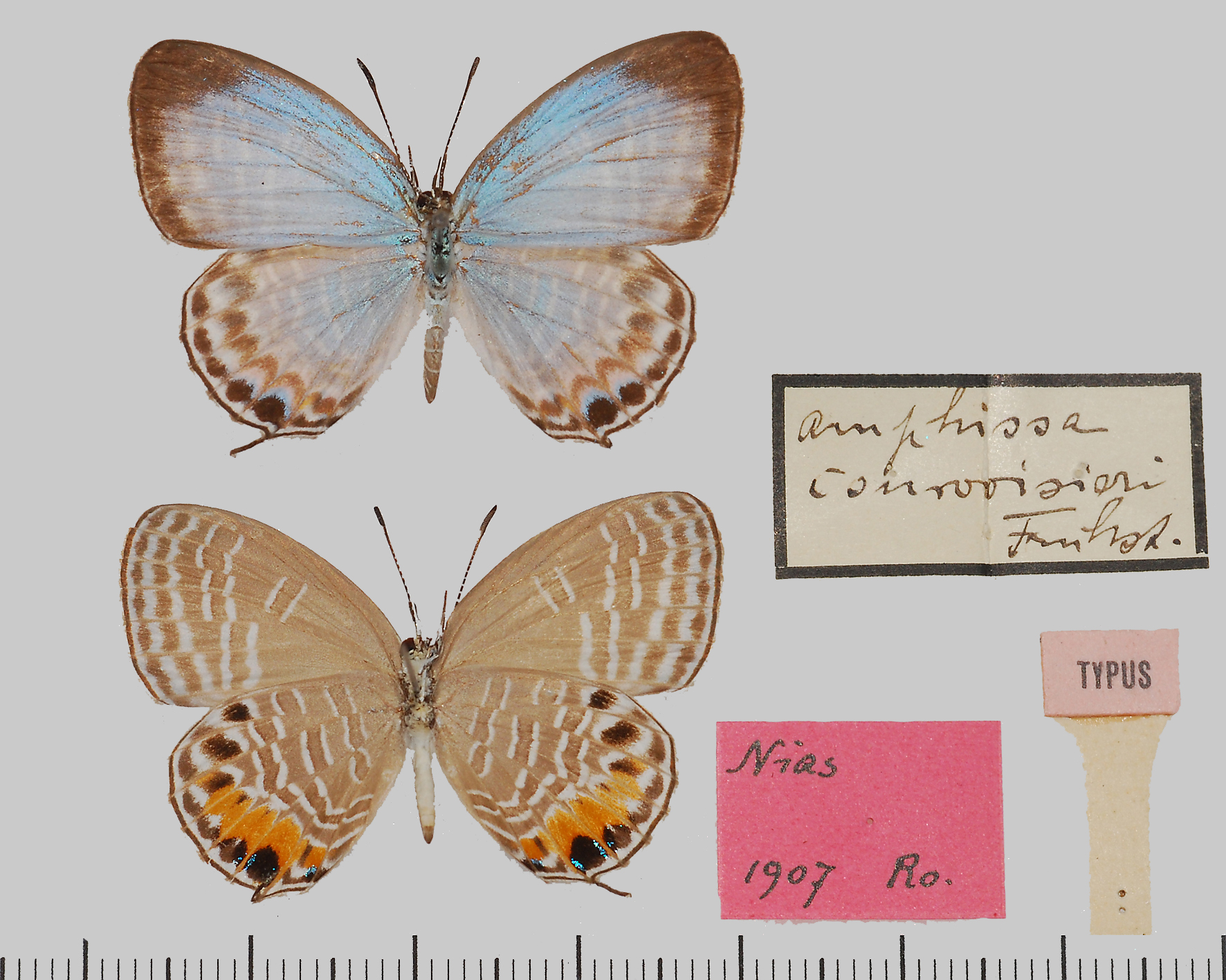
J. c. courvoisieri

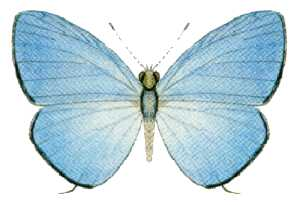
J. c. claudia

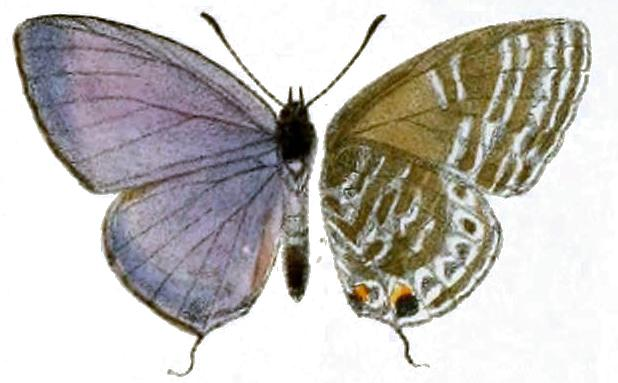
J. c. lividus

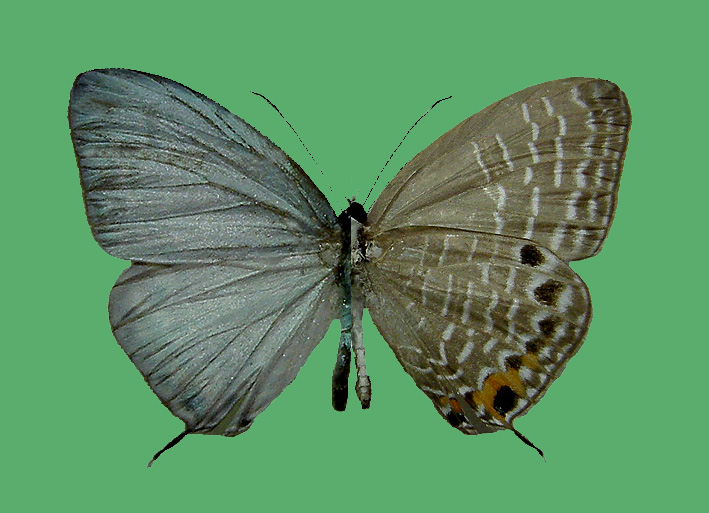
J. c. natsumiae male

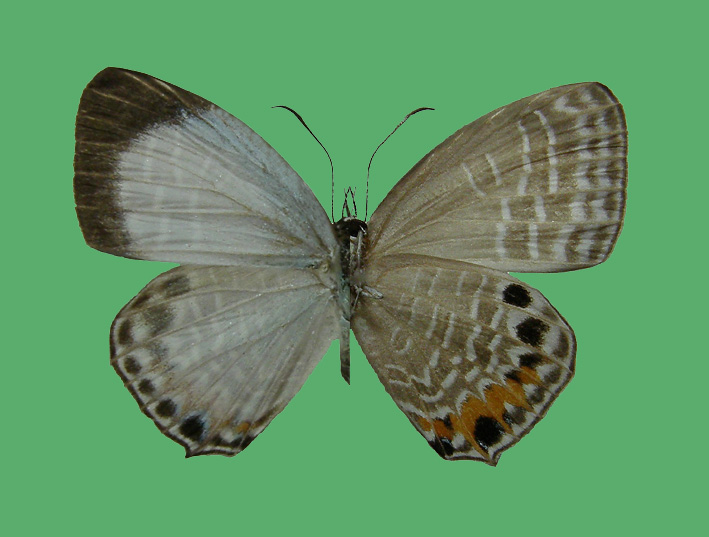
J. c. natsumiae female

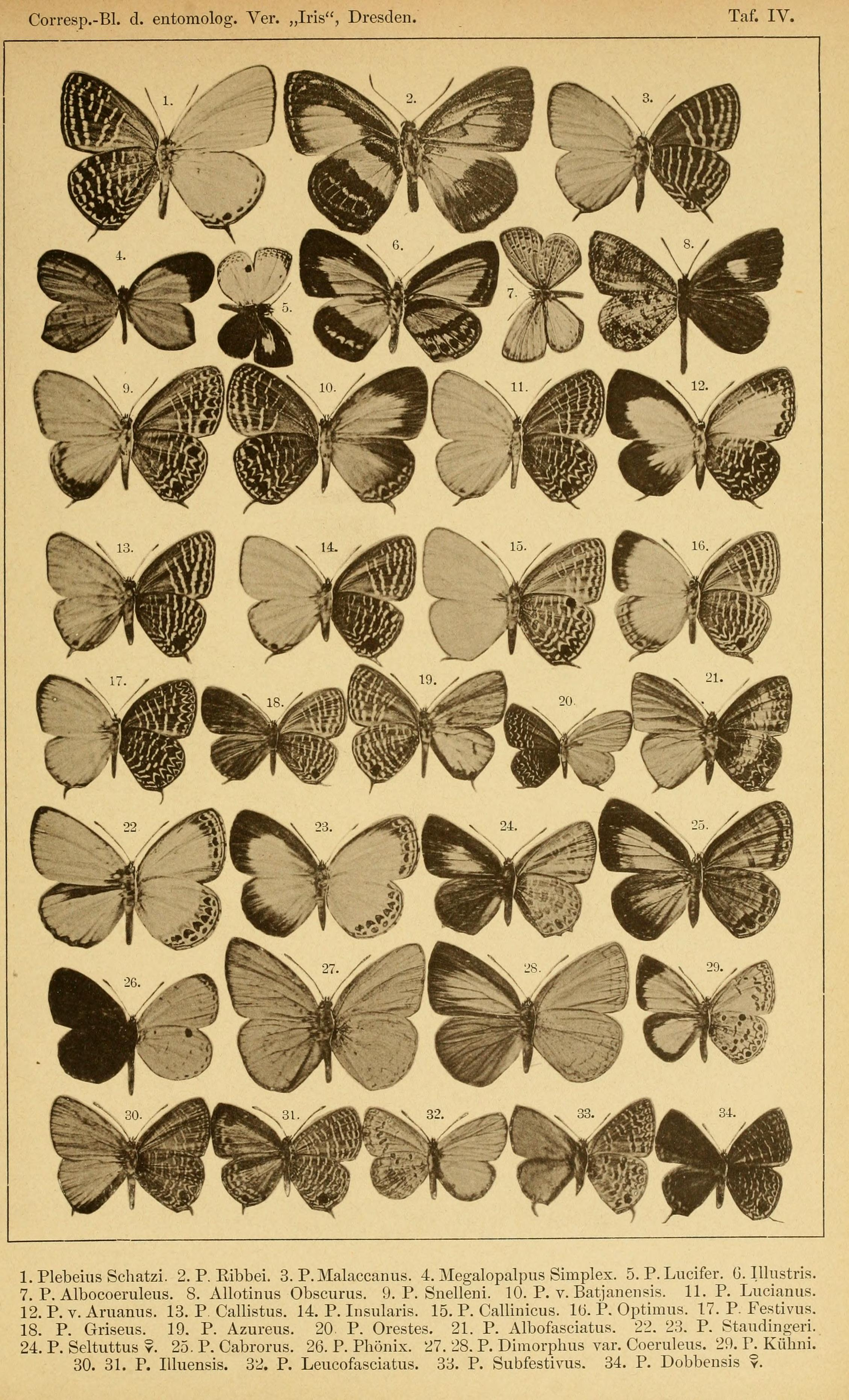
J. c. aruanus male (figure 12), J. cyta nemea as callinicus (Röber, 1886) (male figure 15), J. cyta optimus (Röber, 1886) (male figure 16), J. cyta optimus (Röber, 1886) as griseus (male figure 18)
