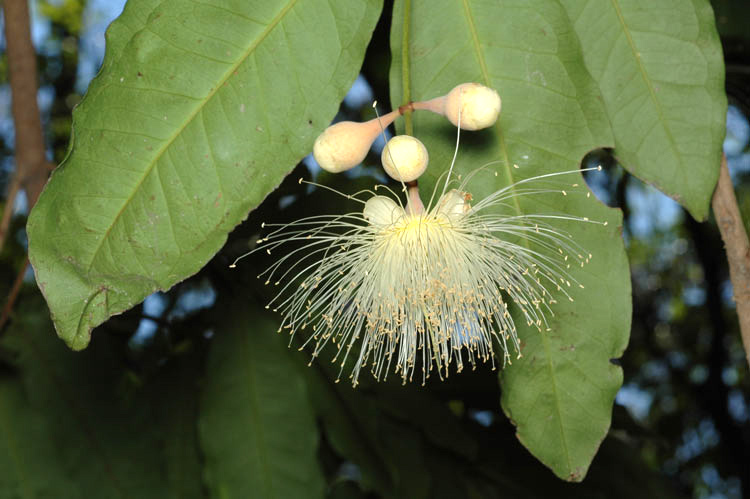
- Flowers

Conservation status
- Least Concern (NCA)
- Least Concern (IUCN 3.1)

Scientific classification
- Kingdom: Plantae
- Clade: Tracheophytes
- Clade: Angiosperms
- Clade: Eudicots
- Clade: Rosids
- Order: Myrtales
- Family: Myrtaceae
- Genus: Syzygium
- Species: S. puberulum

Binomial name
- Syzygium puberulum Merr. & L.M.Perry

= Syzygium puberulum =

white satinash

Species of flowering plant

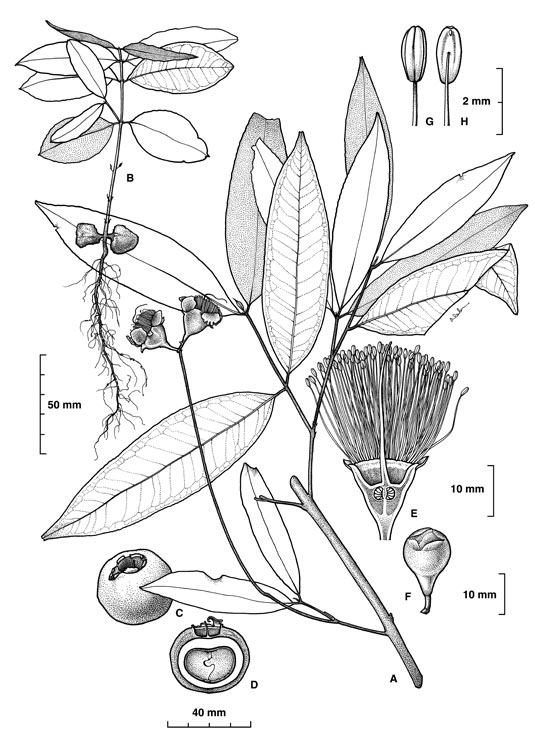
Botanic illustration

Syzygium puberulum, commonly known as white satinash or downy satinash, is a plant in the family Myrtaceae which is native to rainforests of Cape York Peninsula, Queensland, and Papua New Guinea. It was first described in 1942.

== Description ==
Syzygium puberulum is a small, evergreen, rainforest understory tree reaching up to 15 m (49 ft) high, with a trunk diameter not exceeding 30 cm (12 in) The leaves are simple and opposite, papery, dark green above and lighter below. They are held on very short petioles about 5 mm (0.20 in) long, and measure up to 19 cm (7.5 in) long by 5 cm (2.0 in) wide. They have two intramarginal veins, the outer one obscure and the inner one quite obvious, and there are about 18–22 lateral veins either side of the midrib. The leaf tip is acuminate, the base is obtuse.

The inflorescence is a pendant panicle produced either terminally, from the leaf axils or from the wood of the branches. The peduncle is 10 to 12 cm (3.9 to 4.7 in) long and there are up to 5 flowers clustered at the apex.

The fruit are, in botanical terms, berries - i.e. fleshy, stoneless fruit produced from a single flower containing one ovary. They are somewhat conical or pear-shaped, and measure up to 5 cm (2.0 in) long by 4.5 cm (1.8 in) wide with 1 to 5 seeds.

== Taxonomy ==
This plant was first formally described as a new species in 1942 by Elmer Drew Merrill and Lily May Perry. They published the name in a paper titled Plantae Papuanae Archboldianae in the Journal of the Arnold Arboretum. There are no infraspecies of this taxon.

=== Etymology ===
The genus name Syzygium comes from the Greek word syzgos, meaning "joined" and is a reference to the paired leaves displayed by members of the genus. The species epithet puberulum come from the word puberulent meaning covered in fine hair, referring to the downy covering on the calyx.

== Distribution and habitat ==
In Australia this tree is found in Cape York Peninsula, particularly in the area of the Kutini-Payamu National Park (formerly Iron Range National Park), as well as some of the islands of the Torres Strait. In Papua New Guinea it has been observed in the south west near the border with West Papua, but there are many more observations in the southeast peninsula north, south and east of Port Moresby.

In Australia it is usually found occupying gallery forest, i.e. forest occurring beside a river or lake in areas that would otherwise not be suitable habitat, at elevations up to 160 m (520 ft). In Papua New Guinea it occurs mostly in rainforested gullies up to about 450 m (1,480 ft) above sea level.

== Ecology ==
Syzygium puberulum serves as a host plant for larvae of the pale cerulean butterfly (Jamides cyta)

== Conservation ==
This species is listed by both the Queensland Department of Environment and Science and the International Union for Conservation of Nature (IUCN) as least concern.

== Cultivation and uses ==
It has been suggested that the white satinash would make a good garden plant due to its weeping habit, colourful fruit and pendulous inflorescences, however there is no evidence that the species is being sold by nurseries. In the city of Cairns, just two specimens have been planted, both of them in the Tanks Arts Centre section of the Cairns Botanic Gardens. The species does not reach a size where it might produce useful timber.

== Gallery ==
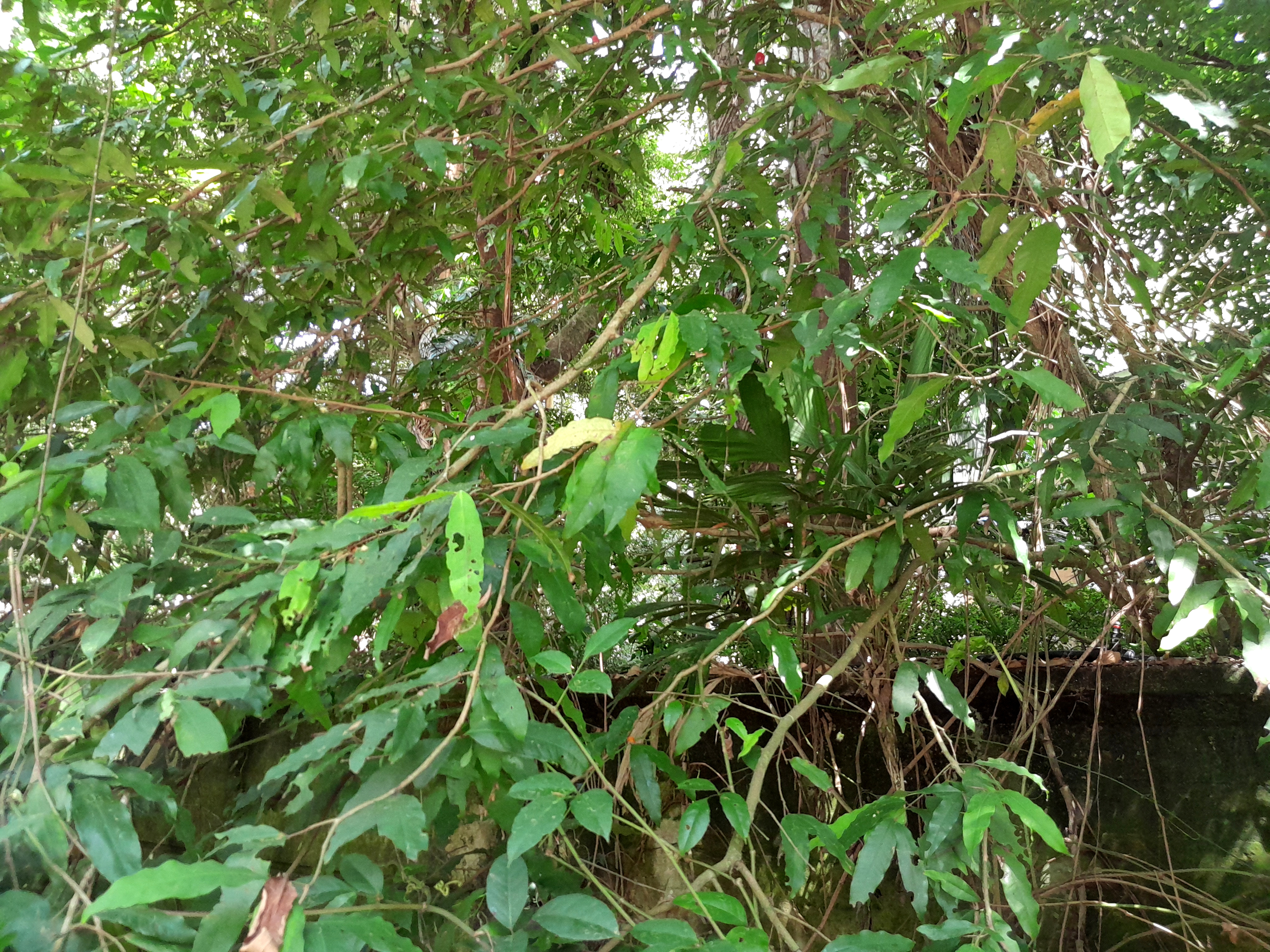
Weeping habit

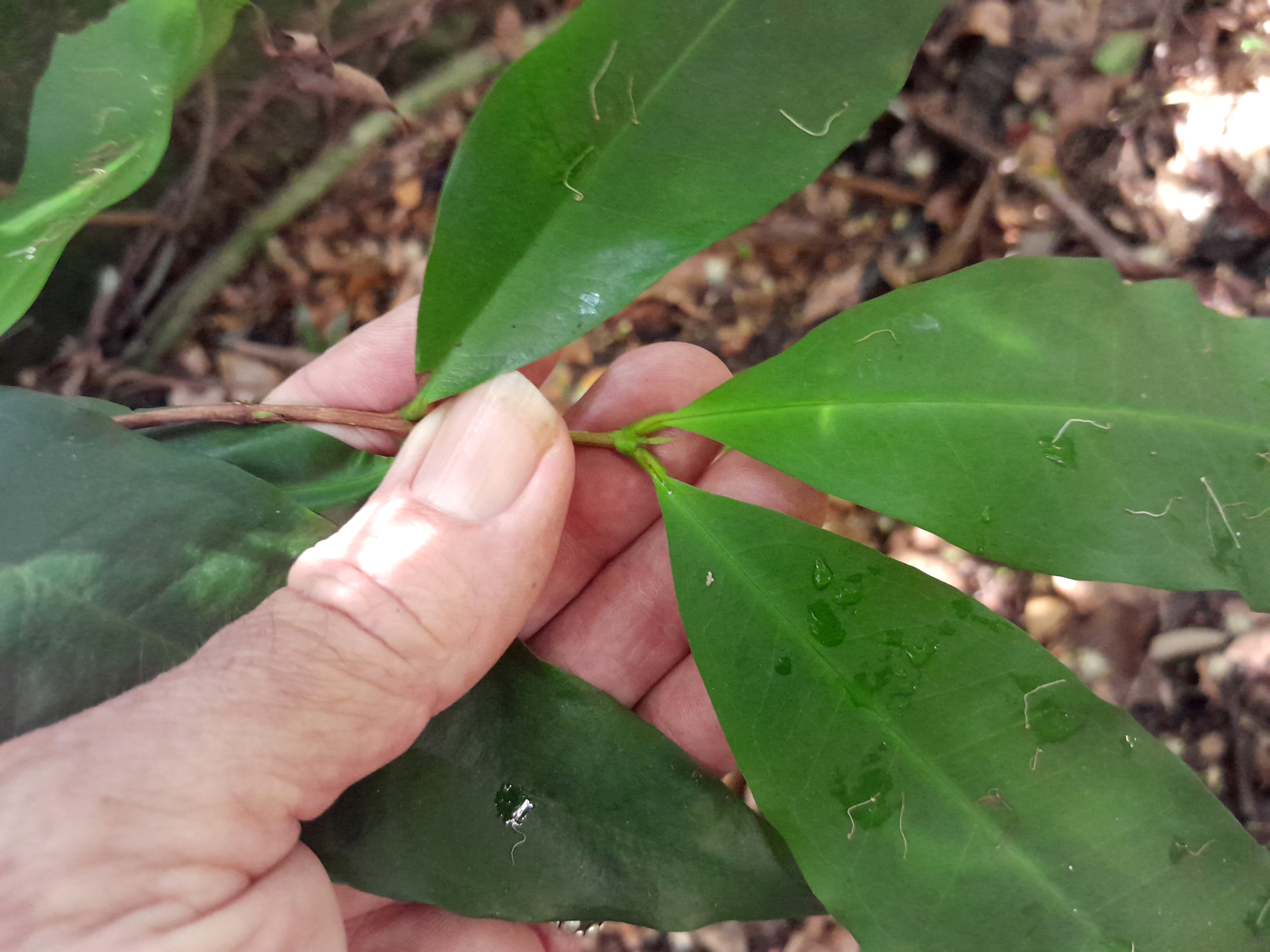
Foliage

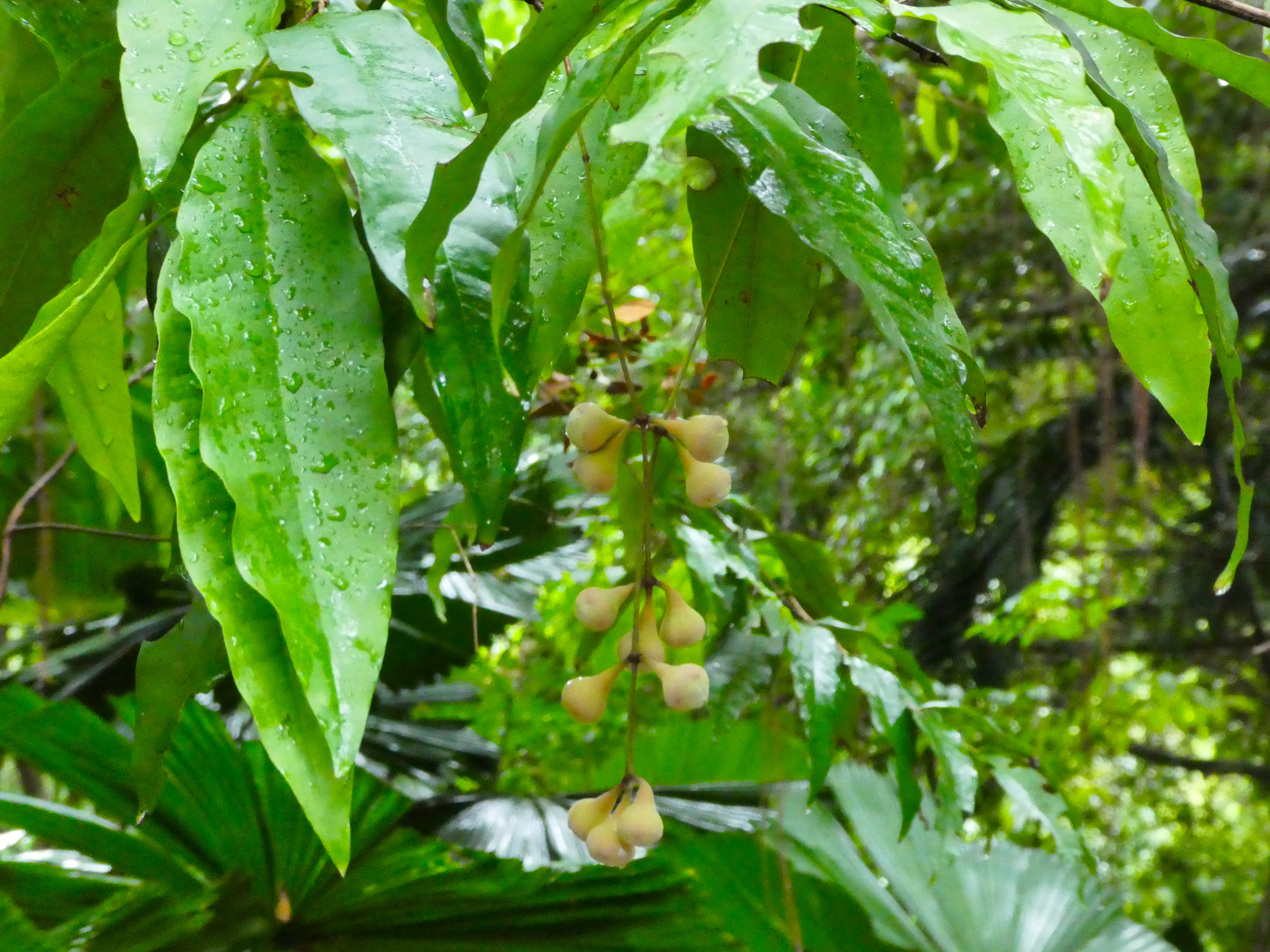
Flower buds

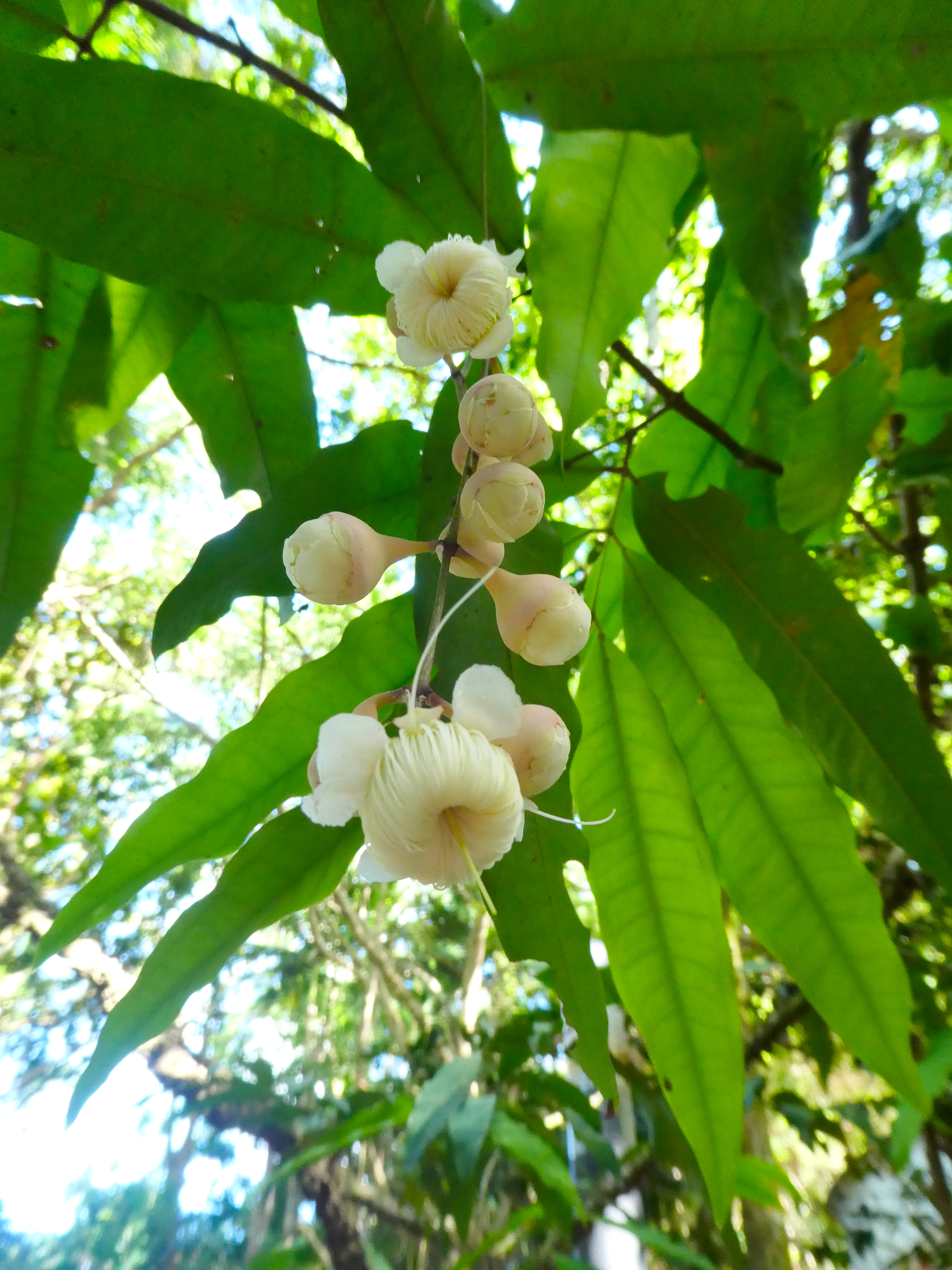
Buds on the verge of opening

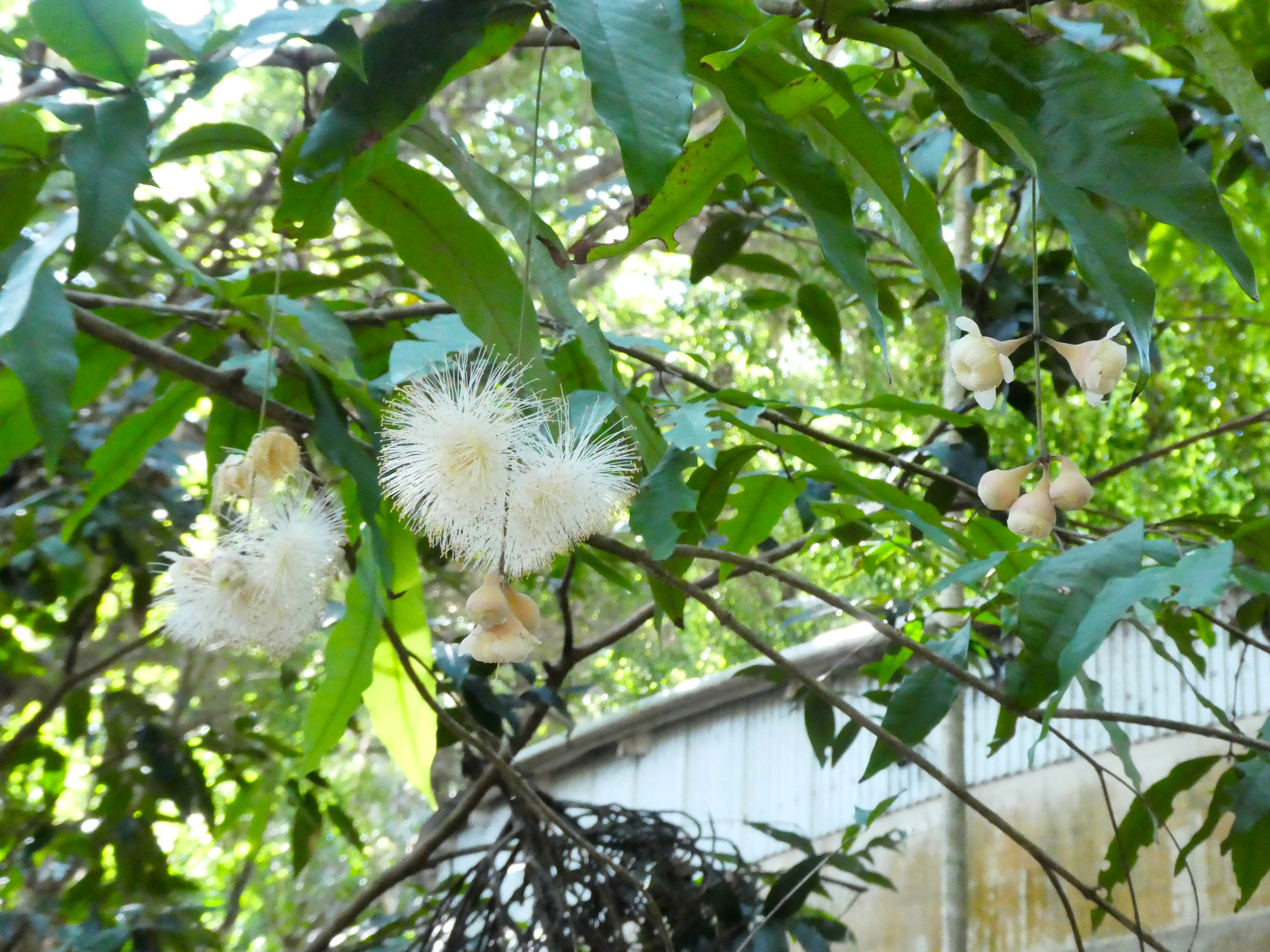
Flowers

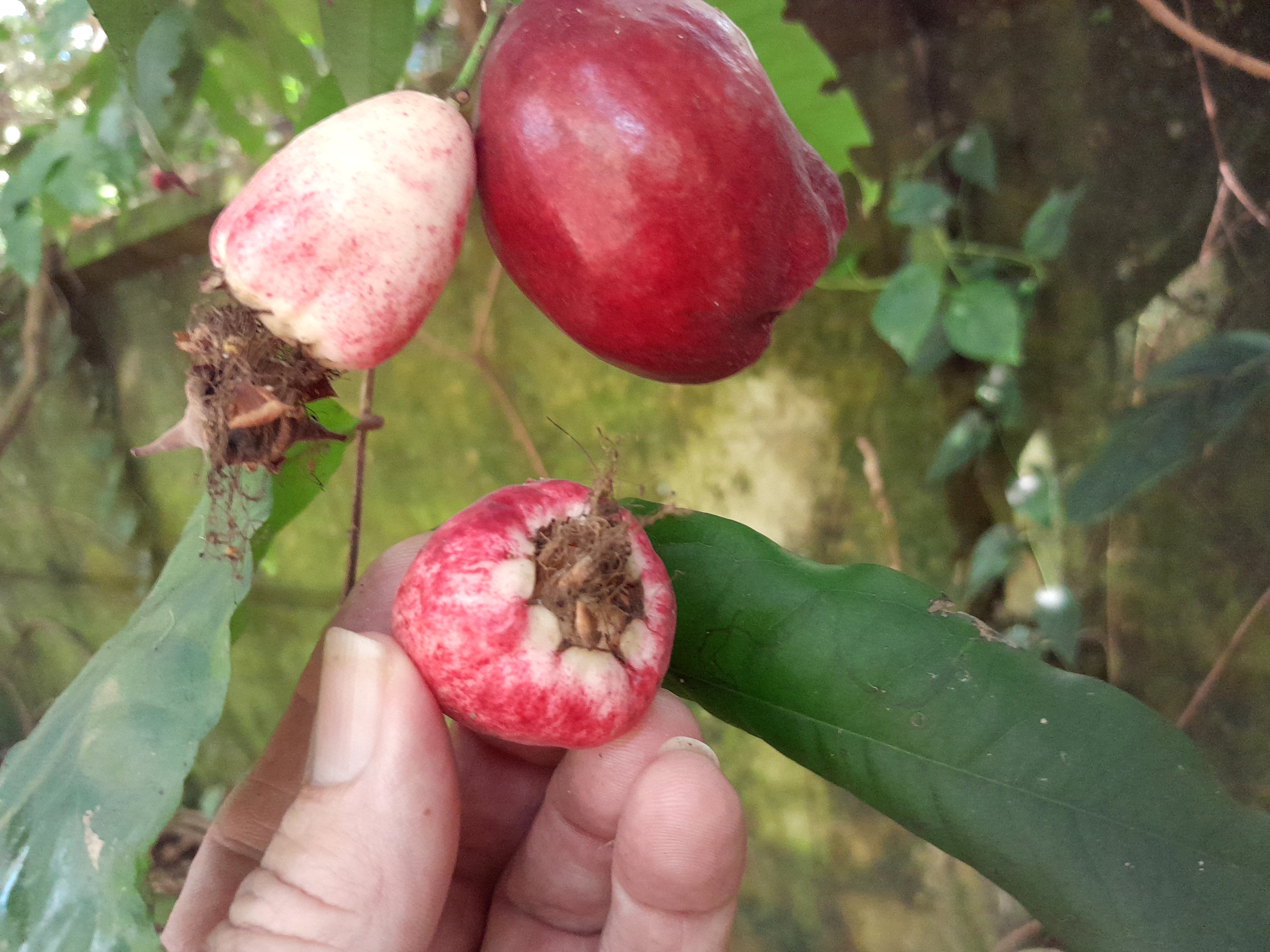
Fruit
