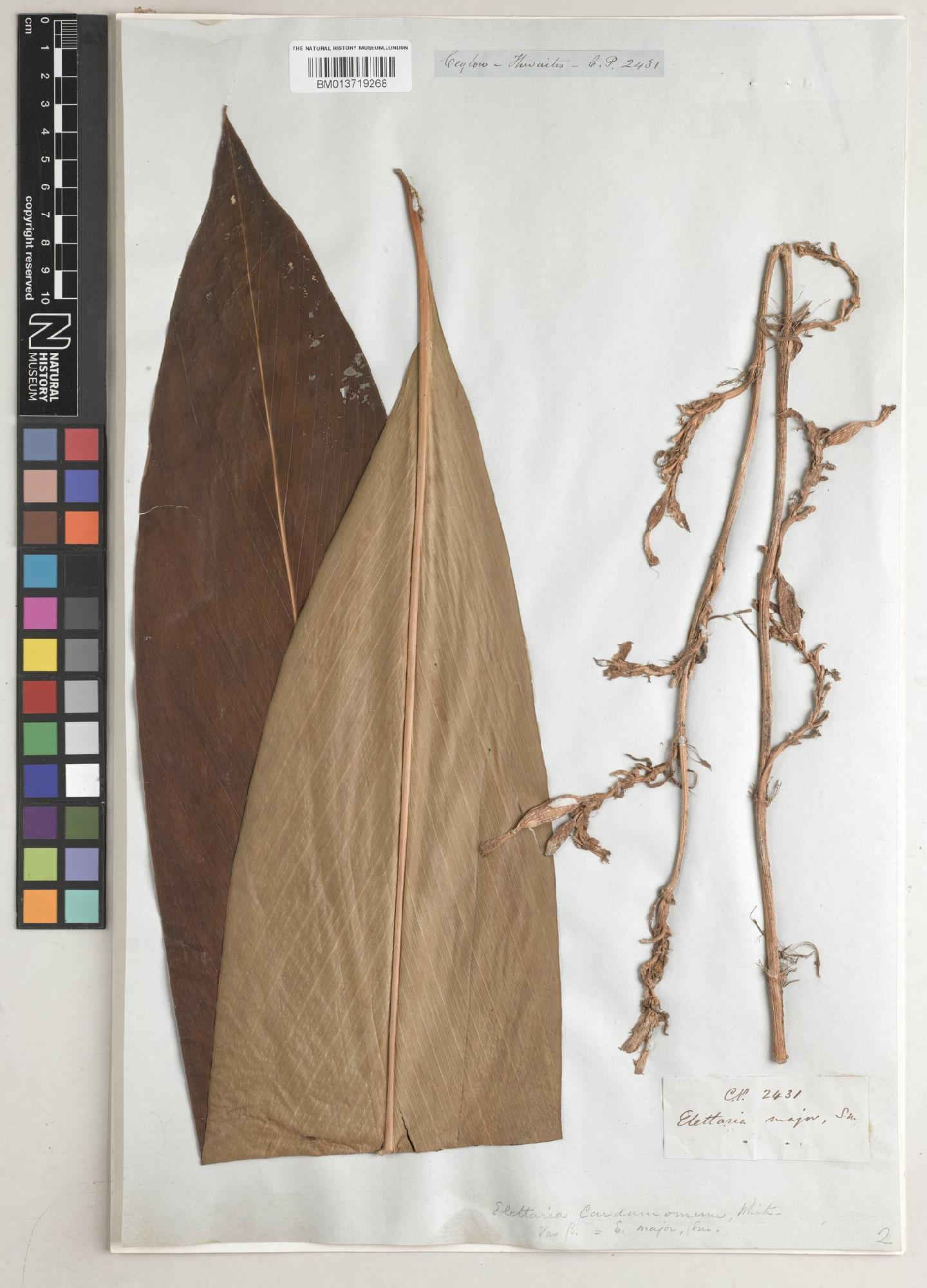

Scientific classification
- Kingdom: Plantae
- Clade: Tracheophytes
- Clade: Angiosperms
- Clade: Monocots
- Clade: Commelinids
- Order: Zingiberales
- Family: Zingiberaceae
- Genus: Elettaria
- Species: E. ensal

Binomial name
- Elettaria ensal (Gaertn.) Abeyw.

= Elettaria ensal =

Species of plant

Elettaria ensal is a monocotyledonous plant species that was first described by Joseph Gaertner, and got its current name from Bartholomeusz Aristides Abeywickrama. Elettaria ensal is part of the genus Elettaria and the family Zingiberaceae.
