= Sulettaria surculosa =

Scientific classification
- Kingdom: Plantae
- Clade: Tracheophytes
- Clade: Angiosperms
- Clade: Monocots
- Clade: Commelinids
- Order: Zingiberales
- Family: Zingiberaceae
- Genus: Sulettaria
- Species: S. surculosa

Binomial name
- Sulettaria surculosa (K.Schum.) B.L.Burtt & R.M.Sm

Species of flowering plant

Sulettaria surculosa is a monocotyledonous plant species that was first described by Karl Moritz Schumann, and received its current name from Brian Laurence Burtt and Rosemary Margaret Smith. Sulettaria surculosa is part of the genus Sulettaria and the family Zingiberaceae. No subspecies are listed in the Catalog of Life.

It was reclassified from Elettaria into Sulettaria in 2018:
