= Srilankanthus =

Scientific classification
- Kingdom: Plantae
- Clade: Tracheophytes
- Clade: Angiosperms
- Clade: Monocots
- Clade: Commelinids
- Order: Zingiberales
- Family: Zingiberaceae
- Genus: Srilankanthus; Maras. & A.D.Poulsen
- Species: S. nemoralis

Binomial name
- Srilankanthus nemoralis (Thwaites) Maras. & A.D.Poulsen

Synonyms
- Amomum nemorale (Thwaites) Trimen; Cardamomum nemorale (Thwaites) Kuntze; Elettaria nemoralis Thwaites (1861) (species basionym); Geanthus nemoralis (Thwaites) Loes.

Genus of flowering plants

Srilankanthus is a genus of flowering plants in the ginger family, Zingiberaceae. It includes a single species, Srilankanthus nemoralis, a rhizomatous geophyte native to Kalutara District of Sri Lanka.

The species was first described as Elettaria nemoralis by George Henry Kendrick Thwaites in 1861, and later known by several synonyms. In 2024 Lakmini Darshika Kumarage Marasinghe and Axel Dalberg Poulsen placed the species in the new monotypic genus Srilankanthus as Srilankanthus nemoralis.
