= Turmeric (disambiguation) =

Turmeric (Curcuma longa) is a rhizomatous herbaceous plant used as a spice.

Turmeric may also refer to:

== Related plants ==
- Black turmeric (Curcuma caesia)
- Narrow-leaved turmeric (Curcuma angustifolia)
- Tree turmeric (Berberis aristata)
- White turmeric (Curcuma zedoaria)
- Wild turmeric (Curcuma aromatica)

== Arts, entertainment, and media ==
- Turmeric (album), a box set album by the Japanese noise musician Merzbow

== Food and drinks ==
- Turmeric milk
- Turmeric tea
