= Curcuma woodii =

Scientific classification
- Kingdom: Plantae
- Clade: Embryophytes
- Clade: Tracheophytes
- Clade: Angiosperms
- Clade: Monocots
- Clade: Commelinids
- Order: Zingiberales
- Family: Zingiberaceae
- Genus: Curcuma
- Species: C. woodii

Binomial name
- Curcuma woodii N.H.Xia & Juan Chen

Species of flowering plant

Curcuma woodii is a species of flowering plant in the family Zingiberaceae. It is a perennial herb with white flowers, and capsule fruits. The species is native to Thailand.

Curcuma woodii was described in 2015. It is named after Tom Wood, who introduced the species to the South China National Botanical Garden.

== Taxonomy ==
Curcuma woodii was described by Nian-He Xia and Juan Chen in 2015. It was originally thought to be an artificial hybrid. Specimens were purchased from a wild plant market in Sa Kaeo province, Thailand, and planted at the Nong Nooch Tropical Garden. In 2010, the plants were introduced to the South China National Botanical Garden by the American curator Tom Wood, where they were recognised as a new species.

Curcuma woodii is in the subgenus Ecomata.

== Distribution ==
Curcuma woodii is native to the seasonally dry tropical biome of south-east Thailand.

== Description ==
Curcuma woodii is a perennial herb that grows up to 40–60 centimetres (1.3–2.0 ft) tall. It has underground storage organs. The rhizomes are slender.

The leafy shoots are up to 60 centimetres (24 in) tall, and have five leaves. The leaf stems are 16–23 centimetres (6.3–9.1 in) long. The leaves are ovate to elliptical, 26–30 centimetres (10–12 in) long, and 9–12 centimetres (3.5–4.7 in) wide.

The inflorescence is 4.5–5 centimetres (1.8–2.0 in) long, and 4.5–5 centimetres (1.8–2.0 in) wide. The inflorescence stem is 2–3 centimetres (0.79–1.18 in) long. The flowers are white, and 4–4.7 centimetres (1.6–1.9 in) long. The calyx is white, around 2 centimetres (0.79 in) long, and has two teeth. The corolla tube is white, and around 3 centimetres (1.2 in) long. The plant flowers from July to September.

The fruit is a dehiscent, roughly spherical capsule. The seeds are light brown, and obovate.

Curcuma woodii is similar to Curcuma rhomba in some aspects, though the species differ in the colour of the bracts and flowers. C. woodii is closely related to C. supraneeana.

== Etymology ==
The specific epithet woodii refers to the plant collecter Tom Wood.
