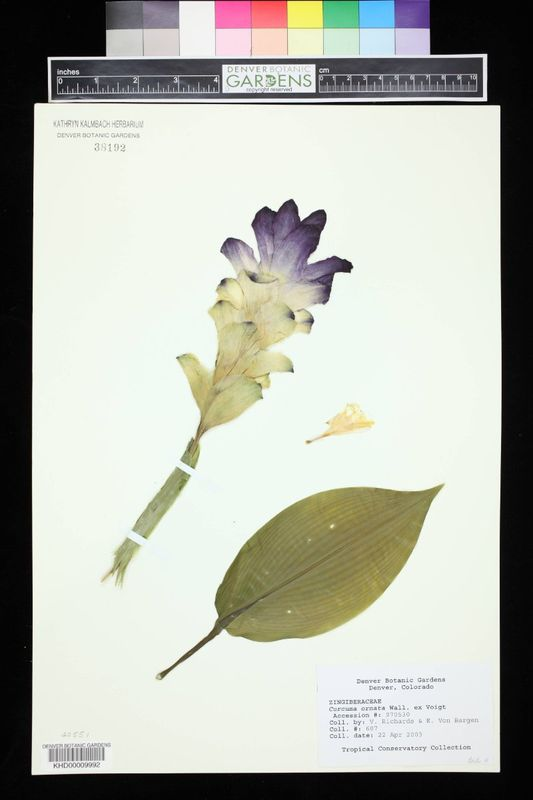

Conservation status
- Data Deficient (IUCN 3.1)

Scientific classification
- Kingdom: Plantae
- Clade: Embryophytes
- Clade: Tracheophytes
- Clade: Spermatophytes
- Clade: Angiosperms
- Clade: Monocots
- Clade: Commelinids
- Order: Zingiberales
- Family: Zingiberaceae
- Genus: Curcuma
- Species: C. ornata

Binomial name
- Curcuma ornata Wall. ex Voigt

= Curcuma ornata =

Species of flowering plant

Curcuma ornata is a species of flowering plant in the family Zingiberaceae. It is a rhizomatous plant native to Myanmar. The species was first validly described in 1845. It is listed as Data Deficient by the IUCN.

== Taxonomy ==
The name Curcuma ornata was first published invalidly by Nathaniel Wallich. The name was published validly by Joachim Otto Voigt in 1845. A 2005 paper states that the name is invalid, and may have been incorrectly applied to specimens of other species, including Curcuma zedoaria and Curcuma elata.

The species is known from a single specimen in the Calcutta Botanic Garden.

== Distribution ==
Curcuma ornata is native to the wet tropical biome of Myanmar. It is reportedly endemic to the Bago Region.

== Description ==
Curcuma ornata is a rhizomatous plant with underground storage organs. It has been described as closely allied to Curcuma comosa.

== Conservation ==
In 2009, the IUCN listed Curcuma ornata as Data Deficient.
