= Streptomyces phytohabitans =

Scientific classification
- Domain: Bacteria
- Kingdom: Bacillati
- Phylum: Actinomycetota
- Class: Actinomycetes
- Order: Streptomycetales
- Family: Streptomycetaceae
- Genus: Streptomyces
- Species: S. phytohabitans

Binomial name
- Streptomyces phytohabitans Bian et al. 2012

Type strain
- KCTC 19892, KLBMP 4601, NBRC 108772

Species of bacterium

Streptomyces phytohabitans is a bacterium species from the genus of Streptomyces which has been isolated from the plant Curcuma phaeocaulis from the Sichuan Province in China. Streptomyces phytohabitans produces the macrolides novonestmycin A and novonestmycin B.

== See also ==
- List of Streptomyces species
