= Curcuma rangjued =

Scientific classification
- Kingdom: Plantae
- Clade: Embryophytes
- Clade: Tracheophytes
- Clade: Angiosperms
- Clade: Monocots
- Clade: Commelinids
- Order: Zingiberales
- Family: Zingiberaceae
- Genus: Curcuma
- Species: C. rangjued

Binomial name
- Curcuma rangjued Saensouk & Boonma

Species of flowering plant

Curcuma rangjued is a species of flowering plant in the family Zingiberaceae. It is a perennial plant with yellowish flowers. The species is native to Laos and Thailand, and was described in 2021.

Curcuma rangjued is used to treat poisoning, and is named for a Thai word meaning "to make the poison fade or decrease".

== Taxonomy ==
The species was described by Surapon Saensouk and Thawatphong Boonma in 2021. The type specimen was collected in Mae Hong Son province, Thailand, in 2017.

Curcuma rangjued belongs to the subgenus Curcuma.

== Distribution ==
Curcuma rangjued is native to the wet tropical biome of Laos and Thailand. It grows in deciduous and dry evergreen forests.

== Description ==
Curcuma rangjued is a perennial herb with underground storage organs.

The leafy shoots are 60–120 centimetres (24–47 in) high, and have five to seven leaves. The leaf stems are 12–25 centimetres (4.7–9.8 in) long. The leaves are elliptical to oblanceolate, 20–60 centimetres (7.9–23.6 in) long, and 10–17 centimetres (3.9–6.7 in) wide.

The inflorescence is a thyrse that grows on a 25–35 centimetres (9.8–13.8 in) stem. The inflorescence is 15–20 centimetres (5.9–7.9 in) long. The calyx is 16–18 millimetres (0.63–0.71 in) long, yellowish-white, semitranslucent, and sparsely hairy. The floral tube is pale yellow, narrowly cylindrical at the base, and becomes funnel-shaped at the end. The flowers have a single stamen. The plant flowers in the rainy season, from June to October.

Curcuma rangjued is similar to Curcuma amada and Curcuma sichuanensis. Unlike C. amada and C. sichuanensis, the rhizome of Curcuma rangjued is not aromatic.

== Uses ==
The rhizome is used to treat poisoning and inflammation, and is used in detoxification.

== Etymology ==
The specific epithet rangjued is derived from the species' common name in Thai, which means 'to make the poison fade or decrease'.
