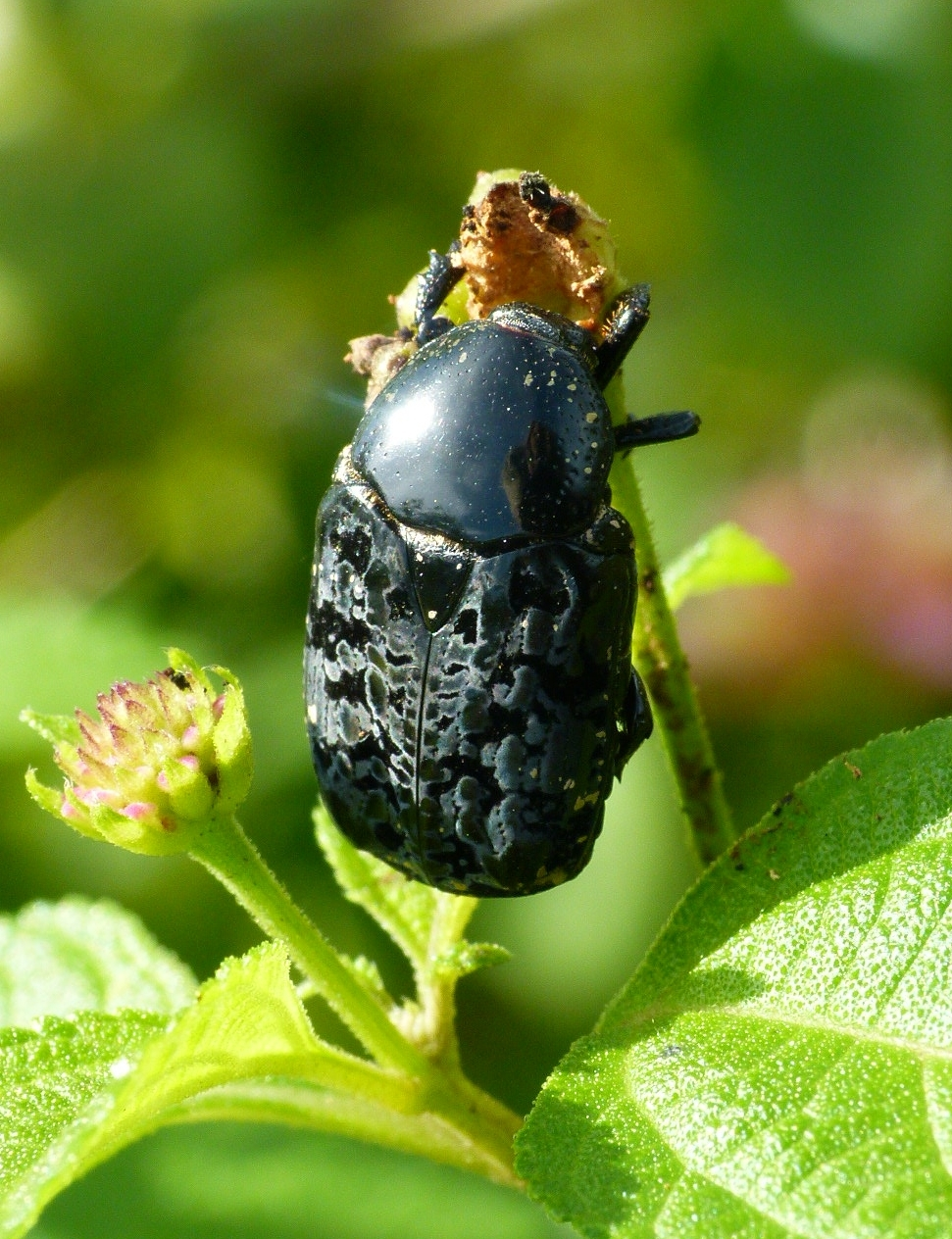

Scientific classification
- Kingdom: Animalia
- Phylum: Arthropoda
- Clade: Pancrustacea
- Class: Insecta
- Order: Coleoptera
- Suborder: Polyphaga
- Infraorder: Scarabaeiformia
- Family: Scarabaeidae
- Genus: Anthracophora
- Species: A. crucifera

Binomial name
- Anthracophora crucifera (Olivier, 1789)

Synonyms
- Cetonia crucifera Olivier, 1789; Anthracophora ceylonensis Kraatz, 1895; Cetonia atromaculata Fabricius, 1792

= Anthracophora crucifera =

Species of beetle

Anthracophora crucifera is a species of flower chafer found in India and Sri Lanka.

== Biology ==
Grubs usually feed on the decaying organic matter, both plant and animal. Adults feed on the floral parts of many commercially important crops such as Curcuma aromatica, Sorghum bicolor, Pennisetum glaucum, Abelmoschus esculentus.and Zea mays. Adults emerge with theonset of flowering season of the crops, during August to September.
