= Curcuma prakasha =

Scientific classification
- Kingdom: Plantae
- Clade: Tracheophytes
- Clade: Angiosperms
- Clade: Monocots
- Clade: Commelinids
- Order: Zingiberales
- Family: Zingiberaceae
- Genus: Curcuma
- Species: C. prakasha

Binomial name
- Curcuma prakasha S.Tripathi

Species of flowering plant

Curcuma prakasha is a species in the ginger family of plants, somewhat new to science. It was collected from open grassland (alt. c. 400m.) in the Garo Hills of Meghalaya State in India (its only known location) by its binomial author, Sunil Tripathi. He named it in Honor of Dr. Ved Prakash, an economic botanist, ethnobotanist and taxonomist. C. prakasha is ant-pollinated, and flowers and bears its fruit both in May. The rhizomes of C. prakasha are used locally to treat bruises and swollen throats. It is closely related to C. neilgherrensis Wight.
