= Curcuma zedoaroides =

Scientific classification
- Kingdom: Plantae
- Clade: Tracheophytes
- Clade: Angiosperms
- Clade: Monocots
- Clade: Commelinids
- Order: Zingiberales
- Family: Zingiberaceae
- Genus: Curcuma
- Species: C. zedoaroides

Binomial name
- Curcuma zedoaroides A.Chaveerach & T.Tanee

Species of flowering plant

Curcuma zedoaroides, locally named in Thai as Wan-paya-ngoo-tua-mia, is a plant cultivated in the King Cobra Village of Khon Kaen Province, northeastern Thailand, where it is commonly used as a snake-bite antidote. It was first described by Chaveerach et al. in 2008. Lattmann et al. (2010) and Salama et al. (2012) have published the antivenom activity of some phytochemical compounds isolated from plant rhizomes extract against Ophiophagus hannah (the king cobra).
