= Curcuma maxwellii =

Scientific classification
- Kingdom: Plantae
- Clade: Tracheophytes
- Clade: Angiosperms
- Clade: Monocots
- Clade: Commelinids
- Order: Zingiberales
- Family: Zingiberaceae
- Genus: Curcuma
- Species: C. maxwellii

Binomial name
- Curcuma maxwellii Škorničk. & Suksathan

Species of flowering plant

Curcuma maxwellii is a species of flowering plant in the family Zingiberaceae. It is a rhizomatous plant with orange and red flowers. The species is native to Thailand, and was described in 2023.

== Taxonomy ==
The species was described by Jana Leong-Škorničková and Piyakaset Suksathan in 2023.

== Distribution ==
Curcuma maxwellii is native to the seasonally dry tropical biome of Thailand. It grows in shaded or semi-shaped moist areas, at elevations of 400–900 metres (1,300–3,000 ft).

== Description ==
Curcuma maxwellii has underground brown rhizomes, which have a bitter aroma.

The leafy shoots are around 95 centimetres (3.12 ft) long, and have three or six leaves. The leaf stems are 4.5–26 centimetres (1.8–10.2 in) long. The leaves are elliptical to elliptical-ovate, 16–44 centimetres (6.3–17.3 in) long, and 6.5–14 centimetres (2.6–5.5 in) wide.

The inflorescence stem is 5–12 centimetres (2.0–4.7 in) long. The inflorescence is a 5–7.5 centimetres (2.0–3.0 in) long thyrse. The flowers are 6–7 centimetres (2.4–2.8 in) long, and red or orange in colour. The calyx is white and pink, and up to 22 millimetres (0.87 in) long. The floral tube is pink and red, and around 4.5 centimetres (1.8 in) long. The corolla lobes are red on the outside, and orange on the inside. The labellum is orange with a maroon border. The plant flowers from June to September.

The fruits are subglobose, around 1 centimetre (0.39 in) wide, and cream with a pink tinge. Each fruit has six to ten seeds, which are light brown, and around 4 millimetres (0.16 in) long.

Curcuma maxwellii is similar to Curcuma rhomba and Curcuma flammea.

== Etymology ==
Curcuma maxwellii is named after James Franklin Maxwell. He collected the species in 1992.
