= Curcuma diversicolor =

Scientific classification
- Kingdom: Plantae
- Clade: Embryophytes
- Clade: Tracheophytes
- Clade: Spermatophytes
- Clade: Angiosperms
- Clade: Monocots
- Clade: Commelinids
- Order: Zingiberales
- Family: Zingiberaceae
- Genus: Curcuma
- Species: C. diversicolor

Binomial name
- Curcuma diversicolor Soonthornk.

Species of flowering plant

Curcuma diversicolor is a species of flowering plant in the family Zingiberaceae. It is a perennial plant with elliptical leaves. The flowers are pink, white, cream, and yellow, and the bracts are green, reddish-brown, white and magenta.

The species is native to Thailand, and was described in 2024. It is named for its colourful bracts.

== Taxonomy ==
Curcuma diversicolor was described by Sutthinut Soonthornkalump in 2024. It is part of the subgenus Curcuma.

== Distribution ==
Curcuma diversicolor is native to the seasonally dry tropical biome of Thailand. It has been collected from a forest park in Tak Province.

== Description ==
Curcuma diversicolor is a perennial herb that grows 55–80 centimetres (22–31 in) tall. It has rhizomes, which are 5–9.5 centimetres (2.0–3.7 in) long, and 1.8–3.7 centimetres (0.71–1.46 in) wide.

The shoots have four to five leaves. The leaves are elliptical, 25–40 centimetres (9.8–15.7 in) long, and 8–14 centimetres (3.1–5.5 in) wide. The leaf sheaths form a pseudostem up to 25 centimetres (9.8 in) long. The leaf margins are translucent.

The inflorescence stem is embedded in the ground, and usually has three or four sheaths. The thyrse is 8.2–25 centimetres (3.2–9.8 in) long, 6–7.5 centimetres (2.4–3.0 in) wide. The thyrse has thirteen to thirty fertile bracts, and six to ten sterile bracts. The fertile bracts are green to reddish-brown. The sterile bracts are white to magenta, have a green or pink tinge, and usually turn green as they age. The flowers in the uppermost bracts are often underdeveloped.

The flowers are 5.8–6 centimetres (2.3–2.4 in) long. The calyx is 7.5–9 millimetres (0.30–0.35 in) long, and has three teeth. The floral tube is 3.8–4 centimetres (1.5–1.6 in) long, narrowly cylindrical at the base, and narrowly funnel-shaped at the end. The outside of the flower is white, cream, or pale yellow-cream, and the inside is yellow-cream. The corolla has pink and white lobes. The lip is cream-yellow, broadly ovate to obovate, 11–14 millimetres (0.43–0.55 in) long, and 16–23 millimetres (0.63–0.91 in) wide. The lip has three lobes. The outer lobes are folded upwards, and the central lobe is usually curved upwards. The pollen is white. The plant flowers in late April and May, and the flowers last for only one day.

Curcuma diversicolor is morphologically similar to Curcuma globulifera, but the former has larger flowers. It is also similar to Curcuma sirirugsae.

== Cultivation ==
Curcuma diversicolor may have traits that make it suitable for breeding programs, or useful in landscaping. Describing author Sutthinut Soonthornkalump reported using tissue culture to propagate the species.

== Etymology ==
The specific epithet "diversicolor" refers to the coma bracts, which have a high level of colour variation.
