= Curcuma oligantha =

Scientific classification
- Kingdom: Plantae
- Clade: Tracheophytes
- Clade: Angiosperms
- Clade: Monocots
- Clade: Commelinids
- Order: Zingiberales
- Family: Zingiberaceae
- Genus: Curcuma
- Species: C. oligantha

Binomial name
- Curcuma oligantha Trimen

Species of flowering plant

Curcuma oligantha is a species of flowering plant in the family Zingiberaceae. It is a perennial or rhizomatous plant with white flowers. The species is native to south Asia, and was described in 1885.

== Taxonomy ==
The species was described by Henry Trimen in 1885.

== Distribution ==
Curcuma oligantha is native to the seasonally dry tropical biome of India, Myanmar, and Sri Lanka.

== Description ==
Curcuma oligantha is a perennial, or has underground rhizomes. The rhizomes are oblong-ovoid or rod-shaped. The leaves are thin and oval-shaped.

The inflorescence is a spike with four to six bracts, and a few large white flowers. The corolla tube is slender, and around 1 inch (2.5 cm) long. The labellum is white, with yellow stains.

The seeds are grey, oblong, and shiny.
