= Curcuma andersonii =

Scientific classification
- Kingdom: Plantae
- Clade: Tracheophytes
- Clade: Angiosperms
- Clade: Monocots
- Clade: Commelinids
- Order: Zingiberales
- Family: Zingiberaceae
- Genus: Curcuma
- Species: C. andersonii

Binomial name
- Curcuma andersonii (Baker) Škorničk.

Synonyms
- Kaempferia andersonii Baker; Stahlianthus andersonii (Baker) Craib ex Loes.

Species of flowering plant

Curcuma andersonii is a species of flowering plant in the family Zingiberaceae. It is native to Myanmar, and was described in 1890.

== Taxonomy ==
John Gilbert Baker described the species in 1890, and placed it in the genus Kaempferia. In 1930, it was moved to the genus Stahlianthus. In 2015, Jana Leong-Škorničková, Otakar Šída, Eliška Záveská, and Karol Marhold sank Stahlianthus into Curcuma.

Curcuma andersonii is placed in the subgenus Hitcheniopsis.

== Distribution ==
Curcuma andersonii is native to the wet tropical biome of Myanmar.

== Description ==
Curcuma andersonii has underground storage organs.
