= Curcuma nakhonphanomensis =

Scientific classification
- Kingdom: Plantae
- Clade: Tracheophytes
- Clade: Angiosperms
- Clade: Monocots
- Clade: Commelinids
- Order: Zingiberales
- Family: Zingiberaceae
- Genus: Curcuma
- Species: C. nakhonphanomensis

Binomial name
- Curcuma nakhonphanomensis Boonma, Saensouk & P.Saensouk

Species of flowering plant

Curcuma nakhonphanomensis is a species of flowering plant in the family Zingiberaceae. It is a perennial herb with rhizomes and white, yellow, orange, and red flowers. The species is native to Laos and Thailand, and was described in 2022. The inflorescences are edible.

== Taxonomy ==
Curcuma nakhonphanomensis was described by Thawatphong Boonma, Surapon Saensouk, and Piyaporn Saensouk in 2022. It is part of the subgenus Ecomata.

== Distribution ==
Curcuma nakhonphanomensis is native to the wet tropical biome of Laos and Thailand. It grows in rich humus, at elevations of 146–165 metres (479–541 ft), near Globba globulifera and Zingiber mekongense.

== Description ==
Curcuma nakhonphanomensis is a perennial herb. It has underground rhizomes, which are brownish and slightly aromatic.

The leafy shoots are 35–50 centimetres (14–20 in) tall. The leaves are 16–30 centimetres (6.3–11.8 in) long, and 8–13 centimetres (3.1–5.1 in) wide. The leaf stems are 6.5–15 centimetres (2.6–5.9 in) long.

The inflorescence is a 5–6 centimetres (2.0–2.4 in) long thyrse. The inflorescence stem is 3–6 centimetres (1.2–2.4 in) long. The flowers are 6.2–6.5 centimetres (2.4–2.6 in) long. The calyx is tube-shaped, red and white, and 22–25 centimetres (8.7–9.8 in) long. The labellum is 2.1–2.3 centimetres (0.83–0.91 in) long, 1.8–1.9 centimetres (0.71–0.75 in) wide, obovate, and white, yellow, orange, and red. The labellum has a three-lobed apex. The floral tube is white, and 4.0–4.1 centimetres (1.6–1.6 in) long. The plant flowers from late June to September.

Curcuma nakhonphanomensis is morphologically similar to Curcuma peramoena.

== Uses ==
Curcuma nakhonphanomensis is cultivated by Thai collecters of sacred plants. The inflorescences can be eaten fresh or boiled, and are sometimes served with chili paste.

== Nomenclature ==
Curcuma nakhonphanomensis is named after Thailand's Nakhon Phanom province, where it was first discovered. In Thai, the species is known as ขมิ้นนครพนม (khmin nkhrphnm).
