= Curcuma graminifolia =

Scientific classification
- Kingdom: Plantae
- Clade: Tracheophytes
- Clade: Angiosperms
- Clade: Monocots
- Clade: Commelinids
- Order: Zingiberales
- Family: Zingiberaceae
- Subfamily: Zingiberoideae
- Tribe: Zingibereae
- Genus: Curcuma
- Species: C. graminifolia

Binomial name
- Curcuma graminifolia (K.Larsen & Jenjitt.) Škorničk. (2015)

Synonyms
- Laosanthus graminifolius K.Larsen & Jenjitt. (2001)

Genus of flowering plants

Curcuma graminifolia is a species of flowering plant in the ginger family, Zingiberaceae. It is a rhizomatous geophyte endemic to Laos.

The species was first described as Laosanthus graminifolius in 2001, and placed in the monotypic genus Laosanthus. In 2015 it was placed in genus Curcuma as Curcuma graminifolia.
