= Curcuma achrae =

Scientific classification
- Kingdom: Plantae
- Clade: Embryophytes
- Clade: Tracheophytes
- Clade: Angiosperms
- Clade: Monocots
- Clade: Commelinids
- Order: Zingiberales
- Family: Zingiberaceae
- Genus: Curcuma
- Species: C. achrae

Binomial name
- Curcuma achrae Saensouk & Boonma

Species of flowering plant

Curcuma achrae is a species of flowering plant in the family Zingiberaceae. It is a perennial herb with six to eight leaves. The flowers are yellow, white, and pale pink.

Curcuma achrae is native to Thailand, and was described in 2022.

== Taxonomy ==
The species was described by Surapon Saensouk and Thawatphong Boonma in 2022. The type specimen was collected in Nakhon Nayok province.

Curcuma achrae is part of the subgenus Ecomata.

== Distribution ==
Curcuma achrae is native to the wet tropical biome of Thailand. It grows at elevations of 60–152 metres (197–499 ft), on sandy loam near water.

== Description ==
Curcuma achrae is a perennial herb that grows up to 45 centimetres (18 in) tall. It has underground storage organs. The rhizome is externally brown, and internally pale yellow.

The leafy shoots have six to eight leaves. The pseudostem is green, tinged with reddish-brown, and 18–14 centimetres (7.1–5.5 in) long. The ligules are up to 6 millimetres (0.24 in) long, and the leaf stems are up to 25 centimetres (9.8 in) long. The leaves are narrowly ovate to elliptical, 26–45 centimetres (10–18 in) long, 10–13 centimetres (3.9–5.1 in) wide, and have slightly undulating edges.

The inflorescence stems are white, and 3–5 centimetres (1.2–2.0 in) long. The inflorescence is a spike, measuring 4–6.5 centimetres (1.6–2.6 in) long, and 2–3 centimetres (0.79–1.18 in) wide in the middle. The plant has ten to eighteen fertile bracts.

The flowers are 5.8–6.4 centimetres (2.3–2.5 in) long, and have a tube-shaped calyx. The calyx is 18–20 millimetres (0.71–0.79 in) long, translucent, and white. The floral tube is 30–32 millimetres (1.2–1.3 in) long, and yellowish white with a pale pink tinge. The lobes of the corolla are yellowish-white, and tinged with pale pink. The labellum is white, golden-yellow, and pale yellow. The plant flowers from late March to early May. The flowers last for one day.

Curcuma achrae is similar to Curcuma xanthella, Curcuma flaviflora, and Curcuma aruna.

== Etymology ==
The species is named after Achra Thammathaworn, an assistant professor at Khon Kaen University. Its common name is Khamin Thong.
