= Curcuma amarissima =

Scientific classification
- Kingdom: Plantae
- Clade: Tracheophytes
- Clade: Angiosperms
- Clade: Monocots
- Clade: Commelinids
- Order: Zingiberales
- Family: Zingiberaceae
- Genus: Curcuma
- Species: C. amarissima

Binomial name
- Curcuma amarissima Roscoe

Species of flowering plant

Curcuma amarissima is a species of flowering plant in the family Zingiberaceae. The plant has underground storage organs, oblong leaves, and red flowers. The species is native to Asia, and was described in 1826.

== Taxonomy ==
The species was described by William Roscoe in 1826.

== Distribution ==
Curcuma amarissima is native to the seasonally dry tropical biome of Bangladesh, south-central China, India, and Myanmar. It grows on forest floors, at elevations of around 800 metres (2,600 ft).

== Description ==
Curcuma amarissima grows up to 1 metre (3.3 ft) tall. It has underground storage organs. The rhizomes are large, bitter, yellow on the inside, and bluish-green on the outside.

The leaf stems are long and reddish-brown. The leaves are oblong, around 45 centimetres (18 in) long, and around 14 centimetres (5.5 in) wide.

The inflorescence is a cylindrical spike, measuring around 14 centimetres (5.5 in) long, and 9 centimetres (3.5 in) wide. The fertile bracts are ovate, and around 5 centimetres (2.0 in) long. The sterile bracts are whitish, with a red and pink apex. The calyx is around 1 centimetre (0.39 in) long, and its apex has three lobes. The corolla is a red tube around 2 centimetres (0.79 in) long. The corolla has oblong lobes that are around 1 centimetre (0.39 in) long. The labellum is yellowish, semi-elliptical, and has three lobes. The plant flowers in May.

== Nomenclature ==
In Chinese, the species is known as 極苦薑黃 (ji ku jiang huang).
