= Curcuma bicolor =

Scientific classification
- Kingdom: Plantae
- Clade: Tracheophytes
- Clade: Angiosperms
- Clade: Monocots
- Clade: Commelinids
- Order: Zingiberales
- Family: Zingiberaceae
- Genus: Curcuma
- Species: C. bicolor

Binomial name
- Curcuma bicolor Mood & K.Larsen

Species of flowering plant

Curcuma bicolor is a species of flowering plant in the ginger family.

== Taxonomy ==
Curcuma bicolor was first described in 2001, by John Donald Mood and Kai Larsen.

== Range ==
Curcuma bicolor is native to Laos and Thailand.
