= Curcuma sixsensesensis =

Scientific classification
- Kingdom: Plantae
- Clade: Embryophytes
- Clade: Tracheophytes
- Clade: Angiosperms
- Clade: Monocots
- Clade: Commelinids
- Order: Zingiberales
- Family: Zingiberaceae
- Genus: Curcuma
- Species: C. sixsensesensis

Binomial name
- Curcuma sixsensesensis D.D.Nguyen & T.A.Le

Species of flowering plant

Curcuma sixsensesensis is a species of flowering plant in the family Zingiberaceae. It has leafy shoots, white flowers, and cream-white fruits. The species is native to Vietnam.

Curcuma sixsensesensis was described in 2022, and is named after an ecology resort.

== Taxonomy ==
The species was described in 2022 by Danh-Duc Nguyen and Tuan Anh Le. The species is placed in the subgenus Ecomata.

== Distribution ==
Curcuma sixsensesensis is native to the wet tropical biome of Vietnam. The type locality is in Vietnam's Khánh Hòa province.

It grows under the canopy in semi-deciduous coastal forests, at elevations of 150–200 metres (490–660 ft).

== Description ==
Curcuma sixsensesensis has underground storage organs. The rhizome is ovoid, 2–3 centimetres (0.79–1.18 in) long, 0.5–1.5 centimetres (0.20–0.59 in) wide, and light brown on the outside.

The plant is 30–40 centimetres (12–16 in) tall. Each plant has one to three leafy shoots, and each shoot has two to five leaves. The pseudostem is 15–25 centimetres (5.9–9.8 in) long. The leaf stem is 5–20 centimetres (2.0–7.9 in) long. The leaves are elliptic to lanceolate, 20–22 centimetres (7.9–8.7 in) long, and 5–8 centimetres (2.0–3.1 in) wide.

The stem of the inflorescence is 10–20 centimetres (3.9–7.9 in) long, white, and hidden underground. The inflorescence is a 4–5 centimetres (1.6–2.0 in) long spike. The flowers are 4.5–5.5 centimetres (1.8–2.2 in) long. The calyx is 20–23 millimetres (0.79–0.91 in) long, white, semitranslucent, and has three teeth. The floral tube is 2.7–3 centimetres (1.1–1.2 in) long, white, and funnel-shaped at the apex. The pollen is white. The plant flowers at the start of the rainy season, from August to October.

The fruits are spherical to ellipsoid, 11–12 millimetres (0.43–0.47 in) long, 9–11 millimetres (0.35–0.43 in) wide, and cream-white in colour. The seeds are obovate, 4–5 millimetres (0.16–0.20 in) long, light brown, and shiny.

Curcuma sixsensesensis is similar to Curcuma newmanii, Curcuma singularis, and Curcuma tongii.

== Uses ==
Reproductive parts of Curcuma sixsensesensis are sold as vegetables in local markets.

== Etymology ==
The specific epithet sixsensesensis refers to Six Senses Ninh Van Bay, an ecology resort where the species occurs.
