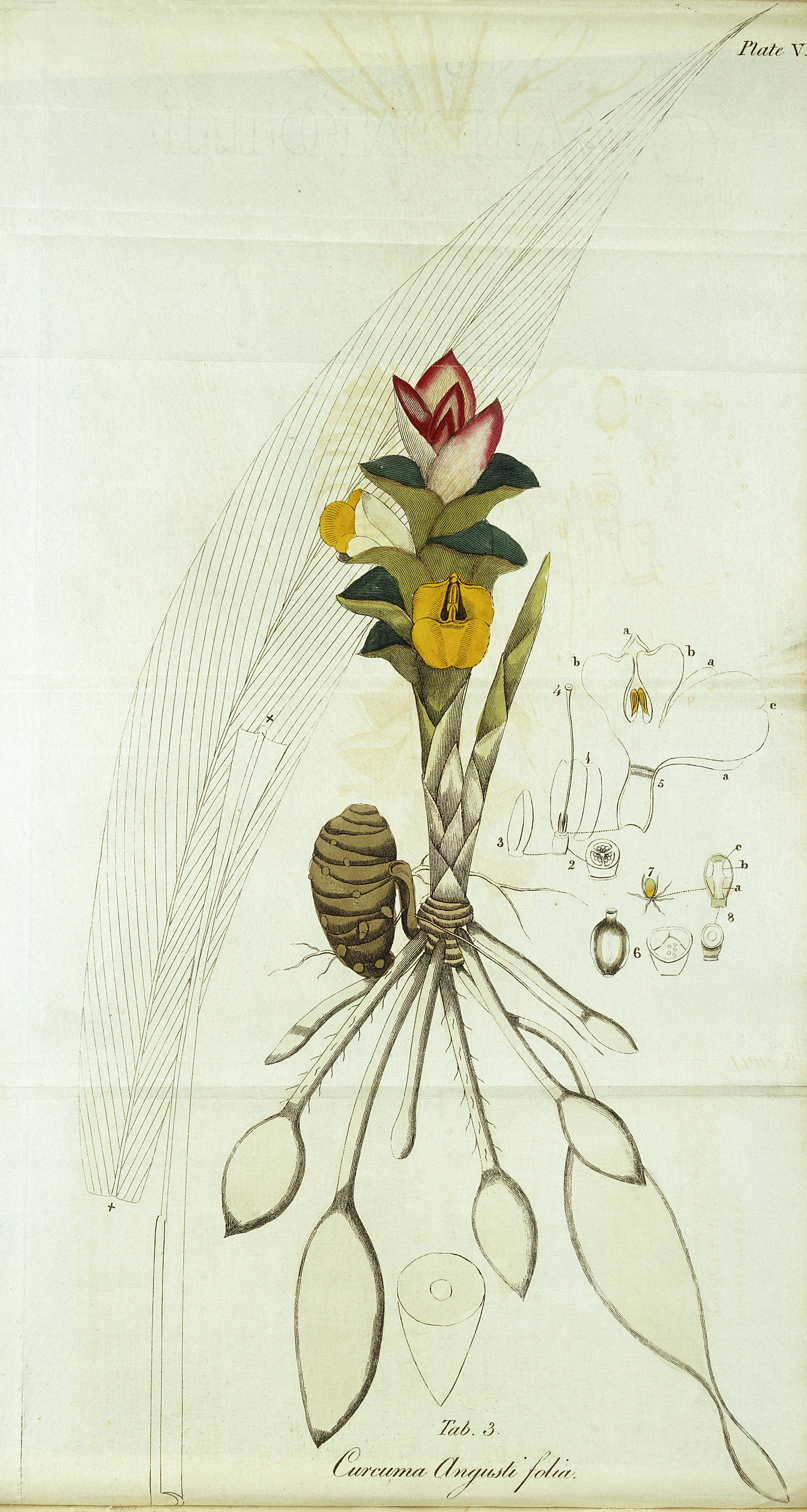

Scientific classification
- Kingdom: Plantae
- Clade: Tracheophytes
- Clade: Angiosperms
- Clade: Monocots
- Clade: Commelinids
- Order: Zingiberales
- Family: Zingiberaceae
- Genus: Curcuma
- Species: C. angustifolia

Binomial name
- Curcuma angustifolia Roxb.

= Curcuma angustifolia =

Species of flowering plant

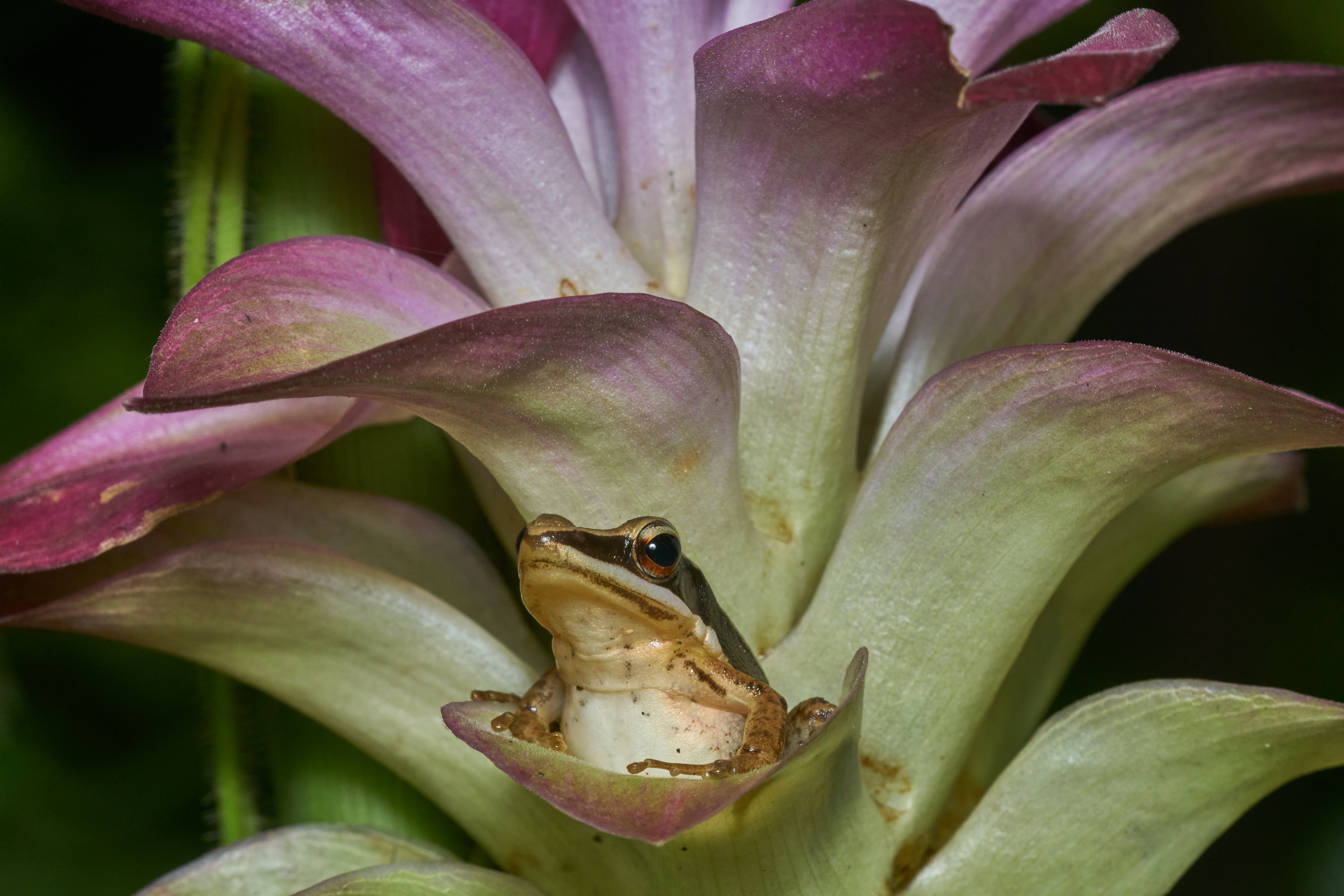
Flower

Curcuma angustifolia is one of over 80 species belonging to the genus Curcuma , in the family Zingiberaceae. This species is native to the Indian subcontinent and is more commonly known as East Indian arrowroot or narrow-leaved turmeric in English, and is called "yaipan" in Manipuri, "Aipah" in Thadou-Kuki, "tikhur" in Bhojpuri, and "Koova" കൂവ in Malayalam/Tamil, and is called "Kutupah" in Poula. In the Eastern hemisphere, the plant plays an integral role in many cultures.

== Description ==
Curcuma angustifolia is rhizomatous herb. It is a perennial and a flowering plant, with modest and small spiked inflorescences of three or four yellow, funnel-shaped flowers within tufts of pink terminal bracts (coma bracts). The bracts are boat-shaped and encase the entire perianth of the flower. As is common to the genus, the flowers of C. angustifolia have double anthers, a slender style, and a globular stigma. Flowers are usually seen at the beginning of the monsoon (rainy) season from July to August, before the leaves have had the chance to fully develop, and they continue to flower even after the leaves have fully developed. The calyx of the flower is usually 1 cm (0.39 in) long and very hairy, with 3 lobes that may appear to be triangular or obtuse. The corolla is white, and usually grows to be about 1.5–2 cm (0.59–0.79 in) long with glabrous lobes that are also hairy. Seeds are a reddish-brown color.

Leaves are typically simple, green, glabrous, and lanceolate, with margins that are entire. They appear in an opposite arrangement and are deciduous. They display fine parallel venation off of a central midrib. The upper surface of the leaves are usually a darker shade of green than the lower surfaces. Leaves may grow to about 36–37 cm (14–15 in) length and 8–10 cm (3.1–3.9 in) in width. The leaves also smell and taste similar to turmeric.

Of great significance to C. angustifolia is its strong rhizome, which can grow to be up to 1.5 m (4.9 ft) in length. The rhizome of this plant is the primary source of its nutritive and medicinal properties. C. angustifolia also uses its rhizome to reproduce asexually via vegetative propagation.

The plant in its entirety typically grows to be from .9–1.2 m (3.0–3.9 ft) in height.

== Distribution and habitat ==
C. angustifolia is most commonly found growing wild in India, especially in the northeast and western coastal plains and hills. Such areas include the states of Maharashtra, Madhya Pradesh, Manipur, Andhra Pradesh, Himachal Pradesh, Orissa (Odisha), Chhattisgarh, Tamil Nadu, and Kerala. This species can also be found in Bangladesh, Burma, Laos, Nepal, and Pakistan.

== Cultivation ==
Curcuma angustifolia requires temperatures at or above 1 °C (34 °F). It prefers shady areas and grows best in moist soil that is sandy, pebbly, or loamy. C. angustifolia is often found at the edges or in the clearings of forests.

== Common uses ==
While commonplace in Eastern culture and medicine, C. angustifolia has only recently earned the attention of the Western scientific community.

=== Food uses ===
This species of plant has nutritional value as a source of starch for Indian foods. The rhizomes of C. angustifolia are typically ground into a flour which can then be mixed together with milk or water to form a nutritious meal. This flour was a common commercial crop in the 1800s.

Most importantly, the West has begun to notice its potential as a source of nutrition and as a non-irritating diet for patients with specific chronic ailments, recovering from fevers, or experiencing irritations of the gastrointestinal tract, the lungs, or the excretory system. A drink including C. angustifolia as an ingredient is also used as a replacement of breast-milk, or as a nutritional supplement for babies a short while after weaning.

It is found as a primary ingredient in cakes, fruit preserves, biscuits, and puddings.

=== Medicinal uses ===
The rhizomes of C. angustifolia are used to soothe coughs and as such is used to treat bronchitis.

Essential oils from C. angustifolia have been extracted and are used in antifungal medications. Compounds in the leaves of this plant have also been shown to have potential as antibacterial agents.

== See also ==
- Curcuma aromatica
