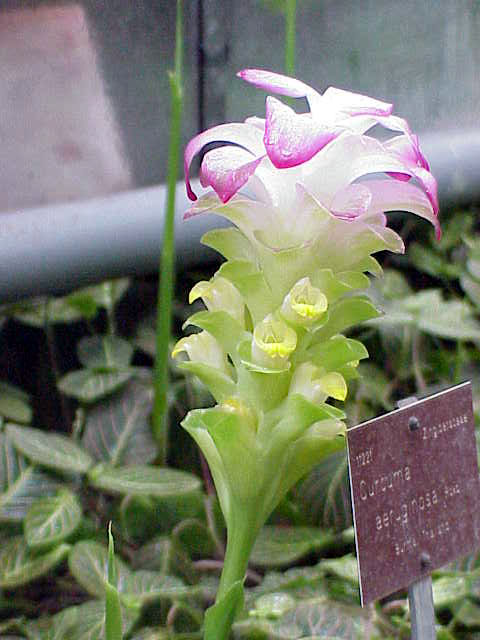

Conservation status
- Least Concern (IUCN 3.1)

Scientific classification
- Kingdom: Plantae
- Clade: Embryophytes
- Clade: Tracheophytes
- Clade: Angiosperms
- Clade: Monocots
- Clade: Commelinids
- Order: Zingiberales
- Family: Zingiberaceae
- Genus: Curcuma
- Species: C. aeruginosa

Binomial name
- Curcuma aeruginosa Roxb.

= Curcuma aeruginosa =

Species of flowering plant

Curcuma aeruginosa is a species of flowering plant in the family Zingiberaceae. It is a perennial herb with pink and yellow flowers, that is native to south Asia. The species was described in 1810, and is listed as of Least Concern by the IUCN.

== Taxonomy ==
The species was described by William Roxburgh in 1810.

== Distribution ==
Curcuma aeruginosa is native to the wet tropical biome of Bangladesh, Cambodia, Java, Laos, Malaysia, Myanmar, Thailand, and Vietnam. It has been introduced to India. The species grows at elevations of 100–259 metres (328–850 ft).

Its extent of occurrence is over 7,000,000 square kilometres (2,700,000 sq mi).

== Description ==
Curcuma aeruginosa is a perennial herb with underground storage organs. The tubers are palmate, and inwardly aeruginous.

The leaves are smooth, broadly lanceolar, and 2–3 feet (61–91 cm) long.

The corolla is yellow, with rose-coloured edges.

== Conservation ==
In 2019, the IUCN assessed Curcuma aeruginosa as of Least Concern.

== Nomenclature ==
In Indonesian, the species is known as temuireng or temu hitam. In Thai, it is known as ว่านมหาเมฆ (wan mhamekh).
