= Curcuma albiflora =

Scientific classification
- Kingdom: Plantae
- Clade: Tracheophytes
- Clade: Angiosperms
- Clade: Monocots
- Clade: Commelinids
- Order: Zingiberales
- Family: Zingiberaceae
- Genus: Curcuma
- Species: C. albiflora

Binomial name
- Curcuma albiflora Thwaites

Species of flowering plant

Curcuma albiflora is a species of flowering plant in the family Zingiberaceae. It is native to Sri Lanka, and was described in 1861.

== Taxonomy ==
The species was described by George Henry Kendrick Thwaites in 1861.

== Distribution ==
Curcuma albiflora is native to the seasonally dry tropical biome of Sri Lanka.

== Description ==
Curcuma albiflora has underground storage organs.
