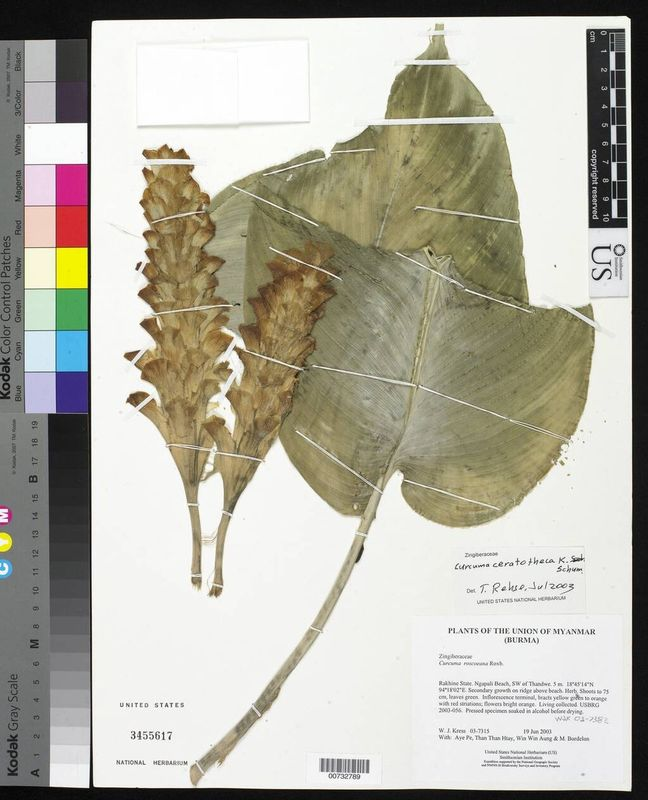

Scientific classification
- Kingdom: Plantae
- Clade: Embryophytes
- Clade: Tracheophytes
- Clade: Spermatophytes
- Clade: Angiosperms
- Clade: Monocots
- Clade: Commelinids
- Order: Zingiberales
- Family: Zingiberaceae
- Genus: Curcuma
- Species: C. ceratotheca

Binomial name
- Curcuma ceratotheca K.Schum.

= Curcuma ceratotheca =

Species of flowering plant

Curcuma ceratotheca is a species of flowering plant in the family Zingiberaceae. The species was described in 1899, and is native to Sulawesi. It has rhizomes.

== Taxonomy ==
The species was described by Karl Moritz Schumann in 1899.

== Distribution ==
Curcuma ceratotheca is native to the wet tropical biome of Sulawesi.

== Description ==
Curcuma ceratotheca has rhizomes and underground storage organs.
