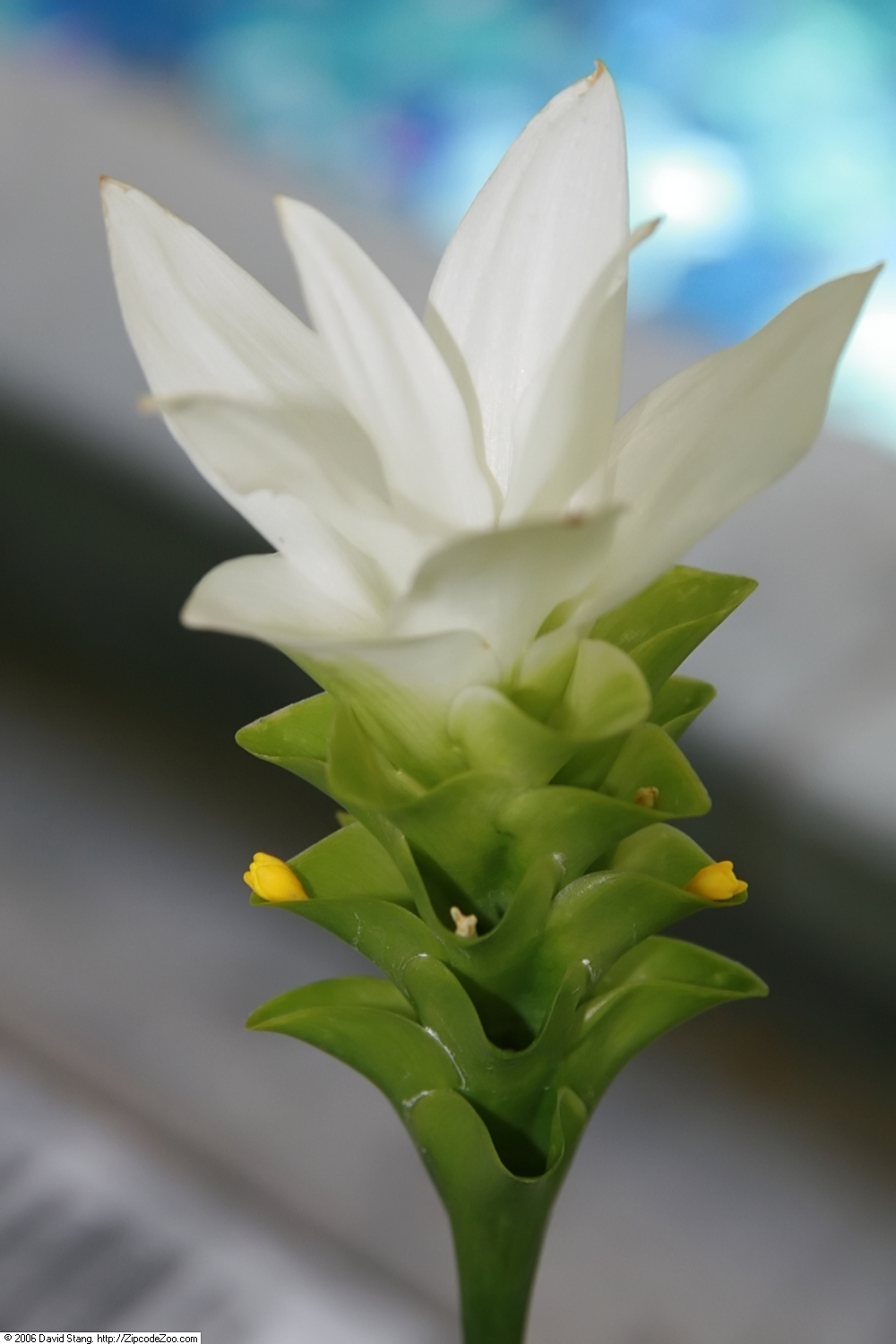

Scientific classification
- Kingdom: Plantae
- Clade: Tracheophytes
- Clade: Angiosperms
- Clade: Monocots
- Clade: Commelinids
- Order: Zingiberales
- Family: Zingiberaceae
- Genus: Curcuma
- Species: C. myanmarensis

Binomial name
- Curcuma myanmarensis (W.J.Kress) Škorničk. (2015)

Synonyms
- Smithatris myanmarensis W.J.Kress (2003)

= Curcuma myanmarensis =

Species of flowering plant

Curcuma myanmarensis is a species of monocotyledonous flowering plant in the ginger family, Zingiberaceae. It is a rhizomatous geophyte endemic to Myanmar (Burma).

The species was first described as Smithatris myanmarensis by Walter John Emil Kress in 2003. It was renamed Curcuma myanmarensis in 2015, when the genus Smithatris was subsumed into the larger genus Curcuma. No subspecies are listed in the Catalog of Life.
