= Curcuma meraukensis =

Scientific classification
- Kingdom: Plantae
- Clade: Tracheophytes
- Clade: Angiosperms
- Clade: Monocots
- Clade: Commelinids
- Order: Zingiberales
- Family: Zingiberaceae
- Genus: Curcuma
- Species: C. meraukensis

Binomial name
- Curcuma meraukensis Valeton

Species of flowering plant

Curcuma meraukensis is a species of flowering plant in the family Zingiberaceae. It is native to New Guinea, and was described in 1913.

== Taxonomy ==
The species was described in 1913, by Theodoric Valeton.

== Distribution ==
Curcuma meraukensis is native to the wet tropical biome of western New Guinea.

== Description ==
Curcuma meraukensis is a perennial, or has underground storage organs.
