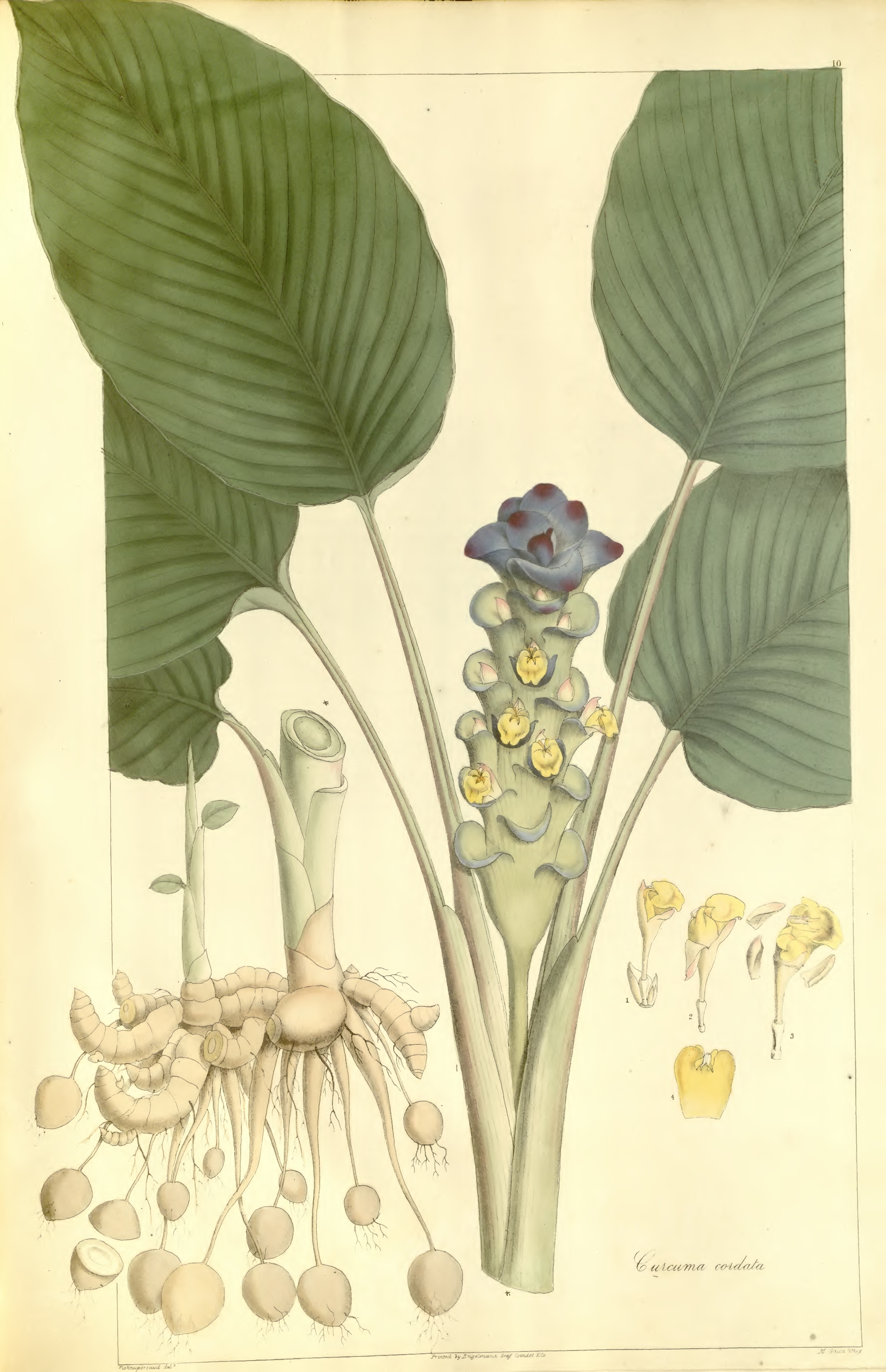
- Illustration from Plantae Asiaticae Rariores

Conservation status
- Data Deficient (IUCN 3.1)

Scientific classification
- Kingdom: Plantae
- Clade: Tracheophytes
- Clade: Angiosperms
- Clade: Monocots
- Clade: Commelinids
- Order: Zingiberales
- Family: Zingiberaceae
- Genus: Curcuma
- Species: C. petiolata

Binomial name
- Curcuma petiolata Roxb.

Synonyms
- Curcuma cordifolia Roxb. (nom. nud.); Curcuma cordata Wall.

= Curcuma petiolata =

Species of plant

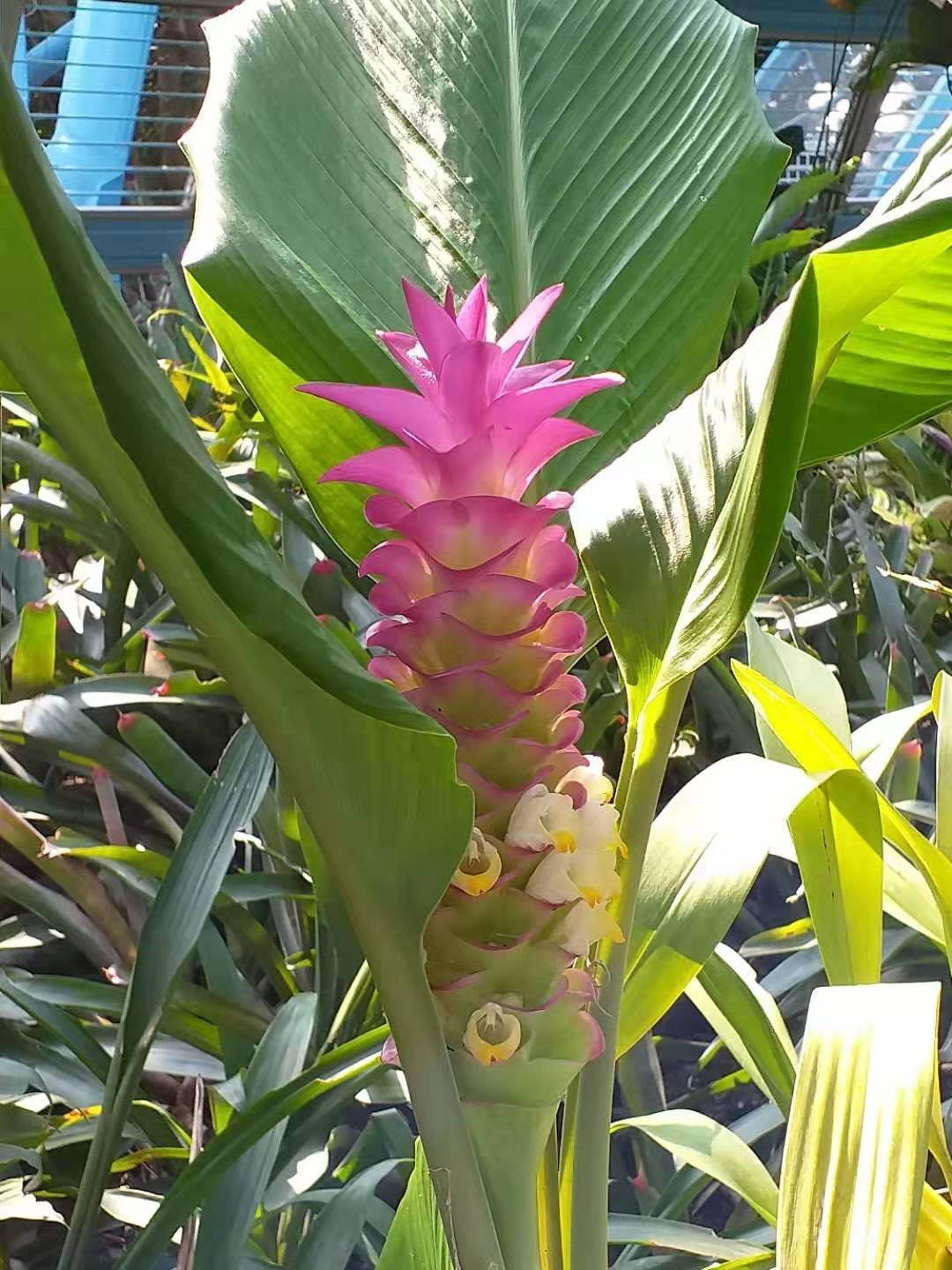
Inflorescence. Botanical Garden of National Museum of Natural Science, Taiwan.

Curcuma petiolata (also known as jewel of Thailand, Siam tulip, hidden ginger, pastel hidden ginger, hidden lily or queen lily) is a plant of the Zingiberaceae or ginger family.

It is native to Thailand, Myanmar, Laos and Java.

Average height 2–3 feet (60–90 cm). Flowers cone-shaped, golden-yellow, pink, white or purple. Blooms June–August. Fertile bracts green, coma bracts pinkish white. Leaves glossy with raised veins, 14 inches (36 cm) long, 5 in (13 cm) wide. Petioles 4–6 in (10–15 cm) long.

Pests include mealybugs.

It is widely cultivated as an ornamental plant for its beautiful flowers. 'Emperor' selection is grown for its attractive variegated foliage as well as its flowers.

Synonyms include Curcuma cordata wall, and the nomen nudum Curcuma cordifolia Roxb.
