= Curcuma supraneeana =

Conservation status
- Critically Endangered (IUCN 3.1)

Scientific classification
- Kingdom: Plantae
- Clade: Tracheophytes
- Clade: Angiosperms
- Clade: Monocots
- Clade: Commelinids
- Order: Zingiberales
- Family: Zingiberaceae
- Genus: Curcuma
- Species: C. supraneeana

Binomial name
- Curcuma supraneeana (W.J.Kress & K.Larsen) Škorničk. (2015)

Synonyms
- Smithatris supraneeanae W.J.Kress & K.Larsen (2001)

Species of flowering plant in the ginger family

Curcuma supraneeana is a species of monocotyledonous flowering plant in the ginger family, Zingiberaceae. It is a rhizomatous geophyte endemic to Thailand. It is known from a single location near Saraburi, central Thailand, where it grows on limestone between 100 and 200 meters (330 and 660 ft) elevation. It has an extent of occurrence (EOO) of only 20 km^{2} (7.7 sq mi). The IUCN assesses the species as critically endangered.

The species was first described as Smithatris supraneanae by Walter John Emil Kress and Kai Larsen, and placed in the new monotypic genus Smithatris. The species and genus' taxonomic name were based on two scientific researchers, Scottish botanist Rosemary M. Smith, and the original person who notified Kress and Larsen of the species, Supranee Kongpichayanond. In 2015 the species was renamed Curcuma supraneeana when genus Smithatris was subsumed into the larger genus Curcuma. No subspecies are listed in the Catalog of Life.
