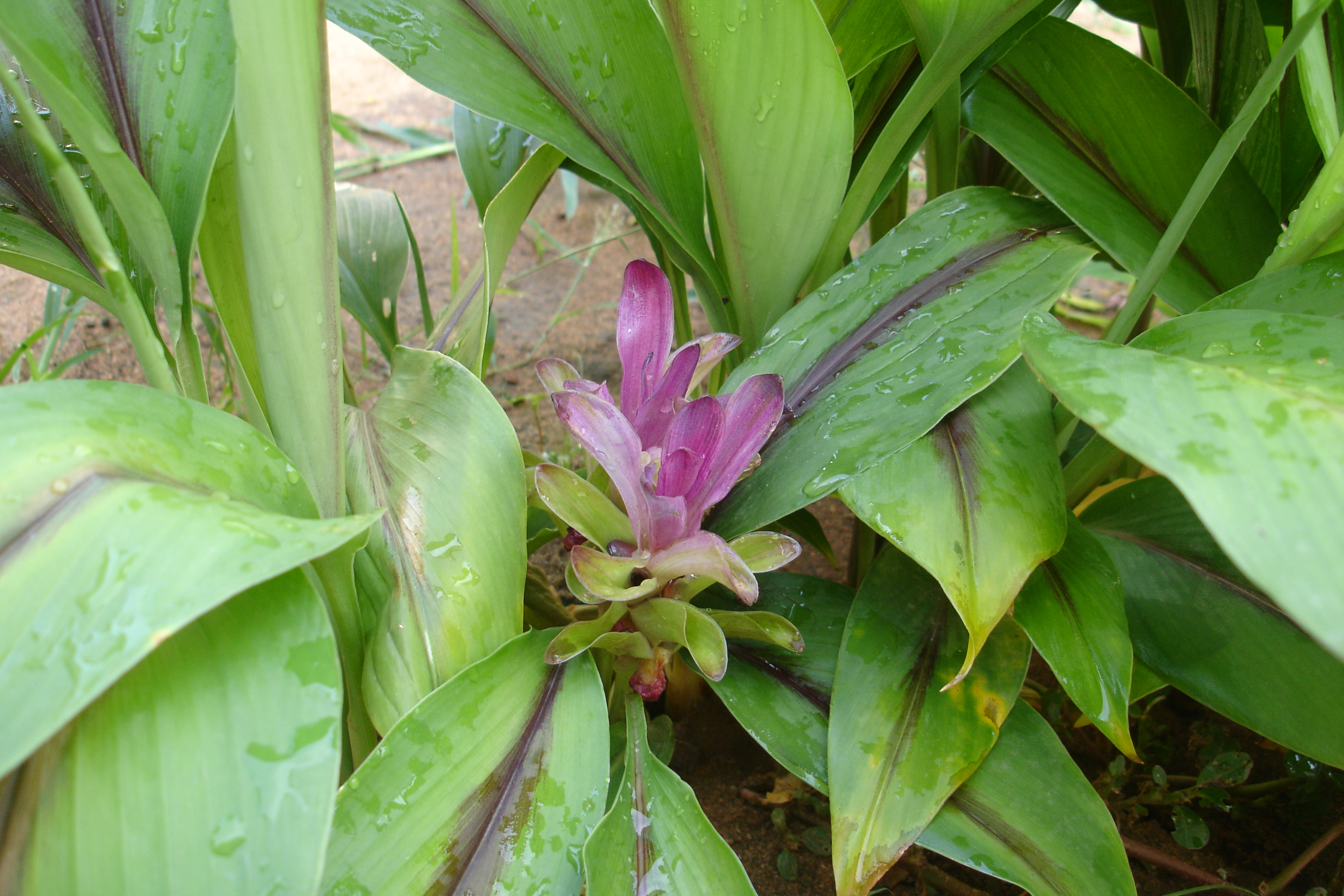

Scientific classification
- Kingdom: Plantae
- Clade: Tracheophytes
- Clade: Angiosperms
- Clade: Monocots
- Clade: Commelinids
- Order: Zingiberales
- Family: Zingiberaceae
- Genus: Curcuma
- Species: C. caesia

Binomial name
- Curcuma caesia Roxb.

Synonyms
- Curcuma kuchoor Royle

= Curcuma caesia =

Species of flowering plant

Curcuma caesia, black turmeric or black zedoary, is a perennial herb with bluish-black rhizomes that is native to northeast India.

== Preparation ==
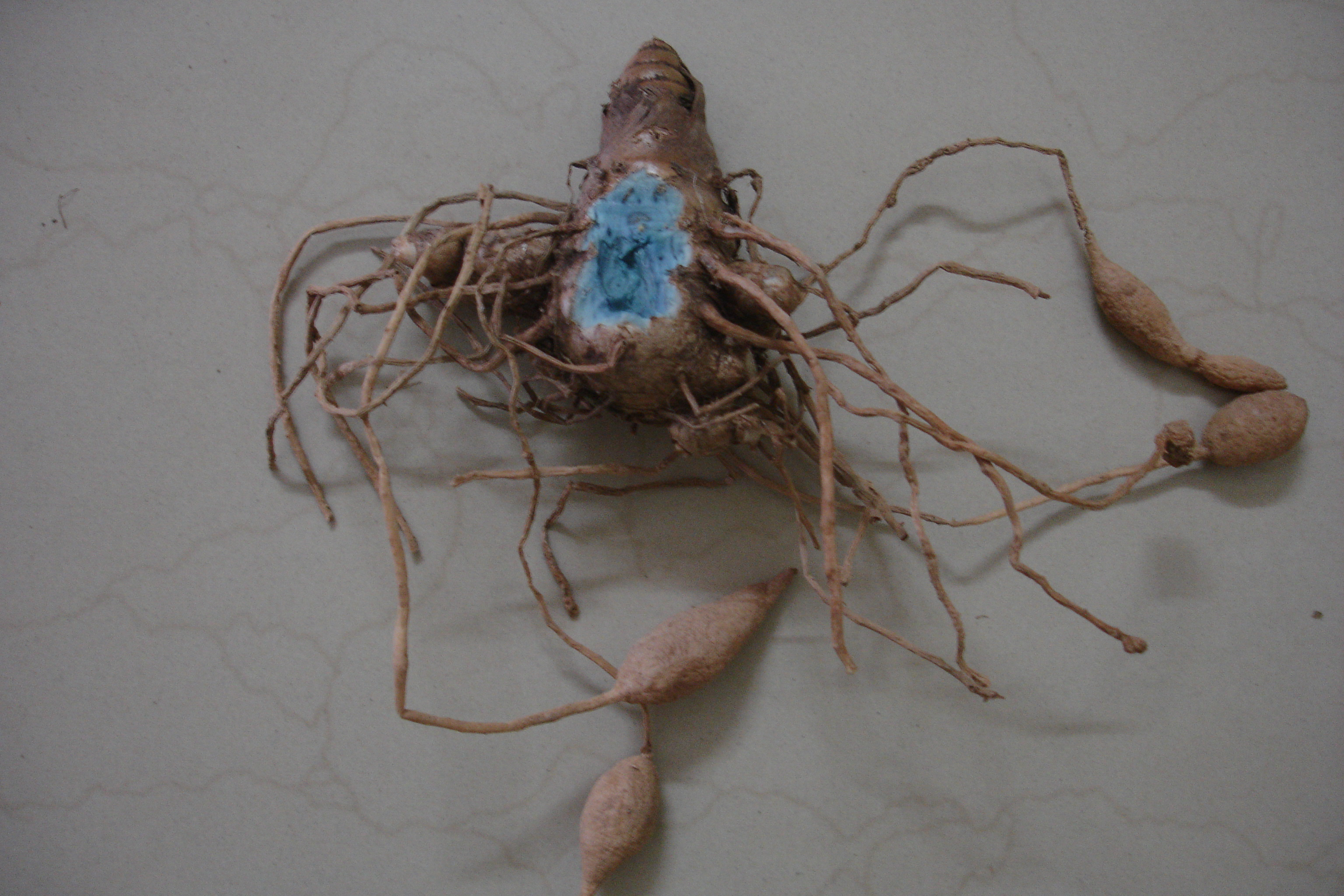
Harvested rhizome

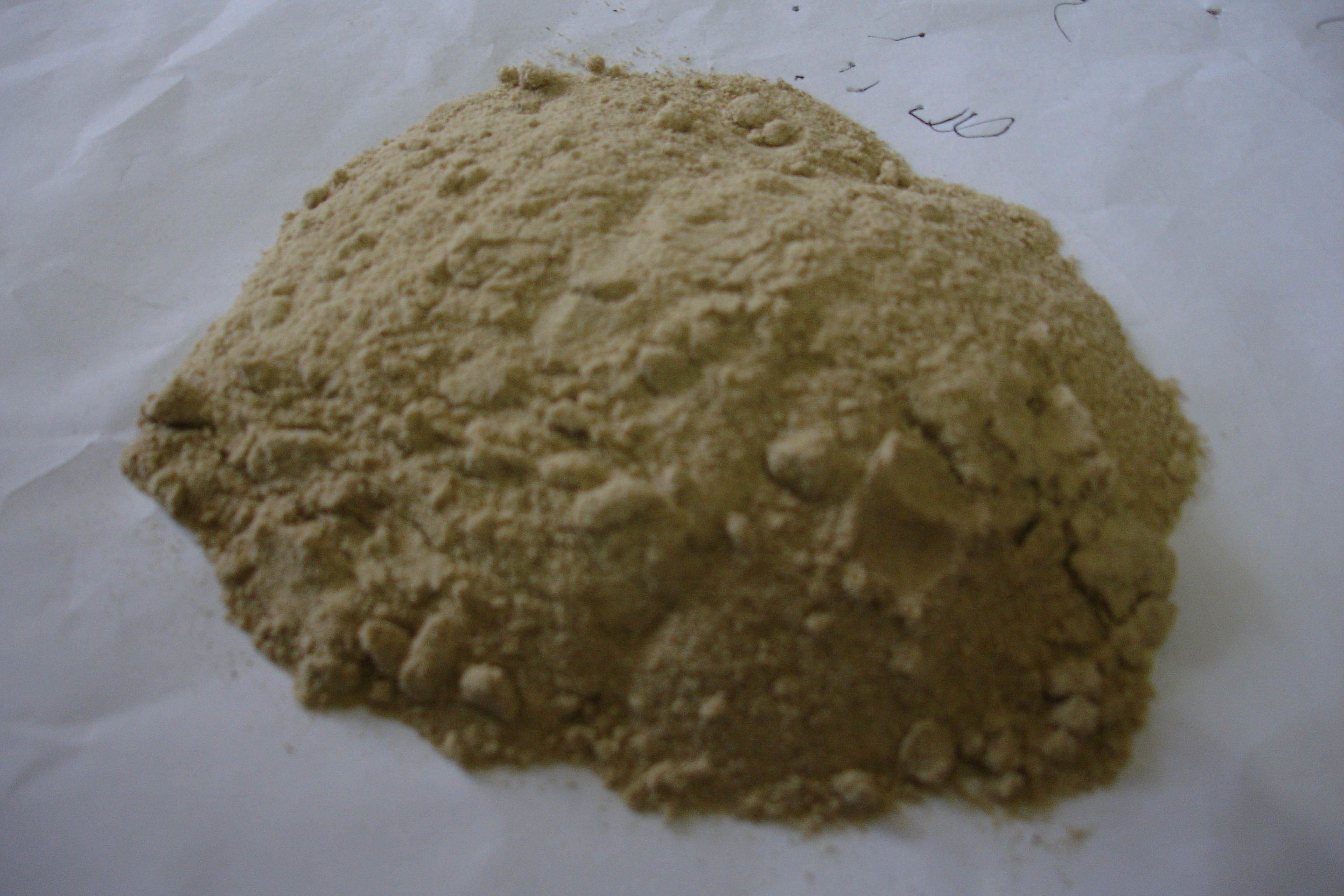
Black turmeric powder

The cultivation and harvest practices are similar to those of common turmeric. In the fields, the rhizomes are washed thoroughly and are placed in a wide mouthed cauldron. The water is poured in the cauldron such that the rhizomes are completely covered. The cauldron is covered with a lid, and the rhizomes are boiled for about 30 minutes until foam oozes out with a strong odour. The rhizomes are taken out when the water is reduced to one-third of the original and they are soft and their inner portion has turned from blue to dark or pale brown. The rhizomes are then dried in hot sun for 10 to 15 days until hardened. These dried rhizomes are then packed for marketing.

== Chemical constituents ==
The research on the volatile rhizome oil of Curcuma caesia resulted in the identification of 30 components, representing 97% of the oil, with camphor (28%), ar-turmerone (12%), (Z)-ocimene (8%), ar-curcumene (7%), 1,8-cineole (5%), elemene (5%), borneol (4%), bornyl acetate (3%) and curcumene (3%) as the major constituents. Other research demonstrated diphenylalkanoids, allylbenzene derivatives, terpenoids, flavonoids, steroids, and alkaloids as major constituents.
