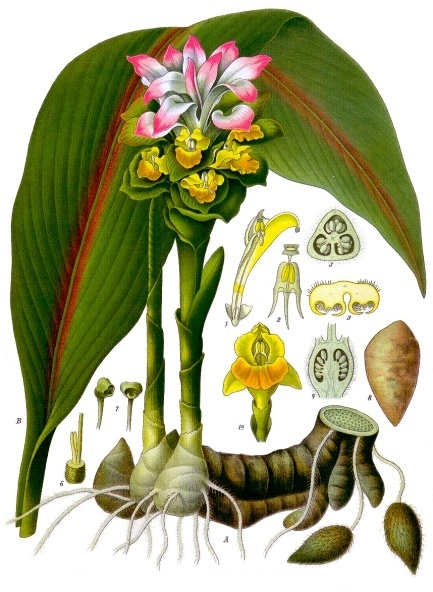
- Curcuma zedoaria: illustration from Köhler's Medizinal-Pflanzen, 1896

Scientific classification
- Kingdom: Plantae
- Clade: Embryophytes
- Clade: Tracheophytes
- Clade: Spermatophytes
- Clade: Angiosperms
- Clade: Monocots
- Clade: Commelinids
- Order: Zingiberales
- Family: Zingiberaceae
- Subfamily: Zingiberoideae
- Tribe: Zingibereae
- Genus: Curcuma; L. nom. cons.

Synonyms
- 11 synonyms: Dischema Voigt; Erndlia Giseke; Hitchenia Wall.; Hitcheniopsis (Baker) Ridl.; Kua Rheede ex Medic.; Laosanthus K.Larsen & Jenjitt.; Paracautleya R.M.Sm.; Smithatris W.J.Kress & K.Larsen; Stahlianthus Kuntze; Stissera Giseke nom. illeg.; Zedoaria Raf. nom. nud.

= Curcuma =

Genus of flowering plants in the ginger family

Curcuma (/ˈkɜːrkjʊmə/) is a genus of plants in the ginger family Zingiberaceae that contains such species as turmeric and Siam tulip. They are native to Southeast Asia, southern China, the Indian Subcontinent, New Guinea and northern Australia. Some species are reportedly naturalized in other warm parts of the world such as tropical Africa, Central America, Florida, and various islands of the Pacific, Indian and Atlantic Oceans. Generally, most curcuma grows well in loose and sandy soil in shaded areas.

== Botanical description ==
Curcuma is a perennial, herbaceous plant that can reach a height of 1 meter (3 ft 3 in). It emits numerous, edible rhizomes whose interiors are yellow or orange. These rhizomes are reduced to a powder, which is the spice called curcuma. Its lanceolate leaves are oblong or elliptical and are of a uniform green, and about 50 cm (20 in) long and 7 to 25 cm (2.8 to 9.8 in) wide.

== Uses ==
The name is derived from the Sanskrit kuṅkuma, referring to turmeric. Turmeric is used to flavour or colour curry powders, mustards, butters, and cheeses; it may also be used as a substitute for saffron or other yellowish pigments.

== Species ==
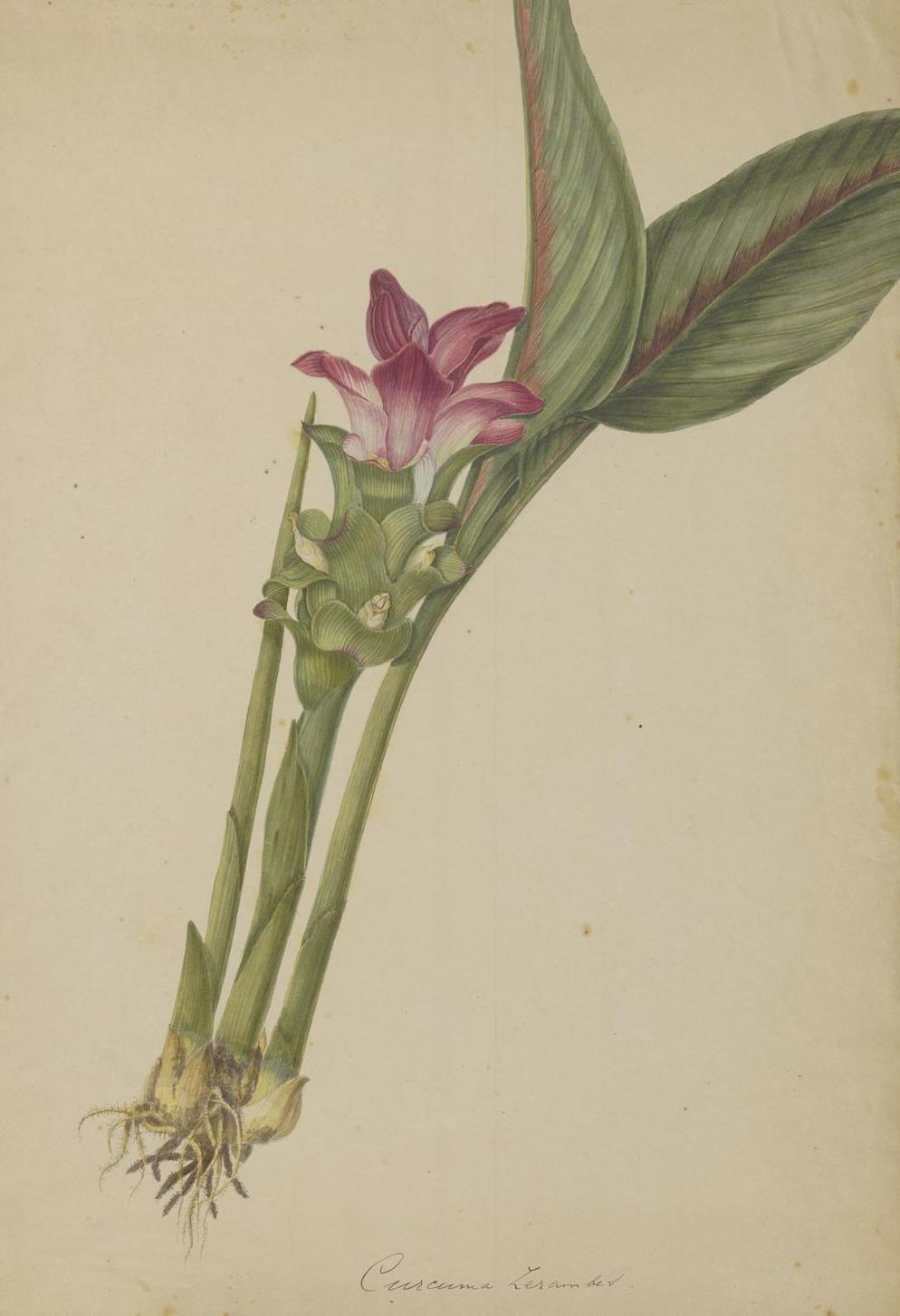
Curcuma euchroma

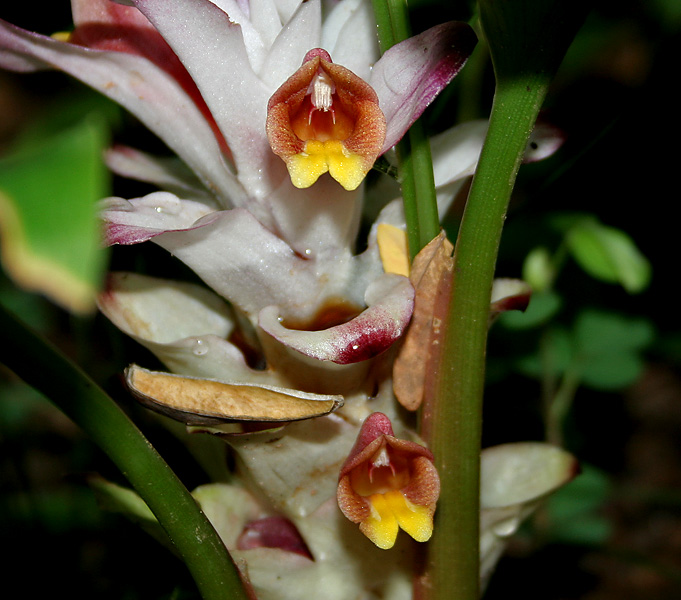
Curcuma inodora

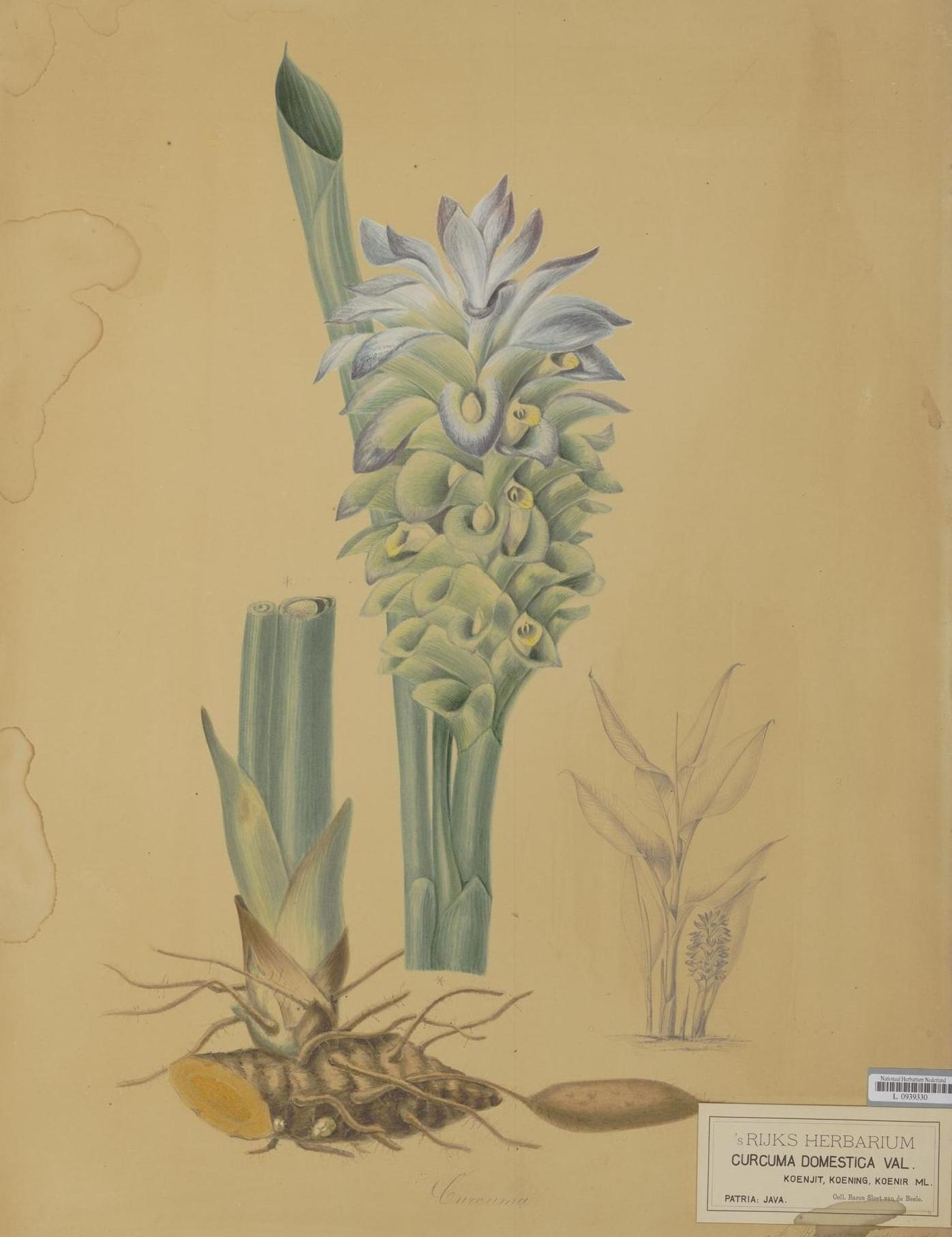
A. Bernecker: Curcuma longa

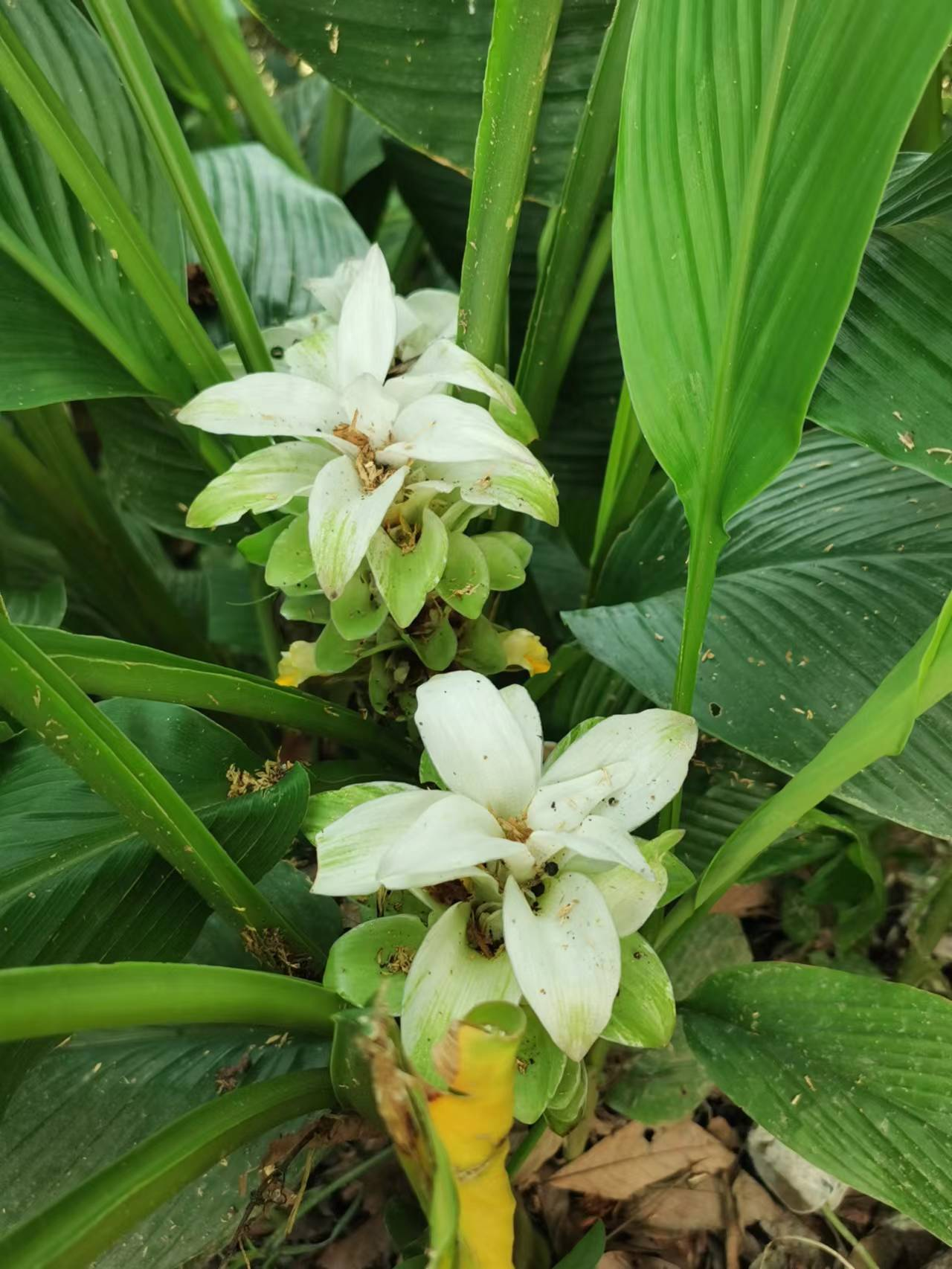
Curcuma longa

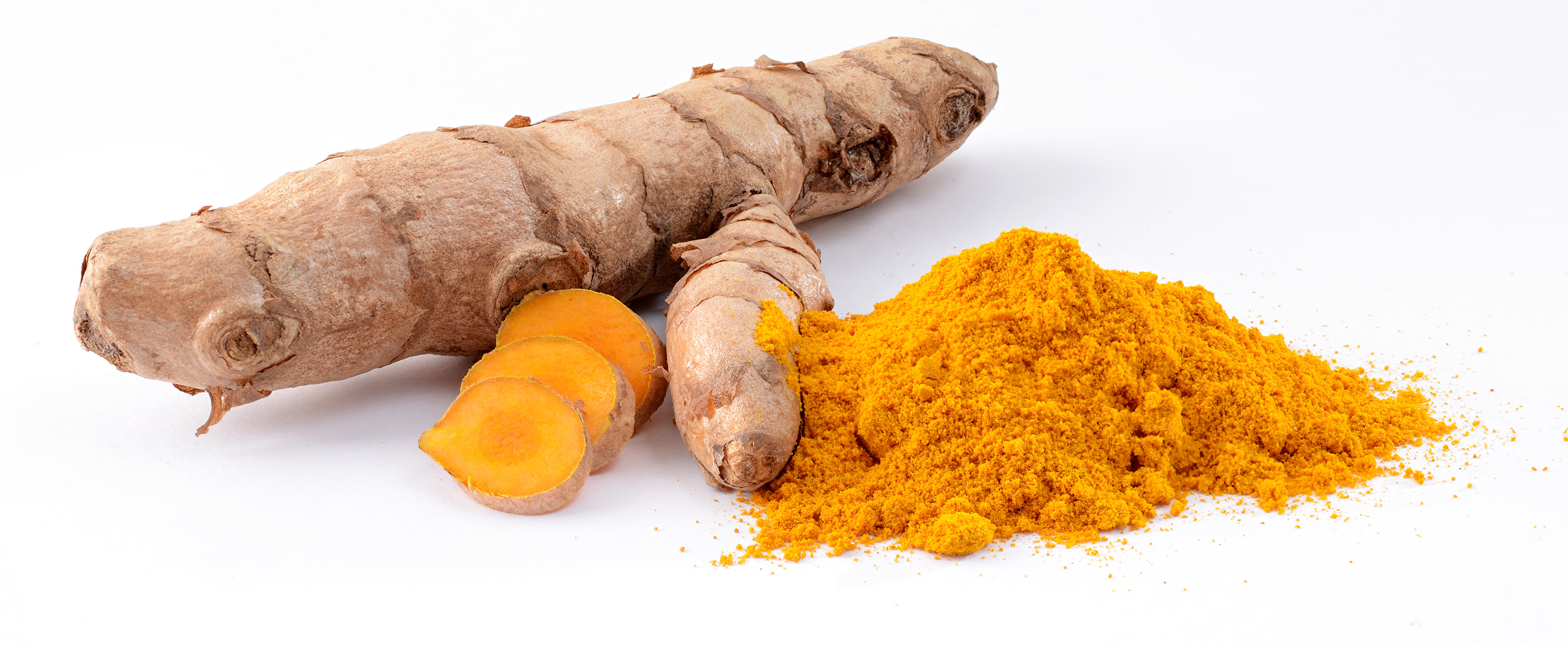
Curcuma rhizome, sections and powder

As of June 2026, Plants of the World Online accepts the following 180 species:

- Curcuma achrae Saensouk & Boonma
- Curcuma aeruginosa Roxb.
- Curcuma albiflora Thwaites
- Curcuma alismatifolia Gagnep.
- Curcuma amada Roxb.
- Curcuma amarissima Roscoe
- Curcuma andersonii (Baker) Škorničk.
- Curcuma angustifolia Roxb.
- Curcuma antinaia Chaveer. & Tanee
- Curcuma arida Škorničk. & N.S.Lý
- Curcuma aromatica Salisb.
- Curcuma arracanensis W.J.Kress & V.Gowda
- Curcuma aruna Maknoi & Saensouk
- Curcuma attenuata Wall. ex Baker
- Curcuma aurantiaca Zijp
- Curcuma australasica Hook.f.
- Curcuma bakeriana Hemsl.
- Curcuma bella Maknoi, K.Larsen & Sirirugsa
- Curcuma bhatii (R.M.Sm.) Škorničk. & M.Sabu
- Curcuma bicolor Mood & K.Larsen
- Curcuma borealis Saensouk, P.Saensouk & Boonma
- Curcuma caesia Roxb.
- Curcuma campanulata (Kuntze) Škorničk.
- Curcuma candida (Wall.) Techapr. & Škorničk.
- Curcuma cannanorensis R.Ansari, V.J.Nair & N.C.Nair
- Curcuma caulina J.Graham
- Curcuma ceratotheca K.Schum.
- Curcuma chantaranothaii Boonma & Saensouk
- Curcuma charanii Boonma & Saensouk
- Curcuma cinnabarina Škorničk. & Soonthornk.
- Curcuma clovisii Škorničk.
- Curcuma cochinchinensis Gagnep.
- Curcuma codonantha Škorničk., M.Sabu & Prasanthk.
- Curcuma coerulea K.Schum.
- Curcuma colorata Valeton
- Curcuma comosa Roxb.
- Curcuma cordata Wall.
- Curcuma coriacea Mangaly & M.Sabu
- Curcuma corniculata Škorničk.
- Curcuma cotuana Luu, Škorničk. & H.Ð.Trần
- Curcuma daknongensis D.D.Nguyen
- Curcuma decipiens Dalzell
- Curcuma diversicolor Soonthornk.
- Curcuma eburnea Škorničk., Suksathan & Soonthornk.
- Curcuma ecomata Craib
- Curcuma elata Roxb.
- Curcuma euchroma Valeton
- Curcuma exigua N.Liu
- Curcuma ferruginea Roxb.
- Curcuma fimbriata Škorničk. & Soonthornk.
- Curcuma flammea Škorničk.
- Curcuma flaviflora S.Q.Tong
- Curcuma glandulosa Thwe, M.M.Aung & Nob.Tanaka
- Curcuma glans K.Larsen & Mood
- Curcuma glauca (Wall.) Škorničk.
- Curcuma globulifera Škorničk. & Soonthornk.
- Curcuma gracillima Gagnep.
- Curcuma graminifolia (K.Larsen & Jenjitt.) Škorničk.
- Curcuma grandiflora Wall. ex Baker
- Curcuma gulinqingensis N.H.Xia & Juan Chen
- Curcuma haritha Mangaly & M.Sabu
- Curcuma harmandii Gagnep.
- Curcuma heyneana Valeton & Zijp
- Curcuma ignea Ruchis. & Jenjitt.
- Curcuma inodora Blatt.
- Curcuma involucrata (King ex Baker) Škorničk.
- Curcuma kakchingensis Laishram, Kishor & G.J.Sharma
- Curcuma karnatakensis Amalraj, Velay. & Mural.
- Curcuma kayahensis Nob.Tanaka & M.M.Aung
- Curcuma kudagensis Velay., V.S.Pillai & Amalraj
- Curcuma kwangsiensis S.G.Lee & C.F.Liang
- Curcuma lampangensis Saensouk, Maknoi & Rakarcha
- Curcuma latiflora Valeton
- Curcuma latifolia Roscoe
- Curcuma leonidii Škorničk. & Luu
- Curcuma leucorrhiza Roxb.
- Curcuma lindstromii Škorničk. & Soonthornk.
- Curcuma lithophila Škorničk. & Soonthornk.
- Curcuma loerzingii Valeton
- Curcuma longa L.
- Curcuma longispica Valeton
- Curcuma macrochlamys (Baker) Škorničk.
- Curcuma mangga Valeton & Zijp
- Curcuma maxwellii Škorničk. & Suksathan
- Curcuma meraukensis Valeton
- Curcuma micrantha Škorničk. & Soonthornk.
- Curcuma montana Roxb.
- Curcuma mukhraniae R.Kr.Singh & Arti Garg
- Curcuma mutabilis Škorničk., M.Sabu & Prasanthk.
- Curcuma myanmarensis (W.J.Kress) Škorničk.
- Curcuma nakhonphanomensis Boonma, Saensouk & P.Saensouk
- Curcuma nankunshanensis N.Liu, X.B.Ye & Juan Chen
- Curcuma neilgherrensis Wight
- Curcuma nepalensis M.Sabu, Kasaju & S.Subedi
- Curcuma newmanii Škorničk.
- Curcuma nivea Saensouk, P.Saensouk & Boonma
- Curcuma oligantha Trimen
- Curcuma ornata Wall. ex Baker
- Curcuma pambrosima Škorničk. & N.S.Lý
- Curcuma papilionacea Soonthornk., Ongsakul & Škorničk.
- Curcuma parviflora Wall.
- Curcuma parvula Gage
- Curcuma pedicellata (Chaveer. & Mokkamul) Škorničk.
- Curcuma peninsularis Saensouk, P.Saensouk, Maknoi & Boonma
- Curcuma peramoena Souvann. & Maknoi
- Curcuma petiolata Roxb.
- Curcuma phaeocaulis Valeton
- Curcuma phrayawan Boonma & Saensouk
- Curcuma picta Roxb. ex Škorničk.
- Curcuma pierreana Gagnep.
- Curcuma pitukii Maknoi, Saensouk, Rakarcha & Thammar.
- Curcuma plicata Wall. ex Baker
- Curcuma prakasha S.Tripathi
- Curcuma prasina Škorničk.
- Curcuma princeps Soonthornk. & Škorničk.
- Curcuma pseudomontana J.Graham
- Curcuma puangpeniae Boonma & Saensouk
- Curcuma pulcherrima Boonma, Saensouk & P.Saensouk
- Curcuma purpurascens Blume
- Curcuma purpurata Boonma & Saensouk
- Curcuma putii Maknoi & Jenjitt.
- Curcuma pygmaea Škorničk. & Šída f.
- Curcuma rangjued Saensouk & Boonma
- Curcuma rangsimae Boonma & Saensouk
- Curcuma reclinata Roxb.
- Curcuma retrocalcaria Saensouk, P.Saensouk & Boonma
- Curcuma rhabdota Sirirugsa & M.F.Newman
- Curcuma rhomba Mood & K.Larsen
- Curcuma roscoeana Wall.
- Curcuma rosea P.Saensouk, Saensouk & Boonma
- Curcuma roseobracteata P.Saensouk, Saensouk, Maknoi & Boonma
- Curcuma roxburghii M.A.Rahman & Yusuf
- Curcuma rubescens Roxb.
- Curcuma rubroaurantiaca Škorničk. & Soonthornk.
- Curcuma rubrobracteata Škorničk., M.Sabu & Prasanthk.
- Curcuma rufostriata Škorničk. & Soonthornk.
- Curcuma ruiliensis N.H.Xia & Juan Chen
- Curcuma sabhasrii Saensouk, Maknoi, Wongnak & Rakarcha
- Curcuma sahuynhensis Škorničk. & N.S.Lý
- Curcuma saraburiensis Boonma & Saensouk
- Curcuma sattayasaiorum Chaveer. & Sudmoon
- Curcuma scaposa (Nimmo) Škorničk. & M.Sabu
- Curcuma sessilis Gage
- Curcuma siamensis Saensouk & Boonma
- Curcuma sichuanensis X.X.Chen
- Curcuma singularis Gagnep.
- Curcuma sirirugsae Saensouk & Rakarcha
- Curcuma sixsensesensis D.D.Nguyen & T.A.Le
- Curcuma sparganiifolia Gagnep.
- Curcuma spathulata Škorničk. & Soonthornk.
- Curcuma stahlianthoides Škorničk. & Soonthornk.
- Curcuma stenochila Gagnep.
- Curcuma stolonifera Nob.Tanaka, K.Armstr. & M.M.Aung
- Curcuma strobilifera Wall. ex Baker
- Curcuma sumatrana Miq.
- Curcuma sumonii Saensouk, P.Saensouk, Boonma & Techa
- Curcuma suphanensis P.Saensouk, Boonma, Rakarcha, Maknoi, Wongnak & Saensouk
- Curcuma supraneeana (W.J.Kress & K.Larsen) Škorničk.
- Curcuma suraponii Boonma
- Curcuma sylvatica Valeton
- Curcuma thorelii Gagnep.
- Curcuma tongii Y.H.Tan & Li X.Zhang
- Curcuma trichosantha Gagnep.
- Curcuma tuanii H.T.Nguyen, D.D.Nguyen & N.A.Nguyen
- Curcuma ubonensis Boonma, Saensouk, Maknoi & P.Saensouk
- Curcuma ungmensis M.Sabu, Hareesh & Tiatemsu
- Curcuma vamana M.Sabu & Mangaly
- Curcuma vinhlinhensis D.D.Nguyen & T.A.Le
- Curcuma viridiflora Roxb.
- Curcuma vitellina Škorničk. & H.Ð.Tran
- Curcuma wallichii M.A.Rahman & Yusuf
- Curcuma wanchaii Saensouk, P.Saensouk, Maknoi & Boonma
- Curcuma wanenlueanga Saensouk, Thomudtha & Boonma
- Curcuma woodii N.H.Xia & Juan Chen
- Curcuma xanthella Škorničk.
- Curcuma yingdeensis N.H.Xia & Juan Chen
- Curcuma yunnanensis N.Liu & S.J.Chen
- Curcuma zanthorrhiza Roxb.
- Curcuma zedoaria (Christm.) Roscoe
- Curcuma zedoarioides Chaveer. & Tanee

== Gallery ==
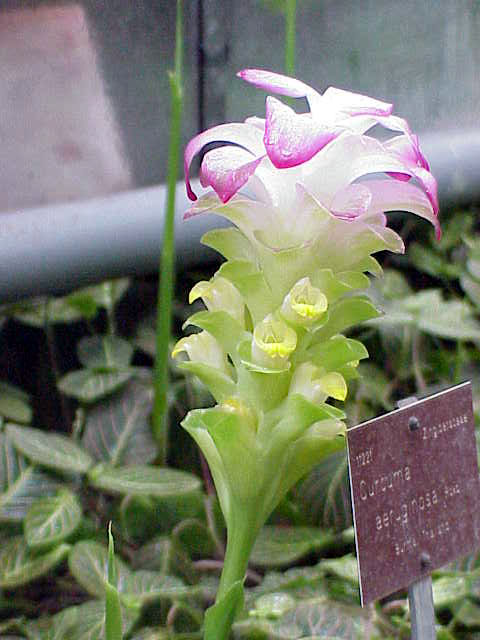
Curcuma aeruginosa

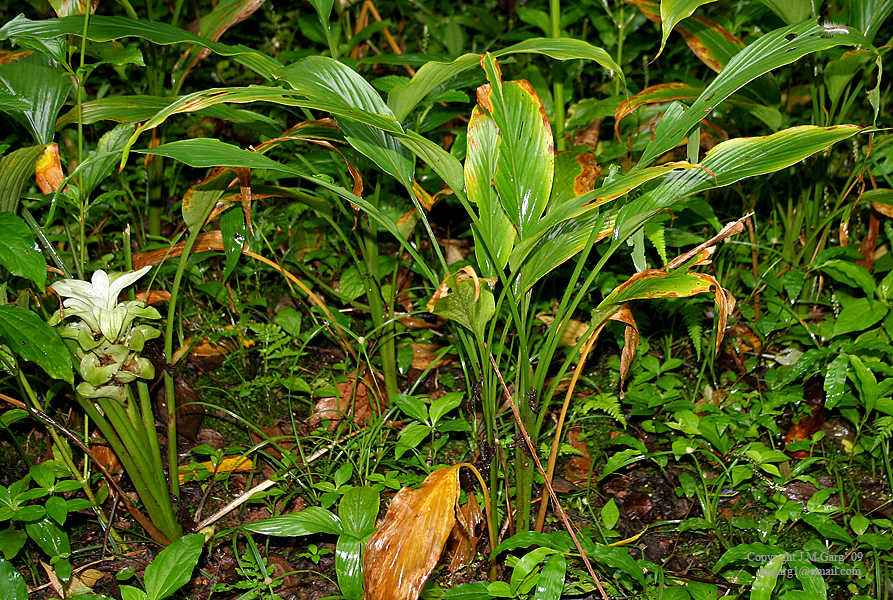
Curcuma longa

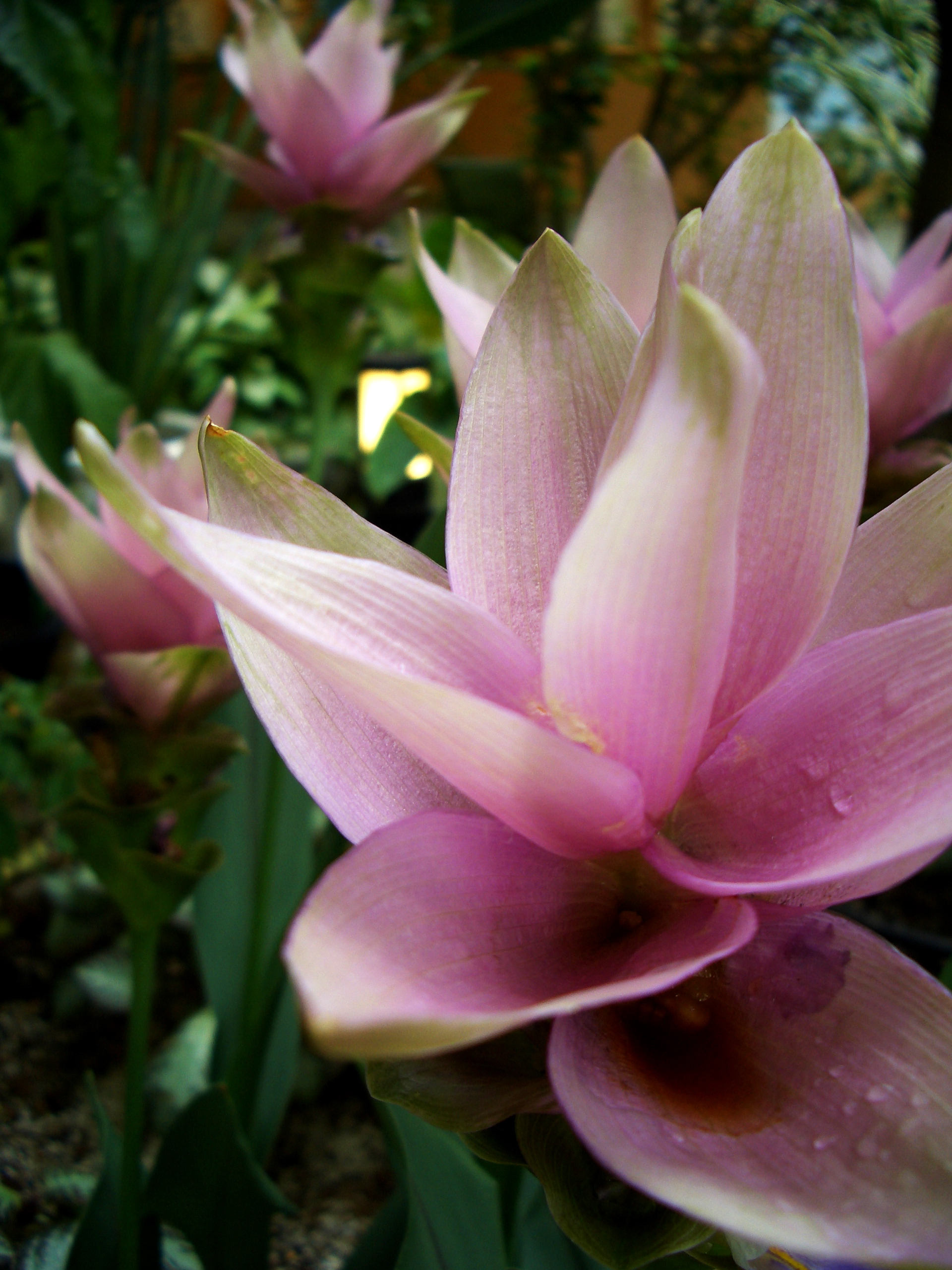
Curcuma sp.

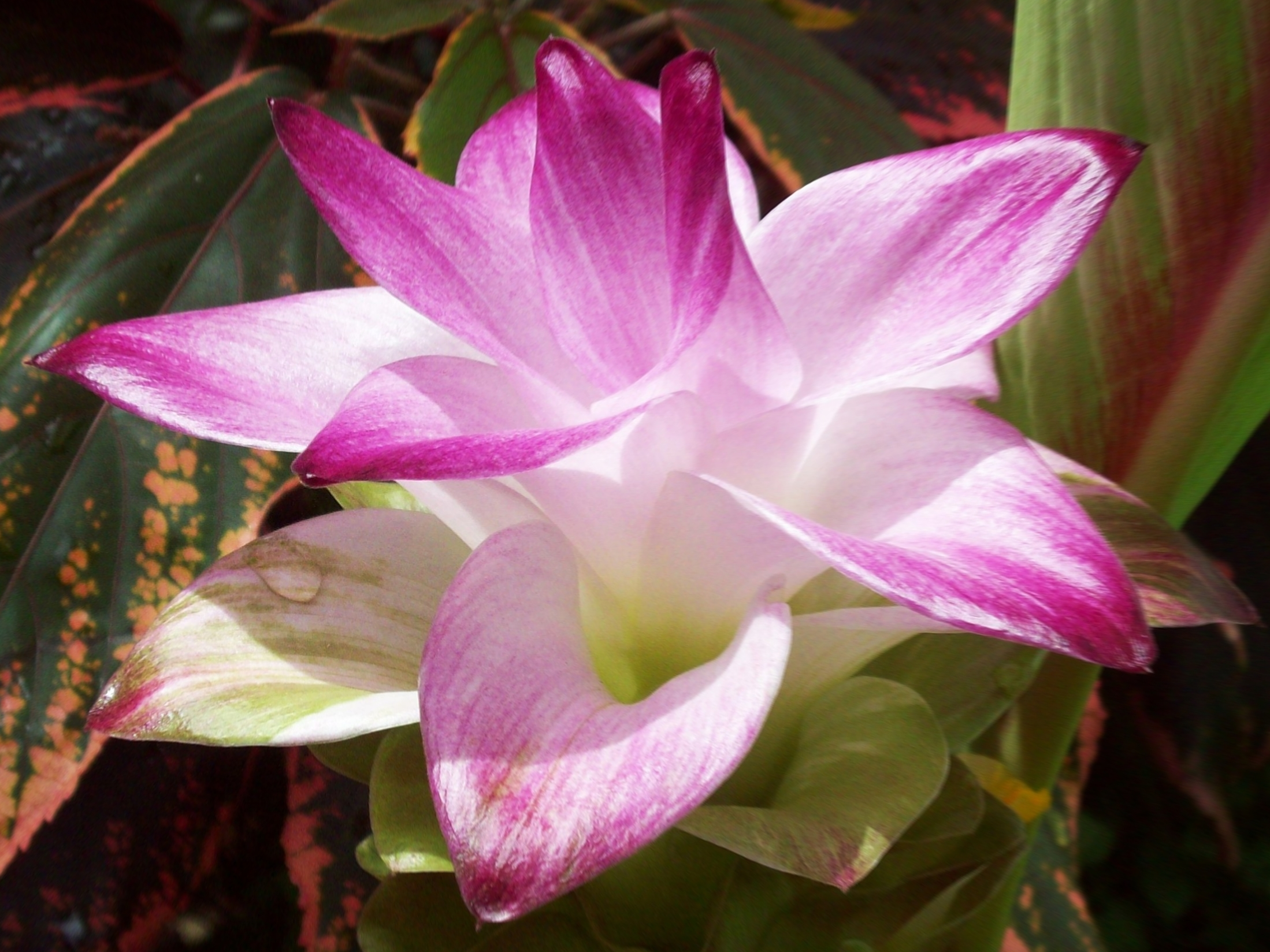
Curcuma sp.
