= Curcuma comosa =

Scientific classification
- Kingdom: Plantae
- Clade: Tracheophytes
- Clade: Angiosperms
- Clade: Monocots
- Clade: Commelinids
- Order: Zingiberales
- Family: Zingiberaceae
- Genus: Curcuma
- Species: C. comosa

Binomial name
- Curcuma comosa Roxb.

Species of flowering plant

Curcuma comosa is a species of flowering plant in the ginger family. It is native to much of Asia, including Thailand, Indonesia, and Malaysia. The herb is cultivated in Thailand, especially in the Northern Province, including Petchaboon, and the Northeastern Province, including Loei. Curcuma comosa is widely used as a traditional herbal remedy.

== Research ==
Studies in Thailand researched the effects of crude extract from the root of Curcuma comosa on the uterus of the rat as compared to female estradiol hormone. Results reported included an increase in the thickness of the uterus epithelial cells lining the vagina and improved growth and induction of keratin synthesis in the mucous membrane of the vagina. However, estrogenic activities of Curcuma comosa were milder than those of estradiol.

Methanolic extract of rhizome of C. comosa has been proven to kill the roundworm Caenorhabditis elegans. The extract was purified to its active ingredients and it was found that some diphenylheptanoid compounds, such as 1,7-diphenyl-3-acetoxy-hept-trans-6-ene, can inhibit the motility of the roundworm.

Butanolic and ethyl acetate extract of rhizome of C. comosa had a stimulative effect on bile secretion and a decrease in blood cholesterol was reported. Separation of the active ingredients from diarylheptanoids and phloracetophenone glucoside compounds were carried out and some active compounds, such as 1,7-diphenyl-5-hydroxy-(1E)-1-heptene and 4,6-dihydroxy-2-o-(b-D-glucopyranosyl) acetophenone, were found to have a stimulative effect on bile secretion in rats.

A 95% ethanol extract of C. comosa decreased uterine smooth muscle contraction in rats.

An ethyl acetate extract of the rhizome was orally administered to male sheep and hamsters and a decrease in cholesterol and triglyceride were reported.
