= Curcuma neilgherrensis =

Scientific classification
- Kingdom: Plantae
- Clade: Tracheophytes
- Clade: Angiosperms
- Clade: Monocots
- Clade: Commelinids
- Order: Zingiberales
- Family: Zingiberaceae
- Genus: Curcuma
- Species: C. neilgherrensis

Binomial name
- Curcuma neilgherrensis Wight

Synonyms
- Curcuma angustifolia Dalzell & A.Gibson

Species of flowering plant

Curcuma neilgherrensis, commonly known as Nilgiri turmeric, is a species of flowering plant in the family Zingiberaceae. It is native to south Asia, and was described in 1853.

== Taxonomy ==
The species was described by Robert Wight in 1853.

== Distribution ==
Curcuma neilgherrensis is native to the seasonally dry tropical biome of India, Laos, and Myanmar.

== Description ==
Curcuma neilgherrensis is a perennial or has underground rhizomes.
