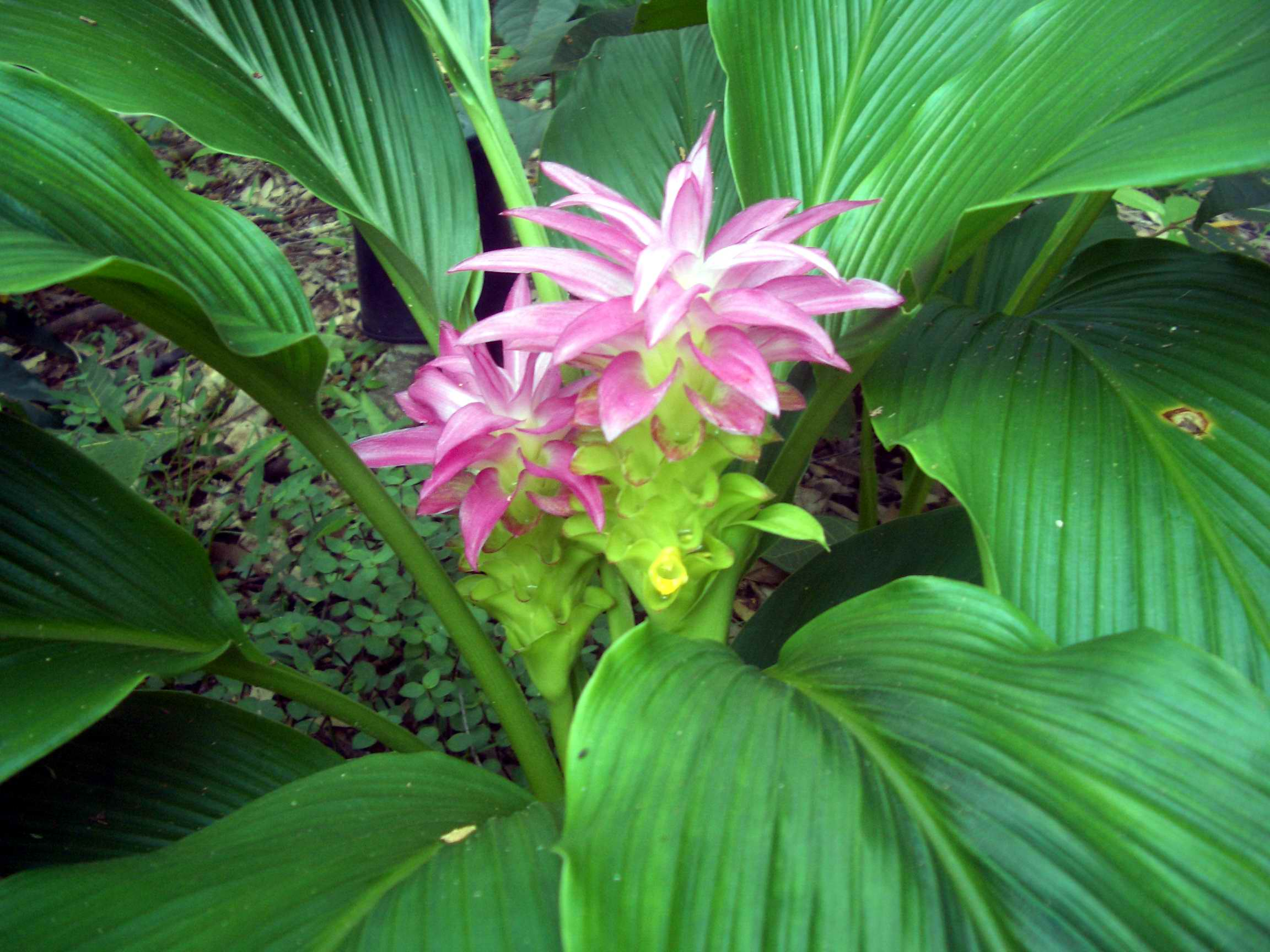
- Curcuma australasica, native turmeric.

Scientific classification
- Kingdom: Plantae
- Clade: Tracheophytes
- Clade: Angiosperms
- Clade: Monocots
- Clade: Commelinids
- Order: Zingiberales
- Family: Zingiberaceae
- Genus: Curcuma
- Species: C. australasica

Binomial name
- Curcuma australasica Hook. f.

= Curcuma australasica =

Native turmeric

Species of flowering plant

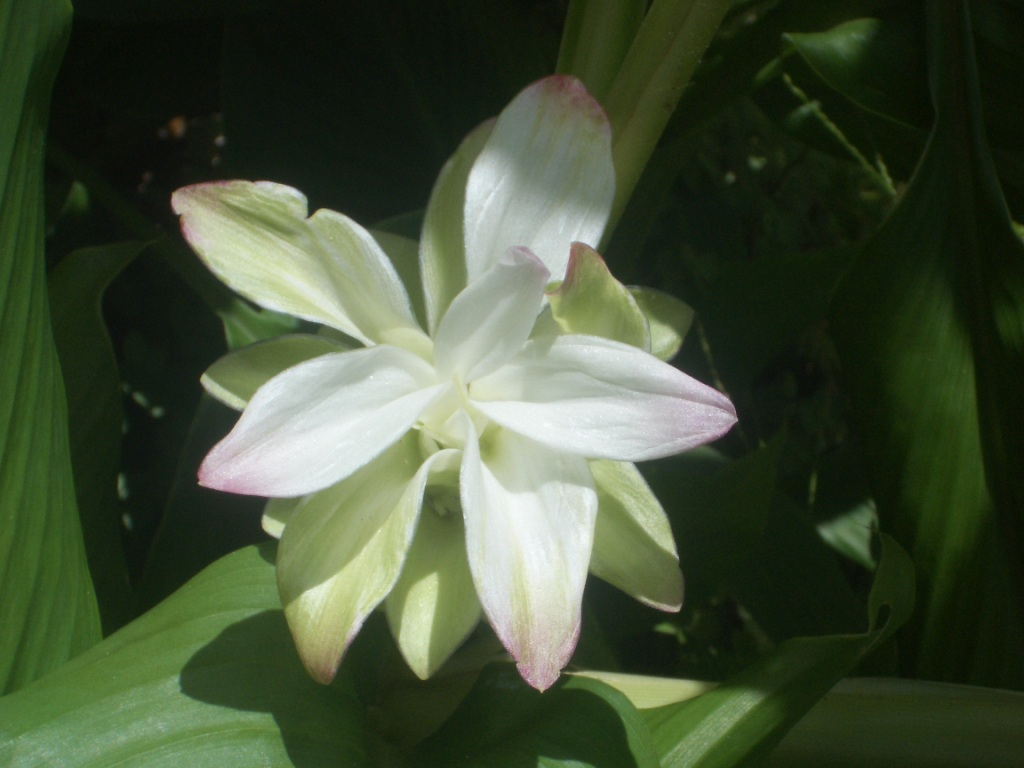
Rare white native turmeric

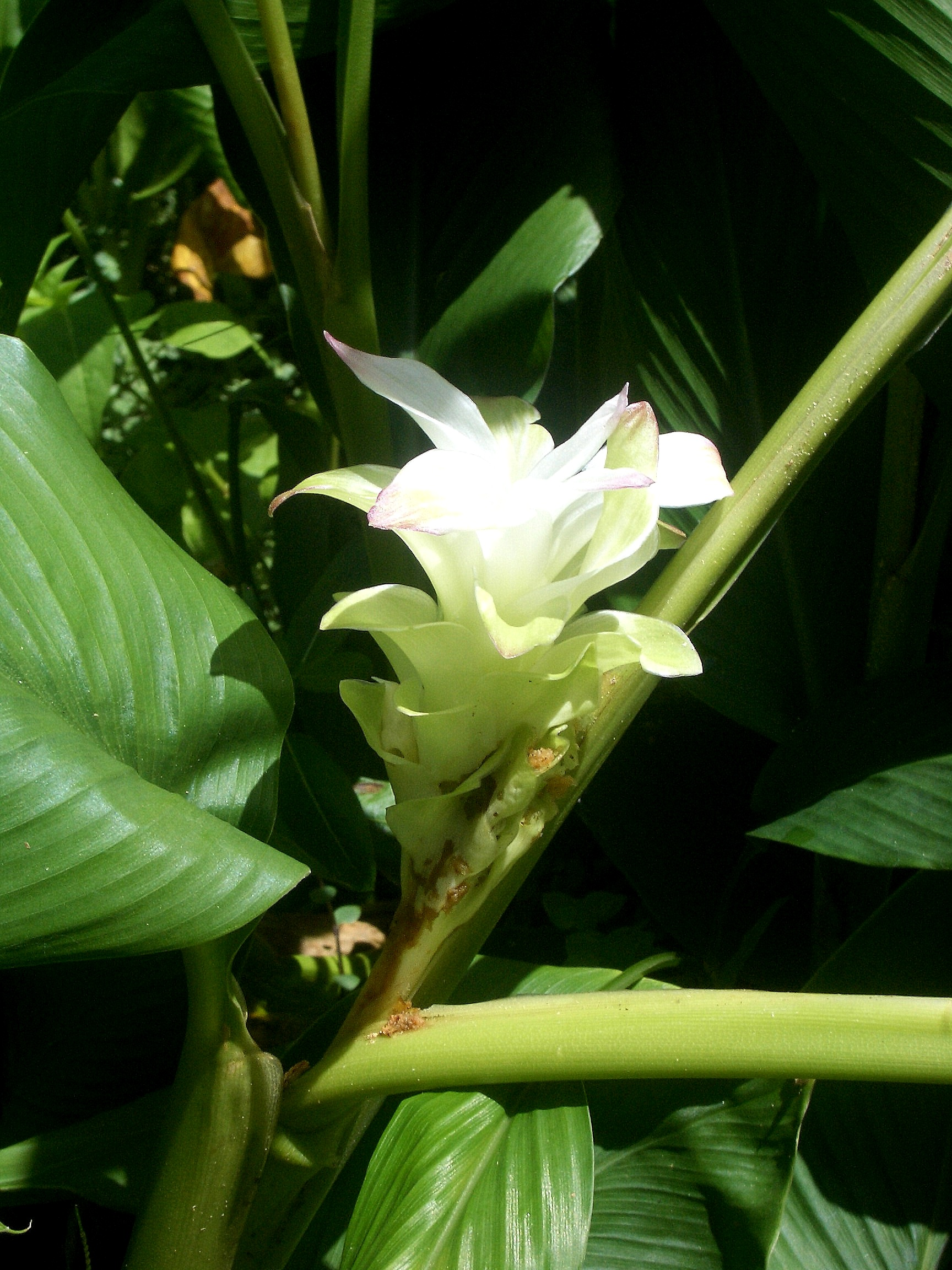
White native turmeric side view

Curcuma australasica, the native turmeric, wild turmeric, or Cape York lily, is a rhizomatous herbaceous perennial plant of the Zingiberaceae or ginger family.

== Nomenclature ==
Curcuma - from the Sanskrit name for turmeric, kuṅkuma.
australasica - for Australian.

== Description ==
Curcuma australasica is the only Australian native of the 100 or more species of Curcuma found world-wide. It occurs on Cape York Peninsula in Queensland, a few areas in the Northern Territory and in Papua New Guinea. It is typically found growing in moist pockets in sandstone areas, and in wet woodland and forest areas. It grows well in containers where it is often cultivated for its very beautiful, long-lasting flower. C. australasica can be propagated by division, and prefers to be well-watered in summer and allowed to dry in winter, in correspondence with Monsoonal patterns.

It is grown for its flowers in Zimbabwe, and a cultivated variety called "Aussie Plume" is grown in the US which can grow up to 6 ft (almost 2 metres) tall.

The native form is usually less than 500 mm (20 in) tall, with long green leaves (140-450 x 60–190 mm), pleated. Flowers 15–20 mm, November to March in Queensland, normally yellow on a spike with pink, red, mauve or green bracts. Occasionally a white form is found in the wild - see accompanying photograph.

The Aboriginal Gugu Yimithirr language name is kumbigi. Aboriginal people in the Cape York Peninsula area traditionally roasted and ate the rhizomes of this plant.

IUCN Red List status: not evaluated, but very common and widespread in Queensland.
