= Curcuma phaeocaulis =

Scientific classification
- Kingdom: Plantae
- Clade: Embryophytes
- Clade: Tracheophytes
- Clade: Spermatophytes
- Clade: Angiosperms
- Clade: Monocots
- Clade: Commelinids
- Order: Zingiberales
- Family: Zingiberaceae
- Genus: Curcuma
- Species: C. phaeocaulis

Binomial name
- Curcuma phaeocaulis Valeton

Species of flowering plant in the ginger family

Curcuma phaeocaulis is a species of flowering plant in the ginger family. It was first described by Theodoric Valeton.

== Range ==
It is native to Java, Vietnam, and Yunnan. It is also cultivated in the Chinese provinces of Fujian, Guangdong, Guangxi, and Sichuan.
