= Joachim Otto Voigt =

German-Danish botanist and surgeon (1798–1843)

Joachim Otto Voigt (22 March 1798, in Nordborg, on the island of Als – 22 June 1843, in London) was a Danish and German botanist and surgeon specializing in seed plants and pteridophytes.

In 1826 he was assigned regimental surgeon in Frederiksnagore, Danish India, where in 1834 he was appointed manager of its botanical garden. From 1841 to 1843 he was manager of the botanical garden in Calcutta. He died of illness in London on his voyage back to Denmark.

He was the author of Hortus suburbanus Calcuttensis (1845), a catalog of plants in East India Company's botanical garden at Calcutta as well as plants in the botanical garden at Frederiksnagore.
