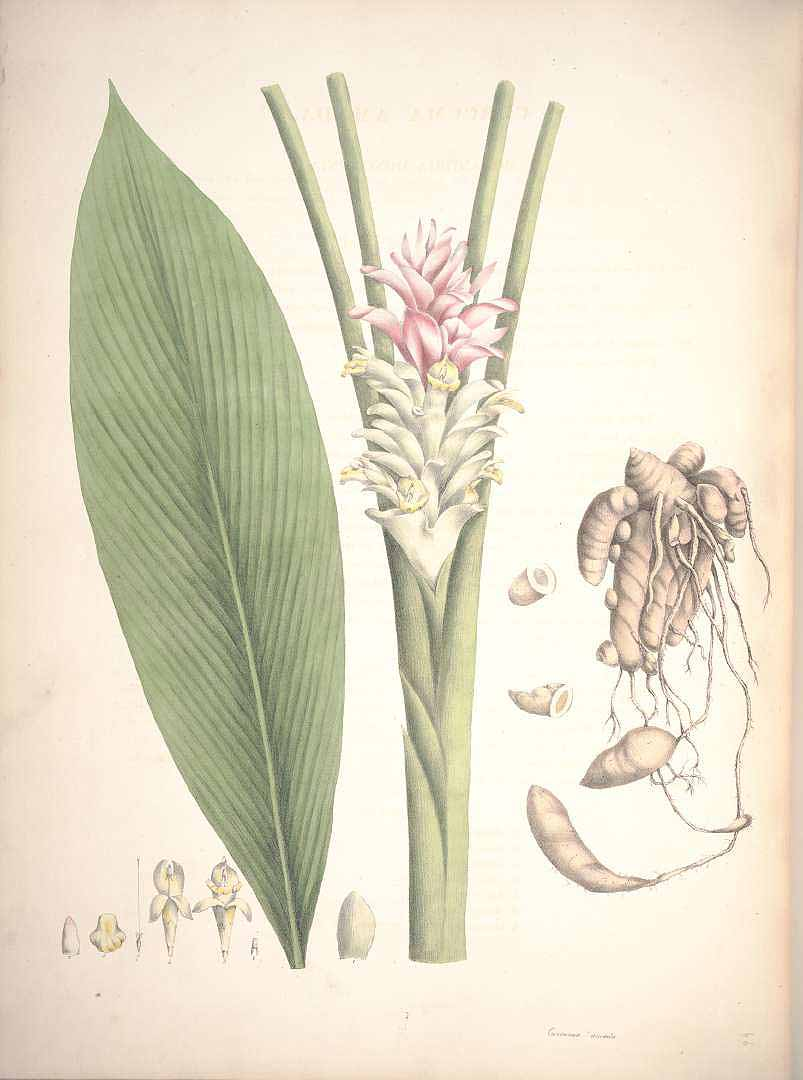

Scientific classification
- Kingdom: Plantae
- Clade: Tracheophytes
- Clade: Angiosperms
- Clade: Monocots
- Clade: Commelinids
- Order: Zingiberales
- Family: Zingiberaceae
- Genus: Curcuma
- Species: C. amada

Binomial name
- Curcuma amada Roxburgh

Synonyms
- Curcuma mangga Valeton & van Zijp

= Curcuma amada =

Mango ginger

Species of flowering plant

Curcuma amada, or mango ginger, is a plant of the ginger family Zingiberaceae and is closely related to turmeric (Curcuma longa). The rhizomes are very similar to common ginger but lack its pungency, and instead have a raw mango flavour.

== Taxonomy ==
The taxonomy of the species is a subject of some confusion, as some authorities have considered the name Curcuma mangga as identical, while others describe it as a distinct species, with C. mangga being found in southern India, while C. amada is of east Indian origin.

== Uses ==
Mango-ginger is popular as a spice and vegetable for its rich flavor, which is described as sweet with subtle earthy floral and pepper overtones and similar to that of raw mango. It is used as an addition to salads and stir fries, in South Asian and Southeast Asian as well as Far East Asian cuisines.

Mango ginger is used in making pickles in south India and chutneys in north India. It is served as chutney in community feasts in Nepal's southern plains. Mango ginger and elephant foot yam pickle is popular in Nepal's southern plains.

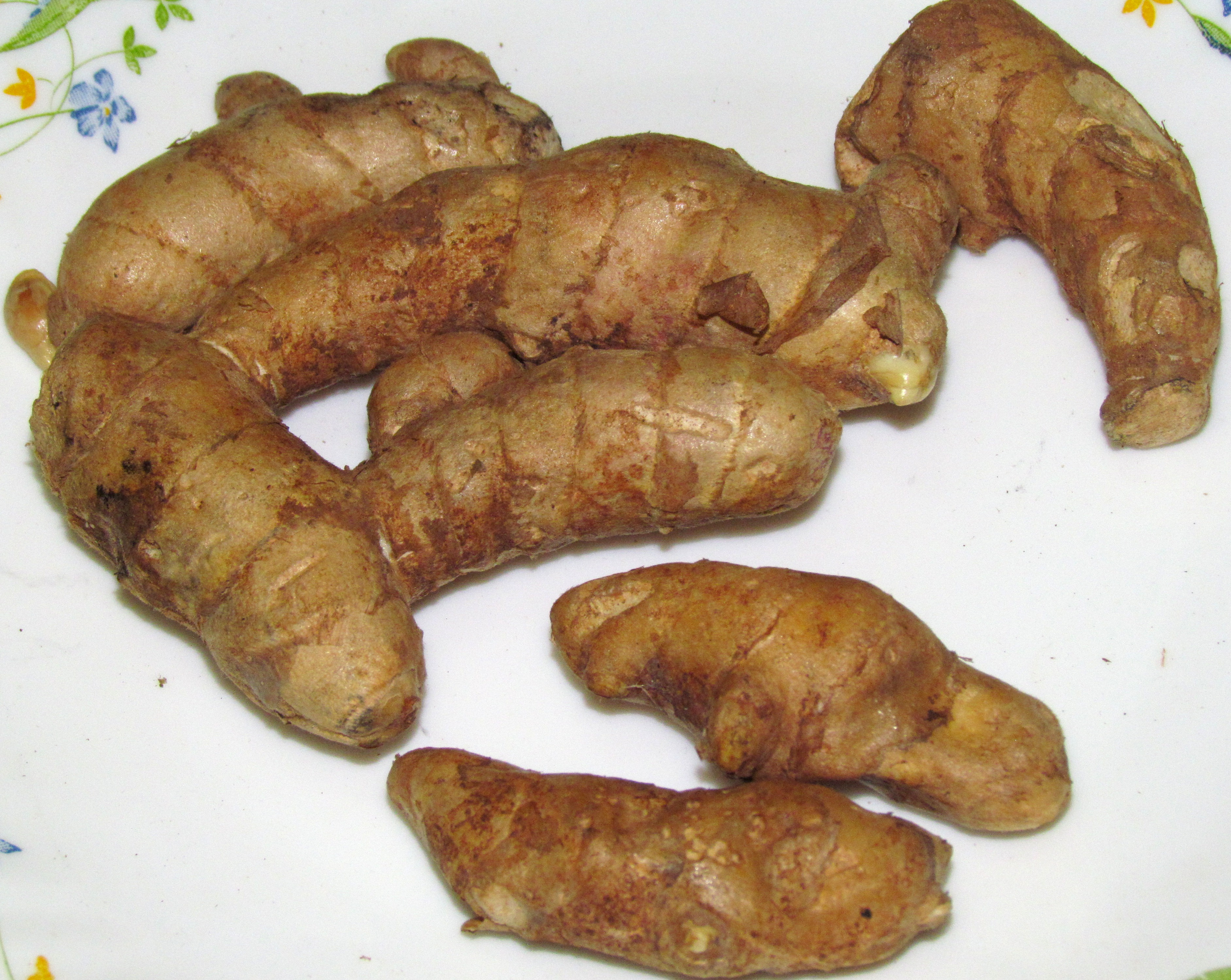
Roots of Curcuma amada

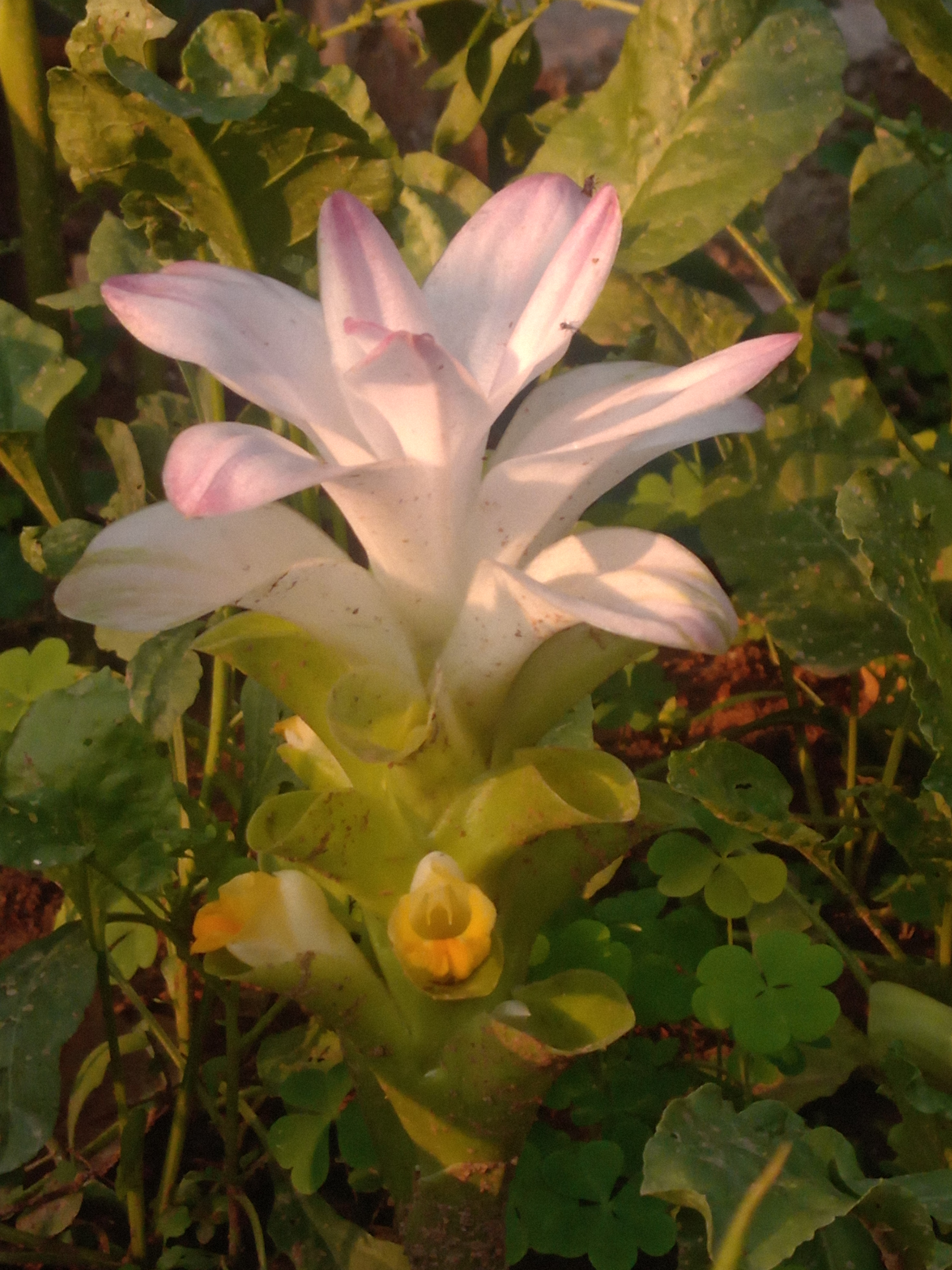
Flower of Curcuma amada
