= Curcuma rhomba =

Scientific classification
- Kingdom: Plantae
- Clade: Tracheophytes
- Clade: Angiosperms
- Clade: Monocots
- Clade: Commelinids
- Order: Zingiberales
- Family: Zingiberaceae
- Genus: Curcuma
- Species: C. rhomba

Binomial name
- Curcuma rhomba Mood & K.Larsen

Species of flowering plant

Curcuma rhomba is a monocotyledonous plant species described by John Donald Mood and Kai Larsen. Curcuma rhomba is part of the genus Curcuma and the family Zingiberaceae.

== Range ==
Curcuma rhomba is found in Indo-China.
