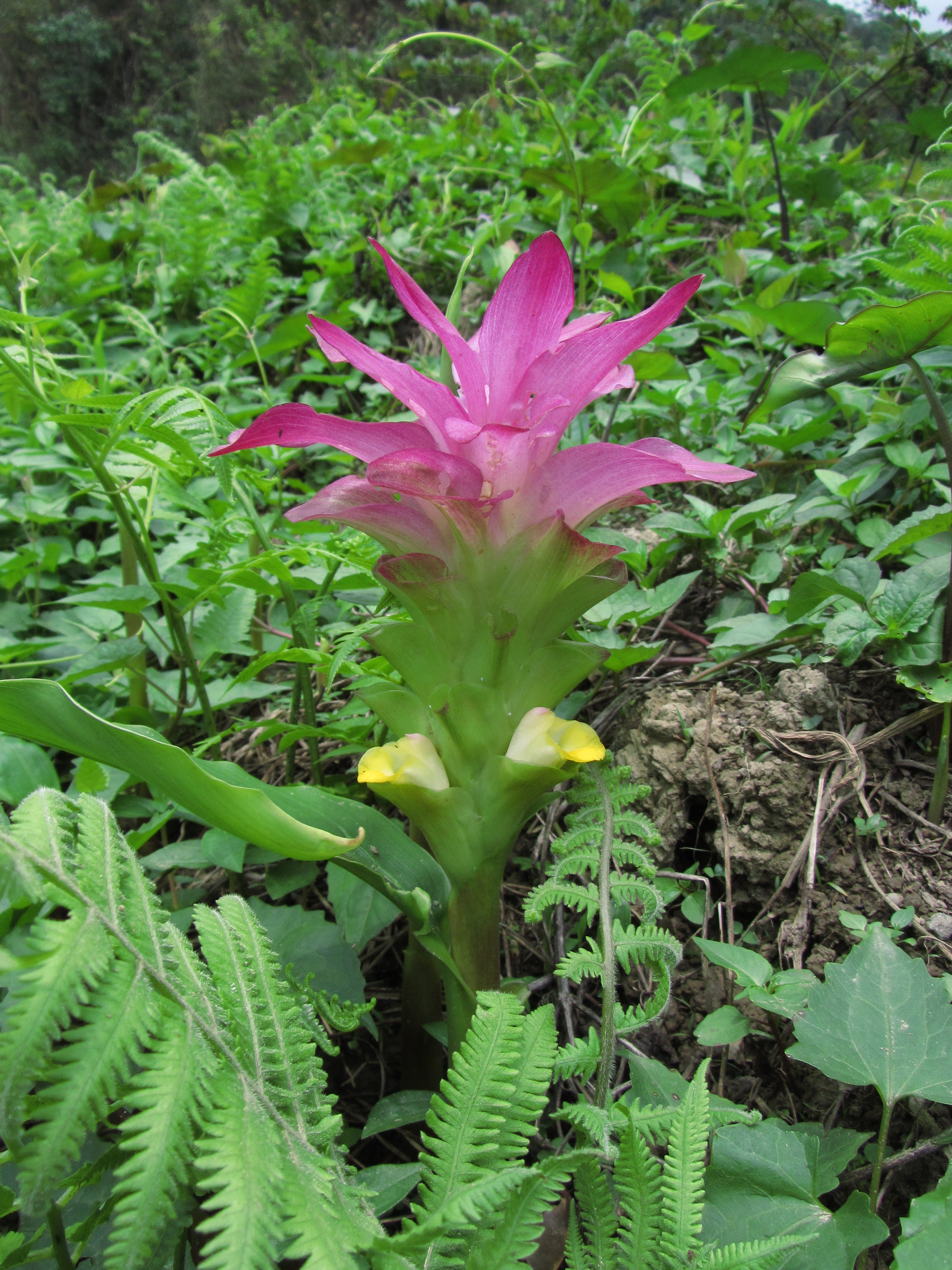

Scientific classification
- Kingdom: Plantae
- Clade: Embryophytes
- Clade: Tracheophytes
- Clade: Spermatophytes
- Clade: Angiosperms
- Clade: Monocots
- Clade: Commelinids
- Order: Zingiberales
- Family: Zingiberaceae
- Genus: Curcuma
- Species: C. aromatica

Binomial name
- Curcuma aromatica Salisb.

Synonyms
- Curcuma wenyujin Y.H.Chen & C.Ling; Curcuma zedoaria Roxb., sensu auct.

= Curcuma aromatica =

Species of flowering plant

Curcuma aromatica (common name: wild turmeric) is a member of the genus Curcuma belonging to the family Zingiberaceae. Botanically close to Curcuma australasica, wild turmeric has been widely used as a cosmetic herbal in South Asia and nearby regions. In Tamil and Malayalam, it is known as Kasthuri Manjal (கஸ்துரி மஞ்சள்/കസ്തൂരി മഞ്ഞൾ), and in Telugu, bontha-pasupu (బొంతపసుపు).

== Description ==
The perennial foliage dies down in late autumn and the rhizomes remain dormant in winter. The inflorescence appears in early spring from the base of the rhizomes. During summer monsoon season and the immediately following weeks, the plant grows fast and vigorously. The stalk grows to about 20–30 centimetres (7.9–11.8 in) tall, and is crowned with enlarged coloured bracts with pink tips. Leaves often appear even after the flowers. When in full growth the plants can reach a height of about 40 cm (16 in) tall.

== Habitat ==
This species is found in the south Asian region, predominantly in South India, Japan, and Sri Lanka. The chemical composition of the species grown in different areas were found to be in different quantities. It is commonly known to native to Western Ghats and has been used by South Asian communities.

== Uses ==
Wild turmeric has rhizomes with a peculiar fragrance and cream color. The rhizomes are often used as a culinary ingredient, and in traditional medicine, for skin disorders and as an antibacterial agent. It is also commonly used in ethnic cosmetic products. As a culinary ingredient it is used in limited quantities as a natural food colour. Leaves are broad and very decorative, elliptic with a leaf stem running as long to the tip of the blade. A fresh stalk with flowers and leaves, cut to proper size and shape, can be used as a floral indoor decoration in vase for up to 10 days.
