= Curcumin synthase =

Curcumin synthase 1 (CURS1)

Identifiers
- EC no.: 2.3.1.217
- CAS no.: 1245303-08-5

Databases
- IntEnz: IntEnz view
- BRENDA: BRENDA entry
- ExPASy: NiceZyme view
- KEGG: KEGG entry
- MetaCyc: metabolic pathway
- PRIAM: profile
- PDB structures: RCSB PDB PDBe PDBsum
- Gene Ontology: AmiGO / QuickGO
Search
- PMC: articles
- PubMed: articles
- NCBI: proteins

Curcumin synthase 3 (CURS3)

Identifiers
- EC no.: 2.3.1.219
- CAS no.: 1245303-10-9

Databases
- IntEnz: IntEnz view
- BRENDA: BRENDA entry
- ExPASy: NiceZyme view
- KEGG: KEGG entry
- MetaCyc: metabolic pathway
- PRIAM: profile
- PDB structures: RCSB PDB PDBe PDBsum
- Gene Ontology: AmiGO / QuickGO
Search
- PMC: articles
- PubMed: articles
- NCBI: proteins

Curcumin synthase categorizes three enzyme isoforms (CURS1, 2, and 3), type III polyketide synthases (PKSs) present in the leaves and rhizome of the turmeric plant (Curcuma longa) that synthesize curcumin. CURS1-3 are responsible for the hydrolysis of feruloyldiketide-CoA, previously produced in the curcuminoid pathway, and a decarboxylative condensation reaction that together comprise one of the final steps in the synthesis pathway for curcumin, demethoxycurcumin, and bisdemethoxycurcumin, the compounds that give turmeric both its distinctive yellow color, and traditional medical benefits. CURS should not be confused with Curcuminoid Synthase (CUS), which catalyzes the one-pot synthesis of bisdemethoxycurcumin in Oryza sativa.

== Structure ==
Crystallization studies have determined that curcumin synthase is a homodimer of ketosynthase subunits. Each includes a highly conserved Cys (164), His (303), Asn (336) catalytic triad, and CURS1 has been shown to exhibit the αβαβα folding pattern, conserved features of type III PKSs. The catalytic triads are independent of each other and are contained in the center of each monomer, connected to the surface with a CoA binding tunnel. While CURS1, 2, and 3 share approximately 80% amino acid sequence identity, their small structural differences account for their differences in preferred starter substrates and most prolific product.

The well conserved catalytic triad sits at the end of a hydrophobic cavity, referred to as the CoA binding tunnel, that allows for the specificity of curcumin synthase for the CoA moiety. The triad, displayed in a PyMOL image below, despite being buried in each monomer, is connected to the surface of the binding tunnel, allowing interactions with substrates. The pockets of the protein show this tunnel and where the β-keto acid tail of feruloyl-CoA can fit into, which we can also see in the photo of the CoA binding tunnel reaching towards the catalytic triad. In addition to the catalytic triad, there are two conserved phenylalanine residues, Phe-215 and Phe-265, and a glycine, Gly-211, that contribute to the nature of the hydrophobicity pocket. The phenylalanines are named the “gatekeepers,” which allow for the correct tunnel width for CoA. The Gyl-211 can be mutated to affect the trafficking of this pocket, as bulkier residues can occupy the hydrophobic cavity. CURS1 has not been crystallized with CoA, but chalcone synthase, which is another type III PKS, has been shown bound to CoA. CHS and curcumin synthase have the same catalytic triad and CoA binding tunnel, so we can look at the nature of binding. The CoA is held tightly in the CoA binding tunnel in the image of conserved residues, showing where it can connect to these gatekeepers and traffic guards of important residues.

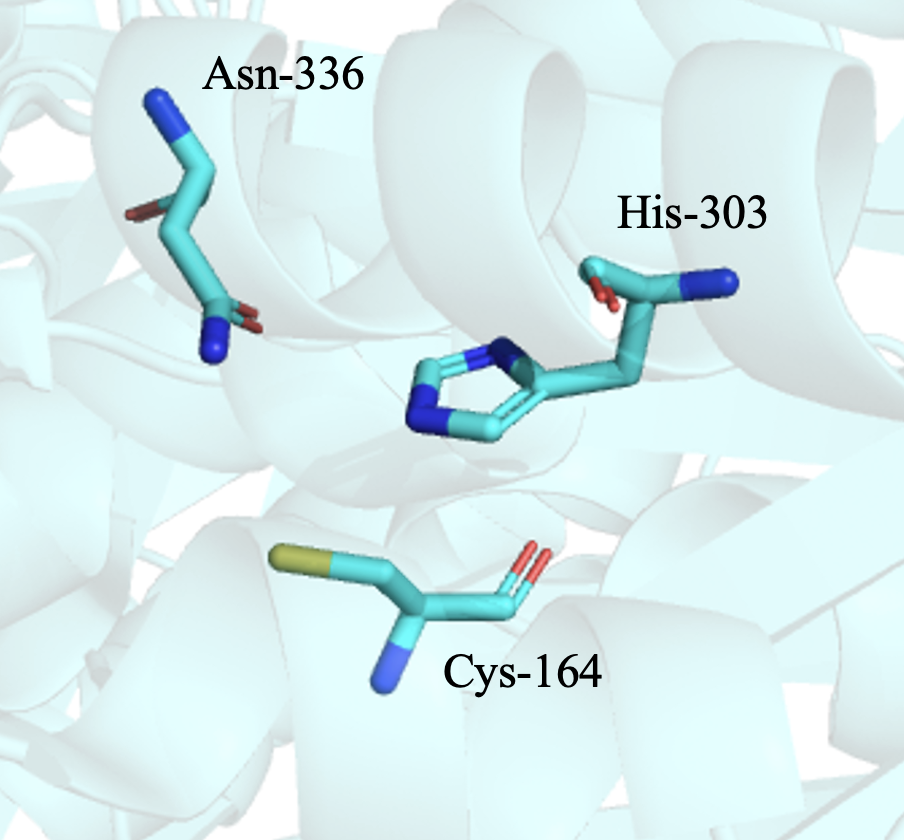
The Catalytic Triad of CURS1- Created in PyMol using PDB 3OV2, doi:10.1074/jbc.M110.196279

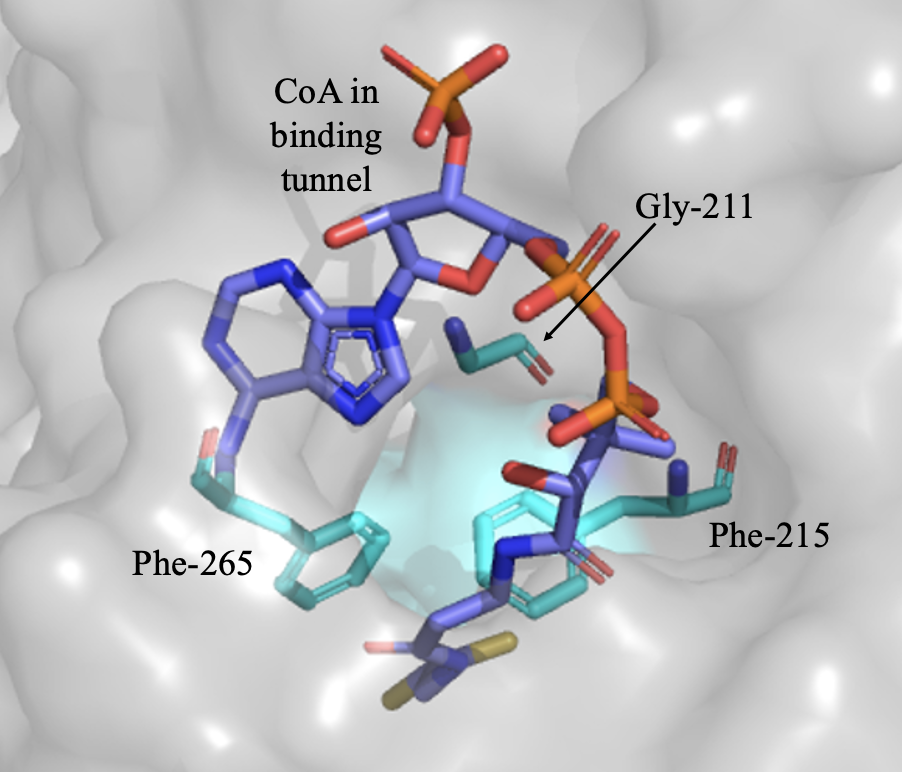
Conserved Residues with CoA Binding- Phe-215, Phe-265, and Gly-211 are shown surrounding the edges of the CoA binding tunnel. Curcumin synthase (PBD 3OV2) was aligned with chalcone synthase bound to CoA (PBD 1BQ6). CHS was hidden on PyMOL to reveal CoA binding with curcumin synthase.

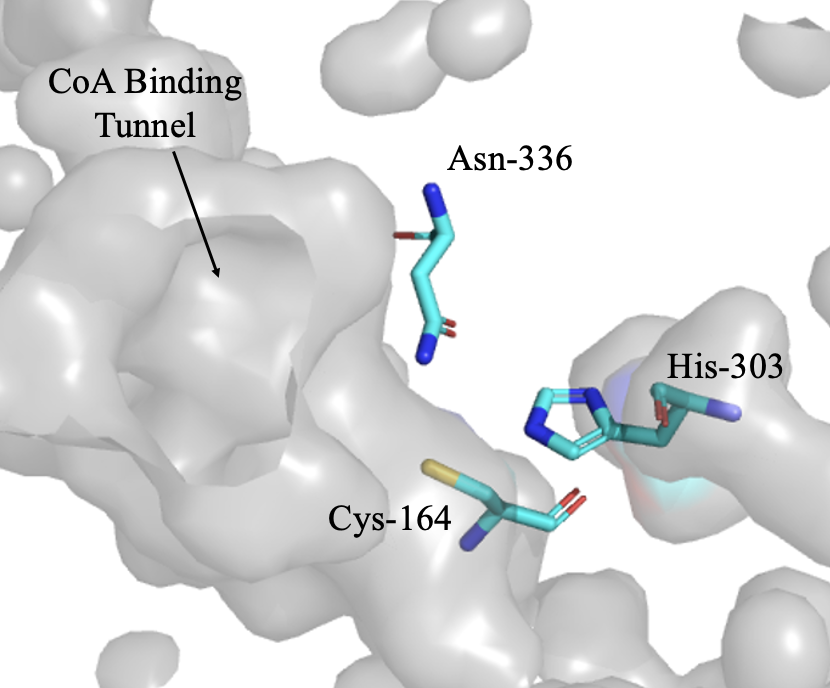
CoA Binding Tunnel- The catalytic triad (shown in red) is connected to the CoA binding tunnel. Cavities and pockets of CURS1 were shown to show where CoA can connect to the catalytic triad (PBD 3OV2).

== Mechanism ==
Each CURS catalyzes the reactions necessary to convert a feruloyldiketide-CoA into a curcuminoid, but the three isoforms have preferred starter substrates and products. CURS1 converts feruloyldiketide-CoA esters into curcumin using feruloyl-CoA exclusively as a starter substrate. CURS2 produces both curcumin and demethoxycurcumin, favoring feruloyl-CoA as a starter, and CURS3 produces curcumin, demethoxycurcumin, and bisdemethoxycurcumin from either feruloyl-CoA or 4-coumaroyl-CoA as the starter substrate. The fact that preferences of starter substrates vary between the three CURS is corroborated by carbon labeling studies confirming the incorporation of a variety of starter substrates into curcuminoid products in C. longa.

Only the mechanism of CURS1 has been elucidated. In the first step, the feruloyl moiety of feruloyl-CoA is transferred to Cys (164) followed by feruloyldiketide-CoA entering the CoA binding tunnel and being hydrolyzed through an unknown mechanism to a β-keto acid. The acid is then used as an extender substrate in the catalytic triad, where it undergoes decarboxylative condensation with the feruloyl moiety on Cys (164). This mechanism is thought to be identical to that of the decarboxylative condensation of malonyl-CoA in other type III PKSs. The hydrolysis of the diketide has been shown to be the rate-limiting step of the enzyme.

It was previously hypothesized that the curcumoid pathway employed two cinnamoyl-CoAs and one malonyl-CoA, but this was suggested against by the absence of a necessary intermediate such a pathway (bisdeshydroxybisdesmethoxycurcumin), strengthening evidence for feruloyl-CoA or 4-coumaroyl-CoA as starter substrate in CURS.

== Biological activity ==
The production of curcumin and its derivatives by CURS may be a defense mechanism of C. longa against internal and external threats. Curcumin is a potent antioxidant, as its phenolic structure, highest in activity in curcumin rather than its demethoxylated derivatives, acts as a free-radical scavenging apparatus, eliminating free superoxides and DPPH from the plant's cells. Curcumin synthase may also protect Curcuma longa from herbivores to some degree, as curcumin has a distinctively bitter taste: studies show CURS1, 2 have higher expression in the leaves of C. longa than the rhizome while CURS3 shows equal expression in both locations.

== Role in cancer research ==
Research suggests that curcumin is an active anti-cancer molecule against cancers of brain, breast, bones, blood, gastrointestinal tract, genitourinary tract, as well as thoracic and gynecological cancers. The molecule achieves this wide-range activity by up or down-regulating numerous receptors, kinases, growth factors, transcriptional factors, and inflammatory cytokines, among others, thus its biosynthesis is of great interest to medicine.

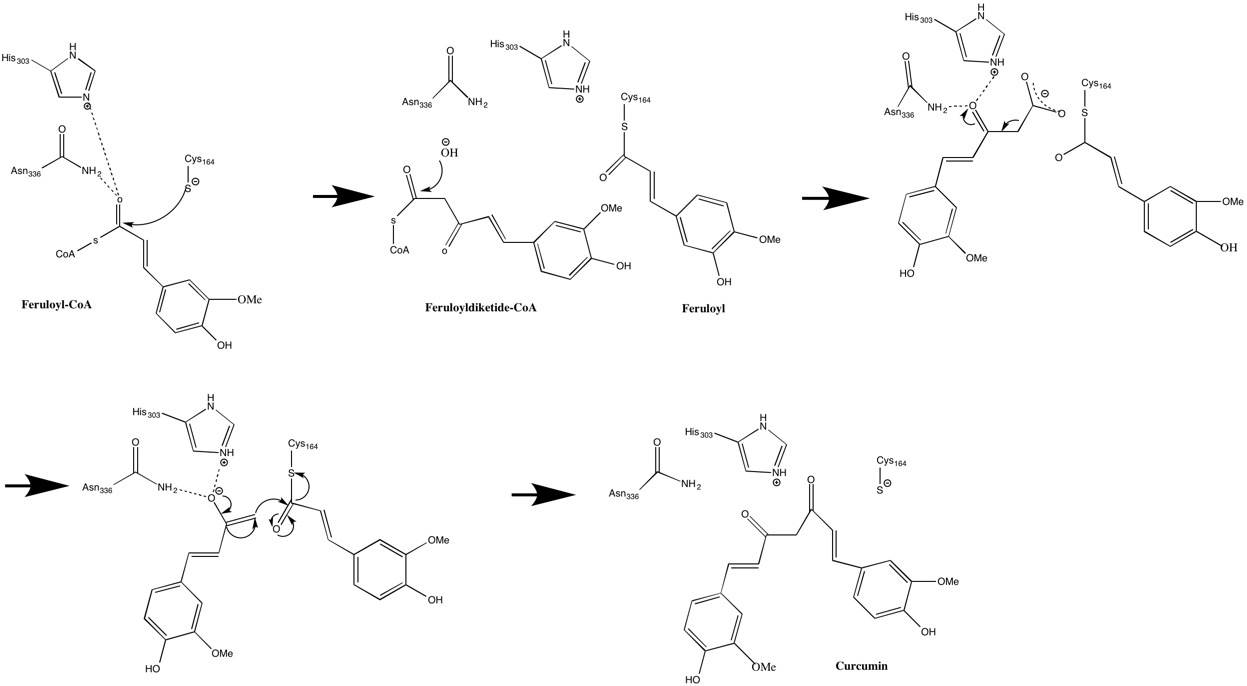
The Proposed Mechanism of CURS1-Original work using ChemBioDraw. Based upon the mechanism elucidated in doi:10.1074/jbc.M110.196279

For instance, curcumin inhibits mammalian nuclear factor κB (NF-κB) by preventing its translocation to the nucleus. This inhibitory action upregulates the levels of preapoptotic and apoptotic cells, eliminating damaged cells, and discouraging abnormal growth patterns, as well as decreasing chemokine levels. As activated NF-κB is associated with oxidative stress, inhibition of the nuclear factor by curcumin is consistent with the chemical's role as an antioxidant. A homologous system to NF-κB signaling exists in plants, evidence that curcumin may play a similar role in C. longa as it does in humans.

Curcumin syntheses in C. longa have been until recently, the only readily available synthesis method of curcumin. Today, laboratory syntheses are capable of producing the chemical, and numerous teams are constructing curcumin analogues designed to target specific biological processes, such as the NFκB signaling pathway previously discussed.
