= C19H16O4 =

The molecular formula C_{19}H_{16}O_{4} (molar mass: 308.33 g/mol, exact mass: 308.1049 u) may refer to:

- Bisdemethoxycurcumin
- Warfarin
