= EF-24 =

Chemical compound

Identifiers
- IUPAC name: (3E,5E)-3,5-bis[(2-fluorophenyl)methylidene]piperidin-4-one
- CAS Number: 342808-40-6
- PubChem CID: 9885748
- ChemSpider: 8061422
- UNII: O5YT36MST0
- ChEMBL: ChEMBL379849

Chemical and physical data
- Formula: C_{19}H_{15}F_{2}NO
- Molar mass: 311.332 g·mol^{−1}
- 3D model (JSmol): Interactive image
- SMILES: C\1NC/C(=C\C2=CC=CC=C2F)/C(=O)/C1=C/C3=CC=CC=C3F
- InChI: InChI=1S/C19H15F2NO/c20-17-7-3-1-5-13(17)9-15-11-22-12-16(19(15)23)10-14-6-2-4-8-18(14)21/h1-10,22H,11-12H2/b15-9+,16-10+; Key:NIVYQYSNRUIFIF-KAVGSWPWSA-N

EF-24 is a compound that is a synthetic analogue of curcumin, a bioactive phytochemical from turmeric. Curcumin has antioxidant, antibiotic, anti-inflammatory and anti-cancer properties in vitro but has low potency and very poor bioavailability when taken orally, resulting in limited efficacy. EF-24 was developed to try to improve upon these properties, and has been found to be around 10 times more potent than curcumin and with much higher systemic bioavailability. It has never been developed for medical use, though research continues to investigate whether it may be useful as an adjuvant treatment for some cancers alongside conventional chemotherapy drugs.
