= Curcuminoid =

Class of chemical compounds

Curcumin

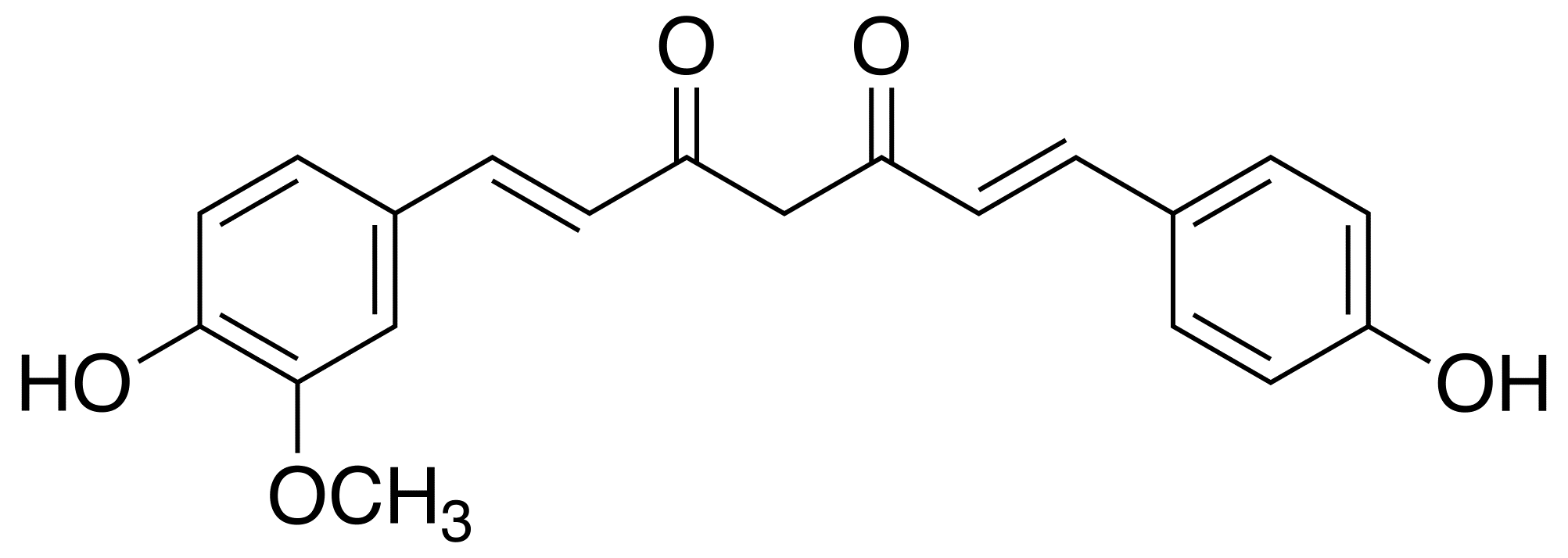
Demethoxycurcumin

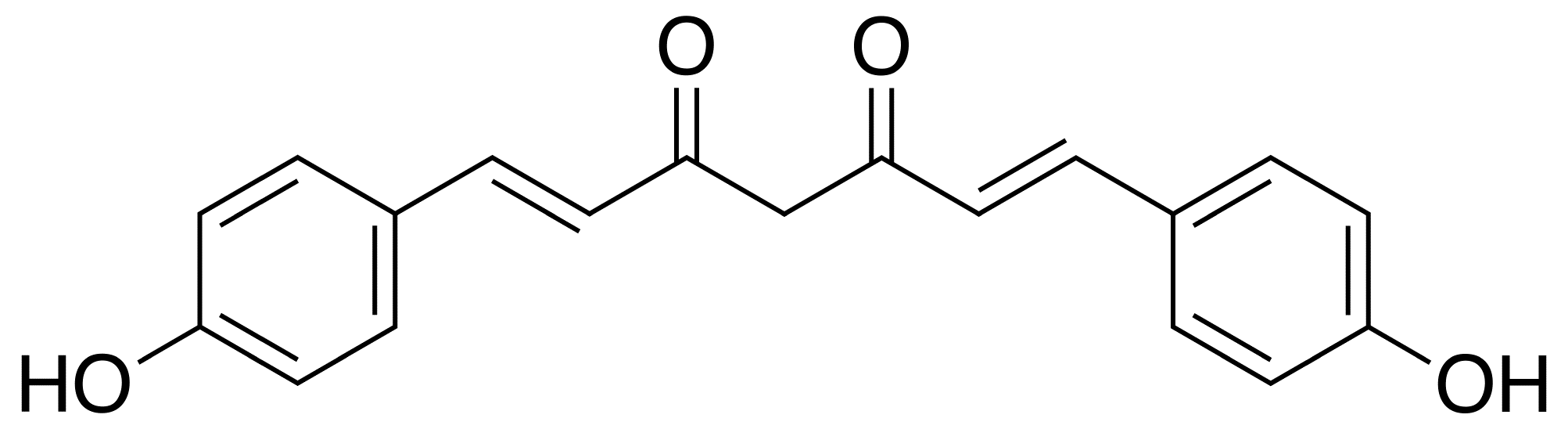
Bisdemethoxycurcumin

A curcuminoid is a linear diarylheptanoid, a relatively small class of plant secondary metabolites that includes curcumin, demethoxycurcumin, and bisdemethoxycurcumin, all isolated from turmeric (curcuma longa). These compounds are natural phenols and produce a pronounced yellow color that is often used to color foods and medicines. Curcumin is obtained from the root of turmeric.

Curcuminoids are soluble in dimethyl sulfoxide (DMSO), acetone and ethanol, but are poorly soluble in lipids. It is possible to increase curcuminoid solubility in aqueous phase with surfactants or co-surfactants. Most common derivatives have different substituents on the phenyl groups. There is an increasing demand for demethoxycurcumin, bisdemethoxycurcumin, and other curcuminoids because of their biological activity.

== Cyclodextrins ==
Curcuminoids form a more stable complex with solutions which contain cyclodextrin towards hydrolytic degradations. The stability differs between size and characterization of the cyclodextrins that are used. Dissolution of demethoxycurcumin, bisdemethoxycurcumin and curcumin are greatest in the hydroxypropyl-γ-cyclodextrin (HPγCD) cavity. The curcuminoids which have a substituent connected to the phenyl groups show more affinity for the HPγCD compound. Degradation rate is depended on pH of the solution and how much protection the cyclodextrins provide the curcuminoids. The derivatives are usually more stable than curcumin against hydrolysis in cyclodextrin solution. No covalent bonds are present between the cyclodextrins and the curcuminoids so they are easily released from the complex by simple solvent effects.

== Composition and production ==
The curcumin derivatives demethoxycurcumin and bisdemethoxycurcumin may have antioxidant activities useful in maintaining shelf-life of food products. Pure chemicals of curcumin and its derivatives are not available in the open market. Commercially available curcumin contains 77% curcumin, 17% demethoxycurcumin and 3% bisdemethoxycurcumin from the herb Curcuma longa.

Curcumin is mainly produced in industry as a pigment by using turmeric oleoresin as the starting material which curcuminoids can be isolated from. After the isolation of the curcuminoids, the extract which is about 75% liquor mainly contains oil, resin and more curcuminoids which can be isolated further.

== Research ==
Laboratory and clinical studies have not confirmed any medical use for curcumin, which is difficult to study because it is both unstable and poorly bioavailable, and is unlikely to produce useful lead compounds for drug development. Curcumin, which shows positive results in most drug discovery assays, is regarded as a false lead that medicinal chemists include among "pan-assay interference compounds". This attracts undue experimental attention while failing to advance as viable therapeutic or drug leads.
