= Desmethoxycurcumin =

Names
- Preferred IUPAC name (1E,6E)-1-(4-Hydroxy-3-methoxyphenyl)-7-(4-hydroxyphenyl)hepta-1,6-diene-3,5-dione
- Other names Curcumin II; Desmethoxycurcumin; Monodemethoxycurcumin

Identifiers
CAS Number	22608-11-3
3D model (JSmol)	Interactive image
ChemSpider	39463964
ECHA InfoCard	100.189.739
PubChem CID	5469424
UNII	W2F8059T80
CompTox Dashboard (EPA)	DTXSID00873751
- InChI: InChI=1S/C20H18O5/c1-25-20-12-15(6-11-19(20)24)5-10-18(23)13-17(22)9-4-14-2-7-16(21)8-3-14/h2-12,21,24H,13H2,1H3/b9-4+,10-5+ Key: HJTVQHVGMGKONQ-LUZURFALSA-N
- SMILES: COc(c1)c(O)ccc(C=CC(=O)CC(=O)C=Cc(c2)ccc(O)c2)1

Properties
Chemical formula	C_{20}H_{18}O_{5}
Molar mass	338.359 g·mol^{−1}
- Except where otherwise noted, data are given for materials in their standard state (at 25 °C [77 °F], 100 kPa). Infobox references

Desmethoxycurcumin is a curcuminoid found in turmeric. Commercial grade curcumin contains a mixture of curcuminoids (desmethoxycurcumin 10–20%, bisdesmethoxycurcumin 5% or less).

== See also ==
- Bis-desmethoxycurcumin
- Curcumin
