= Bisdemethoxycurcumin =

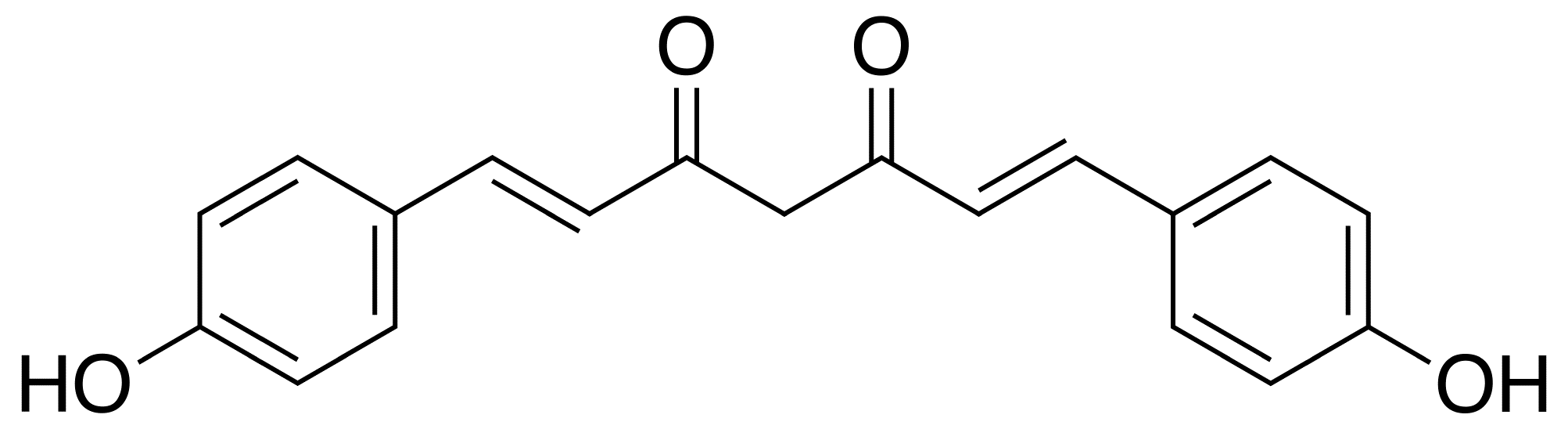

Names
- Preferred IUPAC name (1E,6E)-1,7-Bis(4-hydroxyphenyl)hepta-1,6-diene-3,5-dione
- Other names Curcumin III, bis(4-hydroxycinnamoyl)methane, didemethoxycurcumin, bisdemethoxycurcumin, Bis(p-hydroxycinnamoyl)methane, NSC687839

Identifiers
CAS Number	24939-16-0
3D model (JSmol)	Interactive image
ChemSpider	4474770
PubChem CID	5315472
CompTox Dashboard (EPA)	DTXSID00872663
- InChI: InChI=1S/C19H16O4/c20-16-7-1-14(2-8-16)5-11-18(22)13-19(23)12-6-15-3-9-17(21)10-4-15/h1-12,20-21H,13H2/b11-5+,12-6+ Key: PREBVFJICNPEKM-YDWXAUTNSA-N
- SMILES: C1=CC(=CC=C1C=CC(=O)CC(=O)C=CC2=CC=C(C=C2)O)O

Properties
Chemical formula	C_{19}H_{16}O_{4}
Molar mass	308.333 g·mol^{−1}
Density	1.285 g/cm^{3}
Melting point	226 to 231 °C (439 to 448 °F; 499 to 504 K)
- Except where otherwise noted, data are given for materials in their standard state (at 25 °C [77 °F], 100 kPa). Infobox references

Bisdemethoxycurcumin is a curcuminoid found (along with the curcuminoids curcumin and demethoxycurcumin) in turmeric (Curcuma longa), but absent in Javanese turmeric (Curcuma xanthorrhiza). Bisdemethoxycurcumin is used as a pigment and nutraceutical with antimutagenic properties. All three of the curcuminoids found in Curcuma longa have been shown to have antioxidant properties, but bisdemethoxycurcumin is more resistant than the others to alkaline degradation. It was found to be effective in sensitizing PC cells resistance against gemcitabine.

== See also ==
- Curcumin
- Desmethoxycurcumin
