= Myricanone =

Identifiers
CAS Number	32492-74-3
3D model (JSmol)	Interactive image
ChEBI	CHEBI:141540
ChemSpider	142062
PubChem CID	161748
CompTox Dashboard (EPA)	DTXSID60186218
- InChI: InChI=1S/C21H24O5/c1-25-20-17-12-14(19(24)21(20)26-2)5-3-4-6-15(22)9-7-13-8-10-18(23)16(17)11-13/h8,10-12,23-24H,3-7,9H2,1-2H3 Key: ZTSNTUQTNQSIDC-UHFFFAOYSA-N; InChI=1/C21H24O5/c1-25-20-17-12-14(19(24)21(20)26-2)5-3-4-6-15(22)9-7-13-8-10-18(23)16(17)11-13/h8,10-12,23-24H,3-7,9H2,1-2H3 Key: ZTSNTUQTNQSIDC-UHFFFAOYAU
- SMILES: COC1=C(C(=C2CCCCC(=O)CCC3=CC(=C(C=C3)O)C1=C2)O)OC

Properties
Chemical formula	C_{21}H_{24}O_{5}
Molar mass	356.41 g/mol
- Except where otherwise noted, data are given for materials in their standard state (at 25 °C [77 °F], 100 kPa). Infobox references

Myricanone is a cyclic diarylheptanoid isolated from the bark of Myrica rubra (Myricaceae).
