= Turmerone =

Turmerones are a group of related chemical compounds of the sesquiterpene class. They are found in turmeric (Curcuma longa), from which they derive their name, as well as other related plants such as Curcuma caesia. There are multiple structural types of turmerones which differ in the number and placement of double bonds including α-tumerone, β-turmerone (also known as curlone), and ar-turmerone. Each of these types consists of multiple stereoisomers.

A number of in vitro biological activities of turmerones have been reported, including antiinflammatory, immunomodulatory, antiproliferative, and antifungal activities.

== Example chemical structures ==
α-turmerone	β-turmerone	ar-turmerone	(S)-turmerone
(S)-α-turmerone	(+)-β-turmerone	(S)-ar-turmerone	
