= Diarylheptanoid =

Class of chemicals found in plants

Curcumin, a linear diarylheptanoid

The diarylheptanoids (also known as diphenylheptanoids) are a class of plant secondary metabolites. Diarylheptanoids consist of two aromatic rings (aryl groups) joined by a seven carbons chain (heptane) and having various substituents. They can be classified into linear (curcuminoids) and cyclic diarylheptanoids. The best known member is curcumin, which is isolated from turmeric (Curcuma longa) and is known as food coloring E100. Some other Curcuma species, such as Curcuma comosa also produce diarylheptanoids.

They have been reported from plants in 10 different families, e.g. Betulaceae and Zingiberaceae.

A diarylheptanoid is an intermediate in the biosynthesis of phenylphenalenones in Anigozanthos preissii or Wachendorfia thyrsiflora (Haemodoraceae).

== Cyclic diarylheptanoids ==
Myricanone, a cyclic diarylheptanoid

Cyclic diarylheptanoids formed from myricanone can be isolated from the bark of Myrica rubra (Myricaceae). Two cyclic diarylheptanoids, named ostryopsitrienol and ostryopsitriol, can be isolated from the stems of endemic Chinese medicinal plant Ostryopsis nobilis (Betulaceae). Acerogenin M can be found in Acer nikoense (Sapindaceae). Jugcathayenoside and (+)-galeon can be found in the root bark of Juglans cathayensis (Juglandaceae).

== Health effects ==
The antioxidant activity of diarylheptanoids isolated from rhizomes of Etlingera elatior (Zingiberaceae) is greater than that of α-tocopherol.
