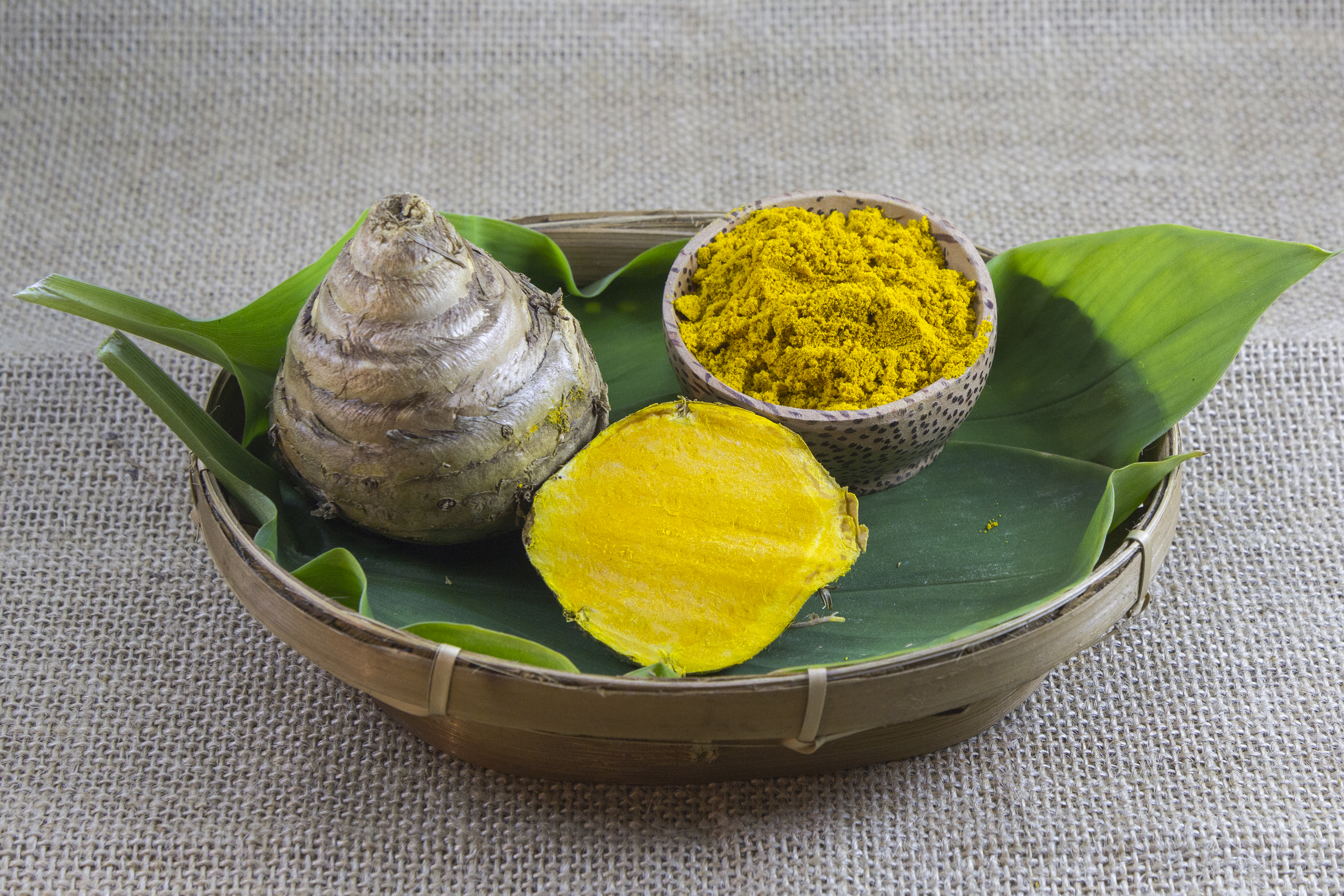

Scientific classification
- Kingdom: Plantae
- Clade: Tracheophytes
- Clade: Angiosperms
- Clade: Monocots
- Clade: Commelinids
- Order: Zingiberales
- Family: Zingiberaceae
- Genus: Curcuma
- Species: C. zanthorrhiza

Binomial name
- Curcuma zanthorrhiza Roxb.

Synonyms
- Curcuma xanthorrhiza Roxb. orth. var.

= Curcuma zanthorrhiza =

Species of flowering plant

Curcuma zanthorrhiza, known as temulawak, Java ginger, Javanese ginger, or Javanese turmeric is a plant species, belonging to the ginger family. It is known in Javanese as temulawak, in Sundanese as koneng gede (large turmeric) and in Madurese as temu labak. The scientific name is sometimes written as Curcuma xanthorrhiza, but this is an orthographical variant.

This plant originated from Indonesia, more specifically from Java island, out of which it spread to several places in the biogeographical region Malesia. Currently, most of the temu lawak is cultivated in Indonesia, Malaysia, Thailand, and the Philippines. Outside of South East Asia, cultivars may be found also in China, Indochina, Barbados, India, Japan, Korea, the United States and some countries in Europe.

Curcuma xanthorrhiza flourishes up to 1500 m above sea level in a tropical climate. Its rhizomes develop well in loose soil.

== Uses ==
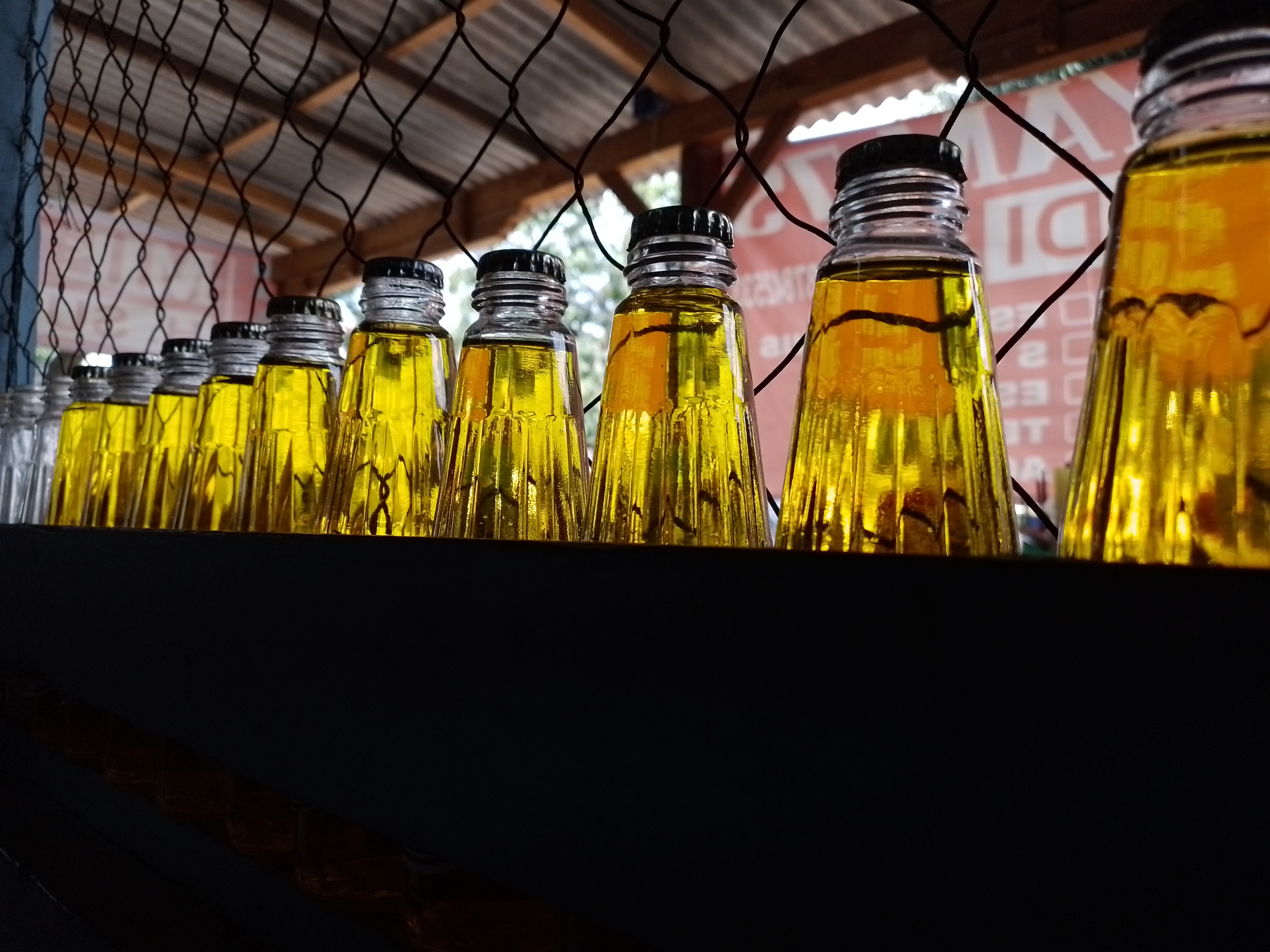
Sari temulawak drink

Curcuma xanthorrhiza is used as a medicinal plant. The rhizome contains an ethereal oil (5ml per kg), it primarily consists of Sesquiterpenes. There is also a content of Curcumin (at least 1%, Ph. Eur.) and starch. Curcuma xanthorrhiza is used for dyspepsia. It is a spice too. According to one source it is an effective deterrent and pesticide of mushroom mites. In Java, there is a drink made from the juice of Curcuma zanthorrhiza called sari temulawak.
