= Pan-assay interference compounds =

Types of chemical compounds

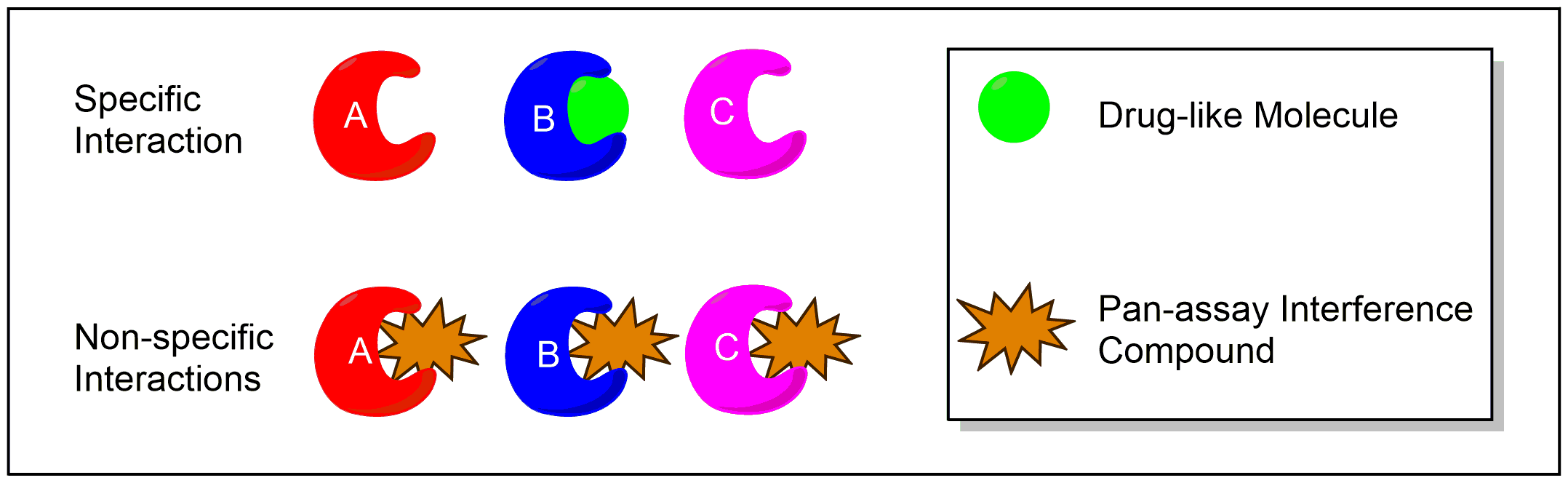
Diagram depicting a representative pan-assay interference compound. The drug-like molecule specifically interacts with target B, but the PAINS-like compound non-specifically interacts with multiple targets

Pan-assay interference compounds (PAINS) are chemical compounds that often give false positive results in high-throughput screens. PAINS tend to react nonspecifically with numerous biological targets rather than specifically affecting one desired target. A number of disruptive functional groups are shared by many PAINS.

While a number of filters have been proposed and are used in virtual screening and computer-aided drug design, the accuracy of filters with regard to compounds they flag and don't flag has been criticized.

Common PAINS include toxoflavin, isothiazolones, hydroxyphenyl hydrazones, curcumin, phenol-sulfonamides, rhodanines, enones, quinones, and catechols such as luteolin, baicalin and scutellarin.

== See also ==
- Drug discovery
