= Curcumin =

Principal curcuminoid of turmeric

- Enol form

- Keto form

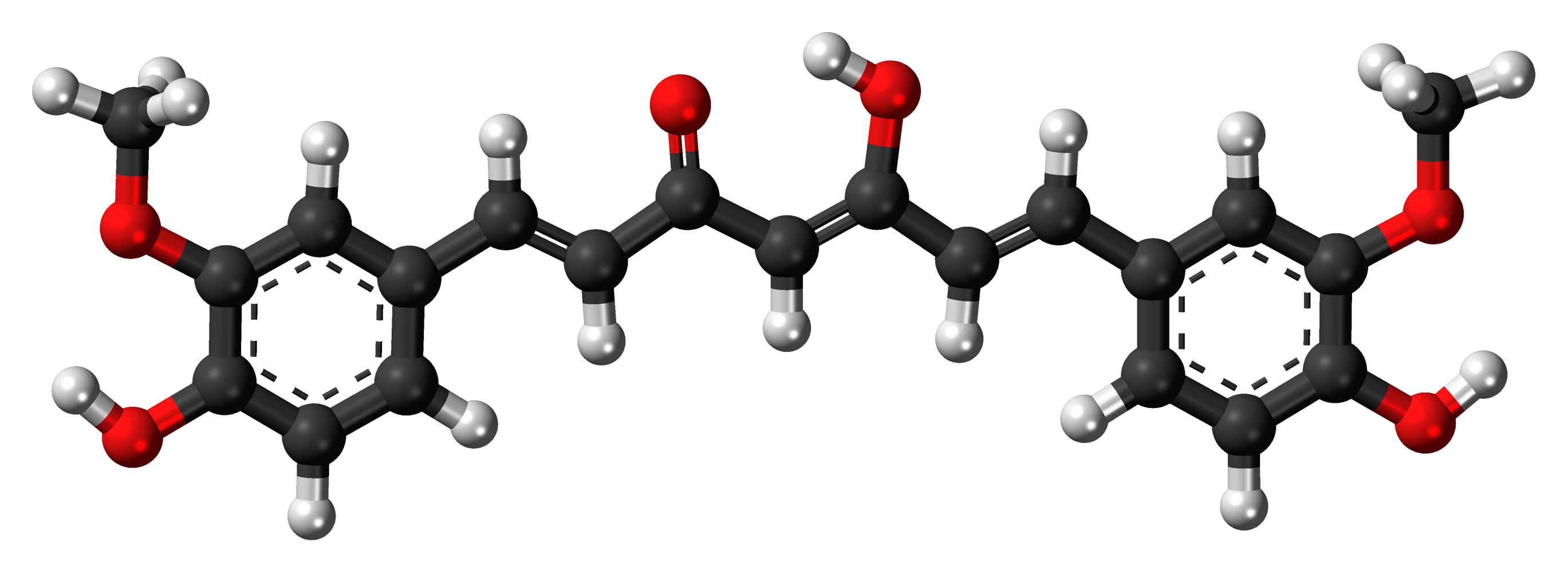

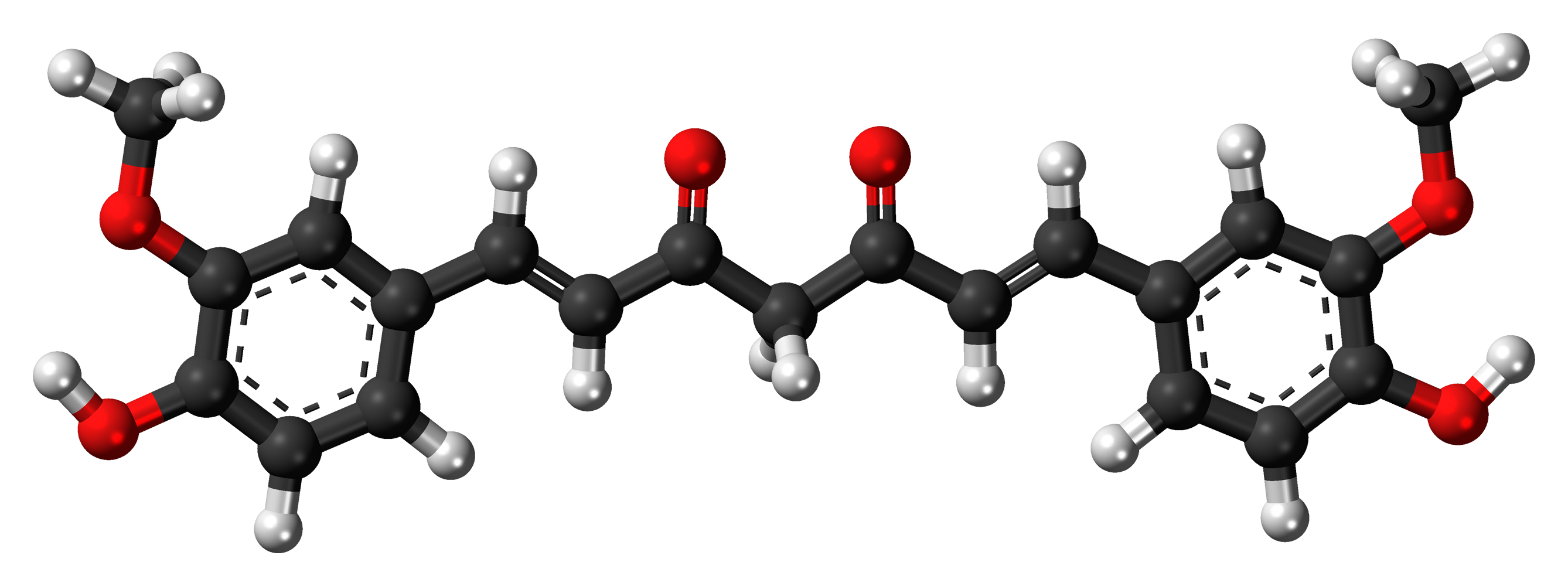

Names
Pronunciation	/ˈkɜːrkjʊmɪn/
- Preferred IUPAC name (1E,6E)-1,7-Bis(4-hydroxy-3-methoxyphenyl)hepta-1,6-diene-3,5-dione
- Other names: (1E,6E)-1,7-Bis(4-hydroxy-3-methoxyphenyl)-1,6-heptadiene-3,5-dione; Diferuloylmethane; Curcumin I; C.I. 75300; Natural Yellow 3

Identifiers
CAS Number	458-37-7
3D model (JSmol)	Interactive image
ChEBI	CHEBI:3962
ChEMBL	ChEMBL116438
ChemSpider	839564
ECHA InfoCard	100.006.619
E number	E100 (colours)
IUPHAR/BPS	7000
KEGG	C10443
PubChem CID	969516
UNII	IT942ZTH98
CompTox Dashboard (EPA)	DTXSID8031077
- InChI: InChI=1S/C21H20O6/c1-26-20-11-14(5-9-18(20)24)3-7-16(22)13-17(23)8-4-15-6-10-19(25)21(12-15)27-2/h3-12,24-25H,13H2,1-2H3/b7-3+,8-4+ Key: VFLDPWHFBUODDF-FCXRPNKRSA-N; InChI=1/C21H20O6/c1-26-20-11-14(5-9-18(20)24)3-7-16(22)13-17(23)8-4-15-6-10-19(25)21(12-15)27-2/h3-12,24-25H,13H2,1-2H3/b7-3+,8-4+ Key: VFLDPWHFBUODDF-FCXRPNKRBF
- SMILES: O=C(\C=C\c1ccc(O)c(OC)c1)CC(=O)\C=C\c2cc(OC)c(O)cc2

Properties
Chemical formula	C_{21}H_{20}O_{6}
Molar mass	368.385 g·mol^{−1}
Appearance	Bright yellow-orange powder
Melting point	183 °C (361 °F; 456 K)
- Except where otherwise noted, data are given for materials in their standard state (at 25 °C [77 °F], 100 kPa). verify (what is ?) Infobox references

Curcumin is a bright yellow chemical produced by the plant species Curcuma longa. It is the principal curcuminoid of turmeric (Curcuma longa), a member of the ginger family, Zingiberaceae. It is sold as an herbal supplement, cosmetics ingredient, food flavoring, and food coloring.

Chemically, curcumin is a polyphenol, more particularly a diarylheptanoid, belonging to the group of curcuminoids, which are phenolic pigments responsible for the yellow color of turmeric.

Extensive studies have consistently failed to show any medical value for curcumin. It is difficult to study because it is both unstable and poorly bioavailable. It is unlikely to produce useful leads for drug development as a lead compound.

== History ==
Curcumin was named in 1815 when Henri Auguste Vogel and Pierre Joseph Pelletier reported the first isolation of a "yellow coloring-matter" from the rhizomes of turmeric. Later, it was found to be a mixture of resin and turmeric oil. In 1910, Milobedzka and Lampe reported the chemical structure of curcumin to be as diferuloylmethane. Later in 1913, the same group accomplished the synthesis of the compound.

Although used in traditional medicine, the possible therapeutic properties of turmeric or curcumin remain undetermined.

== Uses ==
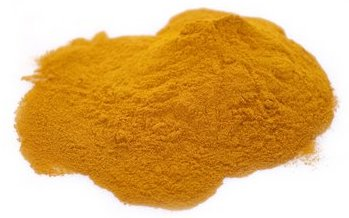
Curcumin powder

The most common applications are as an ingredient in dietary supplement, in cosmetics, as flavoring for foods, such as turmeric-flavored beverages in South and Southeast Asia, and as coloring for foods, such as curry powders, mustards, butters, and cheeses. As a food additive for orange-yellow coloring in prepared foods, its E number is E 100 in the European Union. It is also approved by the U.S. FDA to be used as a food coloring in US.

== Chemistry ==
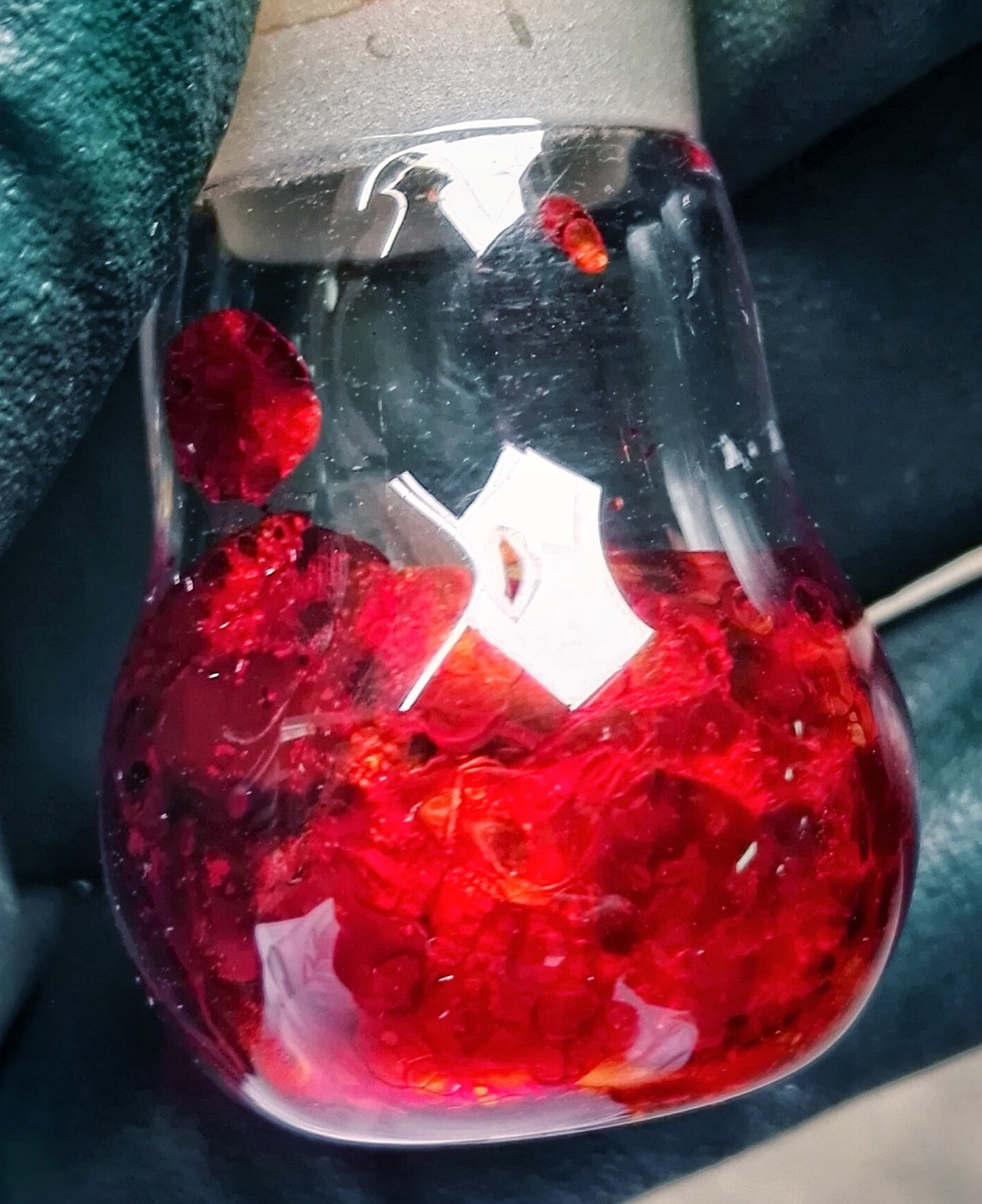
Curcumin becomes bright red when it interacts electrostatically with a phospholipid film

Curcumin incorporates a seven carbon linker and three major functional groups: an α,β-unsaturated β-diketone moiety and an aromatic O-methoxy-phenolic group. The aromatic ring systems, which are phenols, are connected by two α,β-unsaturated carbonyl groups. It is a diketone tautomer, existing in enolic form in organic solvents and in keto form in water. The diketones form stable enols and are readily deprotonated to form enolates, which bind metal ions to form acetylacetonate-like complexes. Its complexing properties are manifesting in its reaction with boric acid to give a red-colored rosocyanine.

Because of its hydrophobic nature, curcumin is poorly soluble in water but is easily soluble in organic solvents.

Curcumin and curcuminoids are chelators of metal ions, including iron and copper.

=== Biosynthesis ===
The biosynthetic route of curcumin is uncertain. In 1973, Peter J. Roughley and Donald A. Whiting proposed two mechanisms for curcumin biosynthesis. The first mechanism involves a chain extension reaction by cinnamic acid and 5 malonyl-CoA molecules that eventually arylize into a curcuminoid. The second mechanism involves two cinnamate units coupled together by malonyl-CoA. Both use cinnamic acid as their starting point, which is derived from the amino acid phenylalanine.

Plant biosynthesis starting with cinnamic acid is rare compared to the more common p-coumaric acid. Only a few identified compounds, such as anigorufone and pinosylvin, build from cinnamic acid.

Biosynthetic pathway of curcumin in Curcuma longa.

== Pharmacology ==
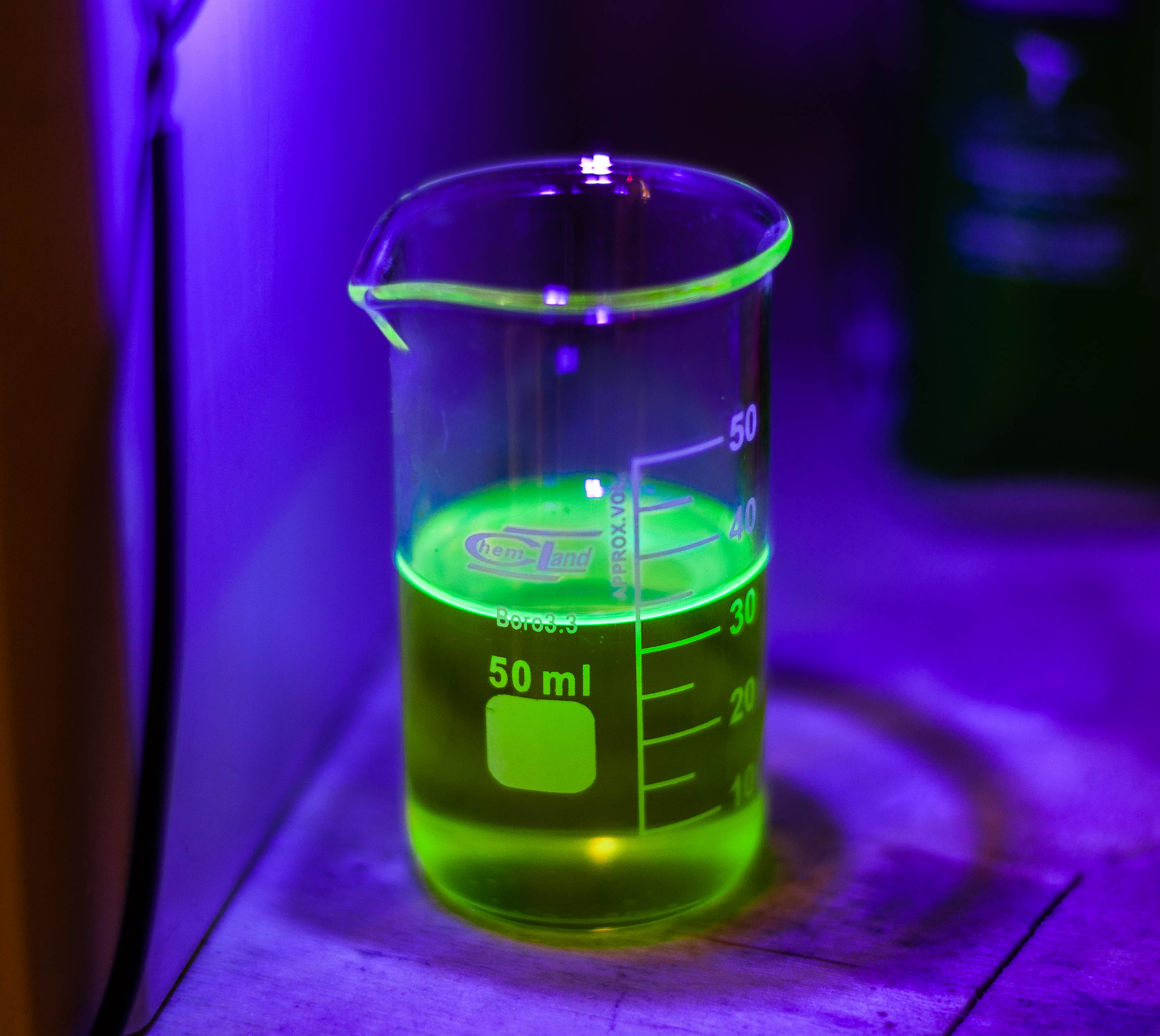
Curcumin displays green fluorescence under UV light

Curcumin, which shows positive results in most drug discovery assays, is regarded as a false lead that medicinal chemists include among "pan-assay interference compounds". This attracts undue experimental attention while failing to advance as viable therapeutic or drug leads, although some derivatives of curcumin such as EF-24 have been well-studied.

Factors that limit the bioactivity of curcumin or its analogs include chemical instability, water insolubility, absence of potent and selective target activity, low bioavailability, limited tissue distribution, and extensive metabolism. Very little curcumin escapes the GI tract and most is excreted in feces unchanged. If curcumin enters plasma in reasonable amounts, there is a high risk of toxicity since it promiscuously interacts with several proteins increasing the risk of adverse effects; these proteins include hERG, cytochrome P450s, and glutathione S-transferase.

== Safety ==
Although curcumin has been assessed in numerous laboratory and clinical studies, it has no medical uses. Its instability, reactivity, and poor bioavailability, make curcumin an unlikely drug candidate. Curcumin exhibits numerous interference properties which may lead to misinterpretation of results.

Between 1995 and 2017, the US government funded US$150 million in biomedical research into curcumin through the National Center for Complementary and Integrative Health. No support was found for curcumin as a medical treatment. As a component of turmeric, curcumin may interact with prescription drugs and dietary supplements. In high amounts, it may be unsafe for women during pregnancy. It may cause side effects, such as nausea, diarrhea, hives, or dizziness. Between 2004 and 2022 there were ten cases of liver injury caused by curcumin herbal and dietary supplements. Curcumin is a contact allergen.

The intended use of curcumin as a food additive is generally recognized as safe by the U.S. Food and Drug Administration.

=== Research fraud ===
Bharat Aggarwal, a former cancer researcher at the University of Texas MD Anderson Cancer Center, had 29 papers retracted due to research fraud as of July 2021. Aggarwal's research had focused on potential anti-cancer properties of herbs and spices, particularly curcumin, and according to a March 2016 article in the Houston Chronicle, "attracted national media interest and laid the groundwork for ongoing clinical trials".

Aggarwal cofounded a company in 2004 called Curry Pharmaceuticals based in Research Triangle Park, North Carolina, which planned to develop drugs based on synthetic analogs of curcumin. SignPath Pharma, a company seeking to develop liposomal formulations of curcumin, licensed three patents by Aggarwal related to that approach from MD Anderson in 2013.

=== Warnings about dietary supplements ===
Between 2018 and 2023, the U.S. FDA issued 29 warning letters to American manufacturers of dietary supplements for making false claims of anti-disease effects from using products containing curcumin. In each letter, the FDA stated that the supplement product was not an approved new drug because the "product is not generally recognized as safe and effective" for the advertised uses, that "new drugs may not be legally introduced or delivered for introduction into interstate commerce without prior approval from FDA", and that the "FDA approves a new drug on the basis of scientific data and information demonstrating that the drug is safe and effective".

=== Alternative medicine ===
Though there is no evidence for the safety or efficacy of using curcumin as a therapy, some alternative medicine practitioners give it intravenously, supposedly as a treatment for numerous diseases. In 2017, two serious cases of adverse events were reported from curcumin or turmeric products—one severe allergic reaction and one death—that were caused by administration of a curcumin-polyethylene glycol (PEG40) emulsion product by a naturopath. One treatment caused anaphylaxis leading to death.

== Stability ==
In 2016, laboratory research established and compared the radiosensitivity of three organic food colorants including curcumin, carmine, and annatto to create data to be used for application whenever food products containing these food colors were to undergo the radiation process. The researchers used spectrophotometry and capillary electrophoresis to establish radiosensitivity of the three organic food colorants. Carmine samples were quite stable against radiation treatment, annatto showed limited stability, and curcumin was found to be unstable, particularly when diluted.
