= Alice Tangerini =

American botanical illustrator and curator

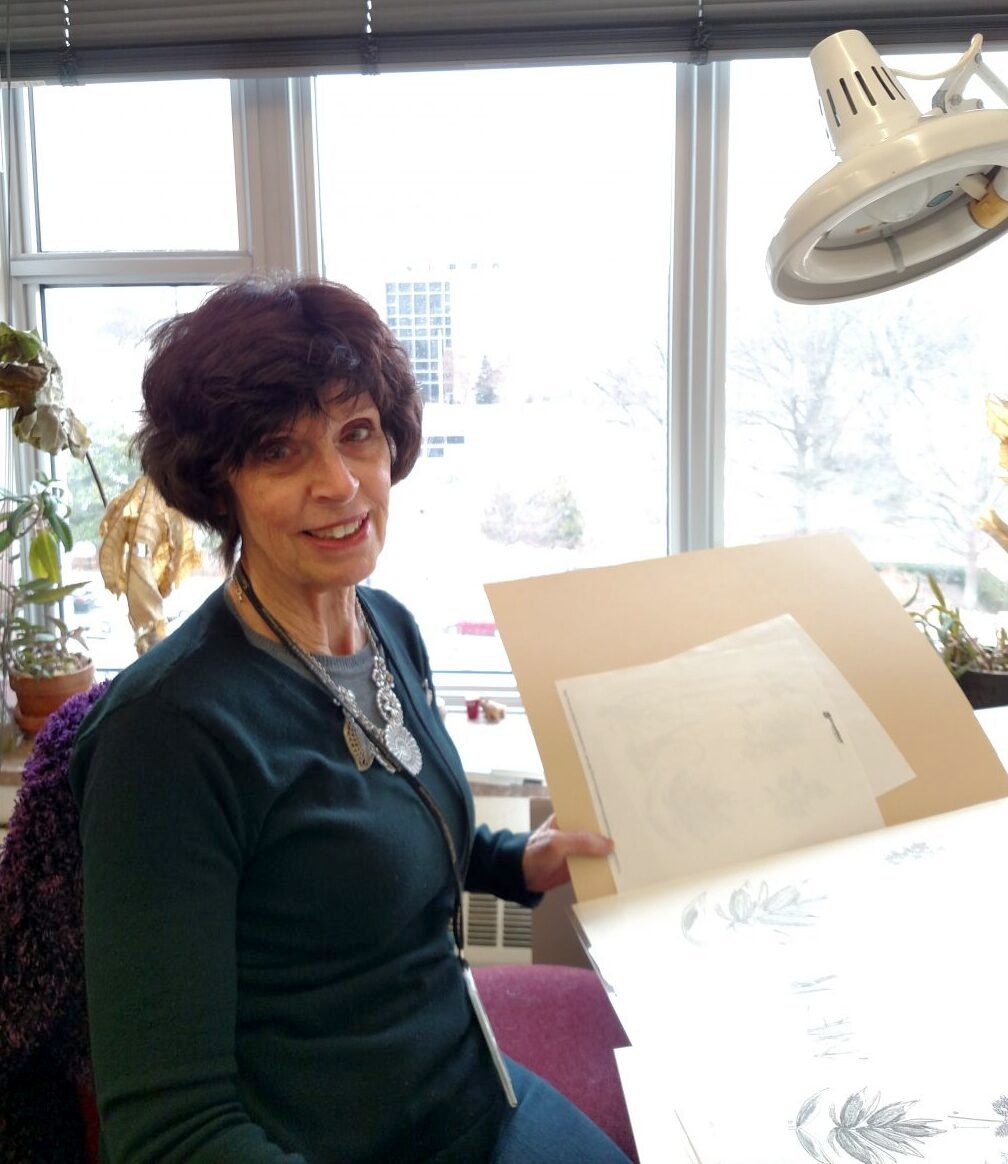
- Tangerini in 2017
- Born: Alice Ruth Tangerini; April 25, 1949 (age 77); Takoma Park, Maryland, United States
- Education: Virginia Commonwealth University School of the Arts (Bachelor of Fine Arts)
- Occupations: Botanical illustrator; curator
- Years active: 1972–present

Alice Ruth Tangerini (born April 25, 1949) is an American botanical illustrator and curator. She began her career in 1968 at the National Museum of Natural History (NMNH) after being hired by American botanist Lyman Bradford Smith. Following her graduation from Virginia Commonwealth University School of the Arts in 1972 with a Bachelor of Fine Arts in painting and printmaking, she joined the NMNH as a full-time staff illustrator. In 1984, Tangerini helped identify a new bromeliad species, which Smith and botanist Harold E. Robinson named Navia aliciae in recognition of her work. She sustained an injury in 2005 that left her with double vision in her right eye after surgery, but she has stated she will continue illustrating for as long as her eyesight allows. As of 2024, Tangerini remained the first and only botanical illustrator employed by the NMNH.

Tangerini's illustrations have appeared in academic journals, floras, books, monographs, and museum exhibits. She favors traditional tools such as pen-and-ink, brush and ink, and graphite, but also incorporates modern techniques like digital painting. Tangerini curates the Smithsonian Catalog of Botanical Illustrations and the NMNH's Botanical Art Collection. Along with curatorial work, she has taught classes and workshops on botanical illustration since 1976. Her accolades include the Jill Smythies Award and recognitions from the Guild of Natural Science Illustrators, the American Society of Botanical Artists, and the NMNH.

== Early life and education ==
Alice Ruth Tangerini was born on April 25, 1949, in Takoma Park, Maryland, and grew up in Kensington, Maryland. Interested in art from an early age, she became known in her neighborhood as the "girl who liked to draw"; in kindergarten, she preferred to create her own drawings rather than color in mimeographed pictures. As a child, she primarily drew horses, dogs, and dinosaurs; by high school, she had a portfolio consisting entirely of illustrations of horses and dogs. Tangerini described her eyesight as her greatest asset while growing up, particularly her ability to examine "something an inch from [her] face and see detail".

In 1968, while attending Montgomery College, Tangerini was encouraged by a neighbor to apply as a freelance botanical illustrator for Lyman Bradford Smith, the head of the Smithsonian Institution's botany department. When Smith asked to see examples of plant drawings during their initial meeting, the only botanical elements she could show from her portfolio were patches of grass beneath a horse's hooves. The following week, he brought her to the National Museum of Natural History (NMNH) and asked her to draw a botanical specimen; unsure what to do, she drew the dead plant as it looked rather than how it would appear alive in its native habitat. Smith hired Tangerini, and she worked for him on weekends and during the summers.

Beyond a single night class in botany at Montgomery College, Tangerini lacked a background in biology; scientists often assisted her with basic identification, and she initially relied on them to point out a plant's reproductive organs. Over the next three years, she developed the expertise to work more independently. Rather than depending on Smith's sketches and examples of to-scale drawings, she began conducting plant dissections and producing enlarged illustrations. In a 2018 retrospective profile, Smithsonian magazine's Leila McNeill wrote that Tangerini entered scientific illustration through "a bit of luck (and a lot of skill)", her early career being closer to an apprenticeship than the "formal college route" that would later become more common.

Tangerini received an associate degree in art from Montgomery College in 1970, followed by a Bachelor of Fine Arts in painting and printmaking from Virginia Commonwealth University School of the Arts (VCUarts) in 1972. Although she favored realism over abstraction during art school, her professors interpreted her horse paintings as possessing sexual undertones. In response, she developed this theme into a cartoon style that she described as a cross between the artists Walt Disney and Robert Crumb. The resulting horse cartoons proved popular at VCUarts and were featured in a 1972 solo exhibition at the college's gallery, where F. D. Cossitt—an art critic for the Richmond Times-Dispatch—referred to her work as "horse-erotica". After graduating from VCUarts, Tangerini worked at the Smithsonian as a full-time staff illustrator in the botany department under botanist Warren L. Wagner.

== Artistic style and process ==
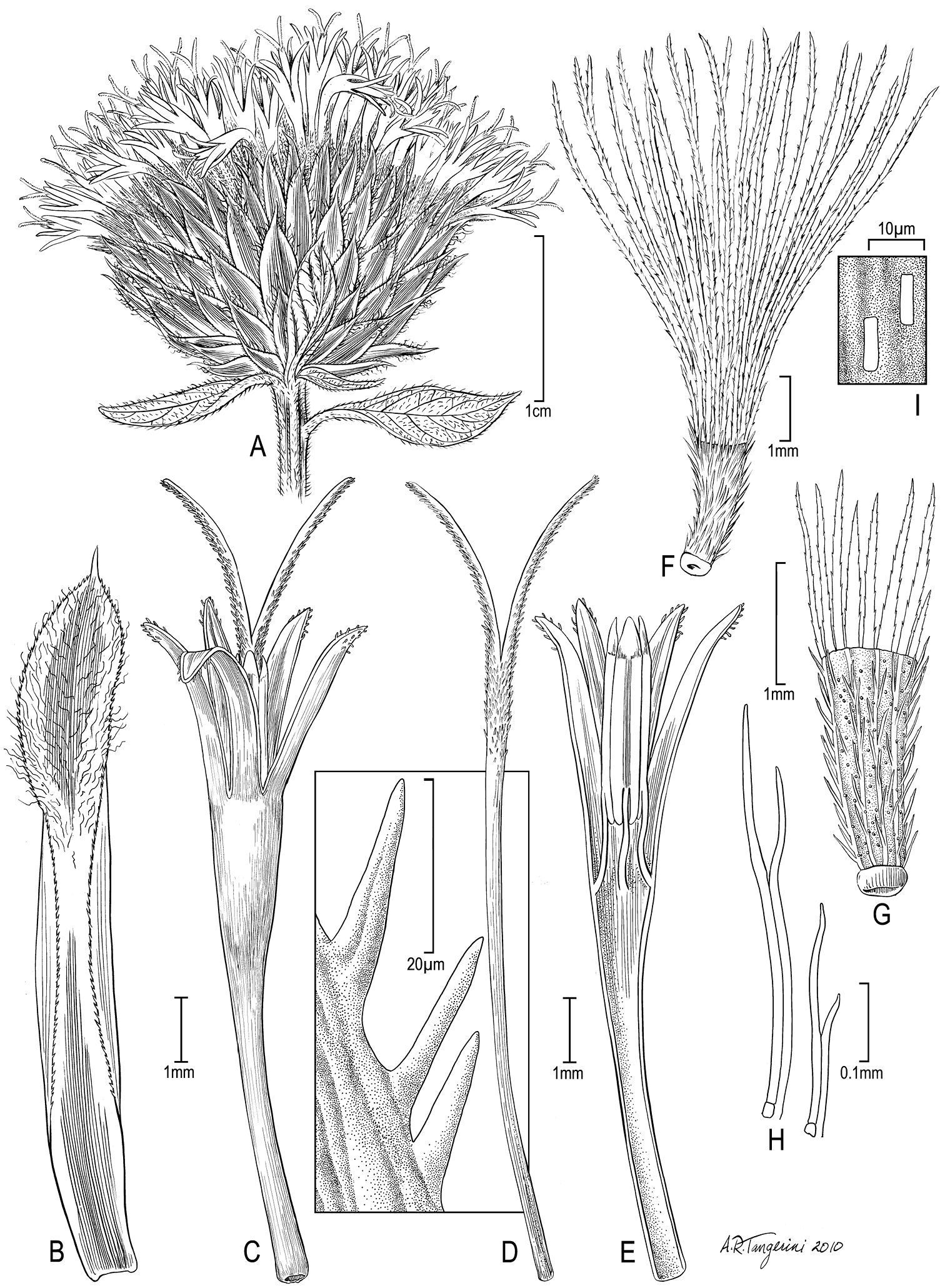
Nothovernonia purpurea as illustrated by Tangerini

Since joining the NMNH, Tangerini has illustrated more than 1,000 plant species. To prepare for an illustration, she typically spends about a week studying a plant; her research methods include rehydrating specimens, examining them under a microscope, and dissecting the plants and their seeds. She produces a sketch using a camera lucida to magnify and trace the subject. After a botanist reviews her work, she creates a final artistic rendering on drafting paper using a metal quill pen, brushes, and ink. She has worked from extremely limited material at times, such as a single sprig with a few leaves and flowers.

Following the traditions of botanical illustration, Tangerini emphasizes showing morphology and anatomy over color, creating idealized drawings by focusing on defining features and employing heavy line shading. She favors traditional tools, such as pen-and-ink, brush and ink, and graphite. Tangerini is interested in preserving historical drawing techniques and has a collection of instruments used by other illustrators, which she has described as "a little history of drawing that is slowly vanishing." Over time, she has incorporated modern techniques into her work, including digital painting and computer-based color illustrations. Her illustrations fill as much of the page as possible because of her dislike of empty space.

Tangerini's illustrations have appeared in academic journals, floras, books, monographs, museum exhibits, and plates. Although taxonomists constitute her primary audience, her work has also assisted botanists with field identification. Distinguishing her illustrations from fine art, Tangerini emphasized that their purpose is scientific: to clearly identify a plant's genus and species while preserving a lasting record of specimens for future study.

== Career ==
=== Illustration ===
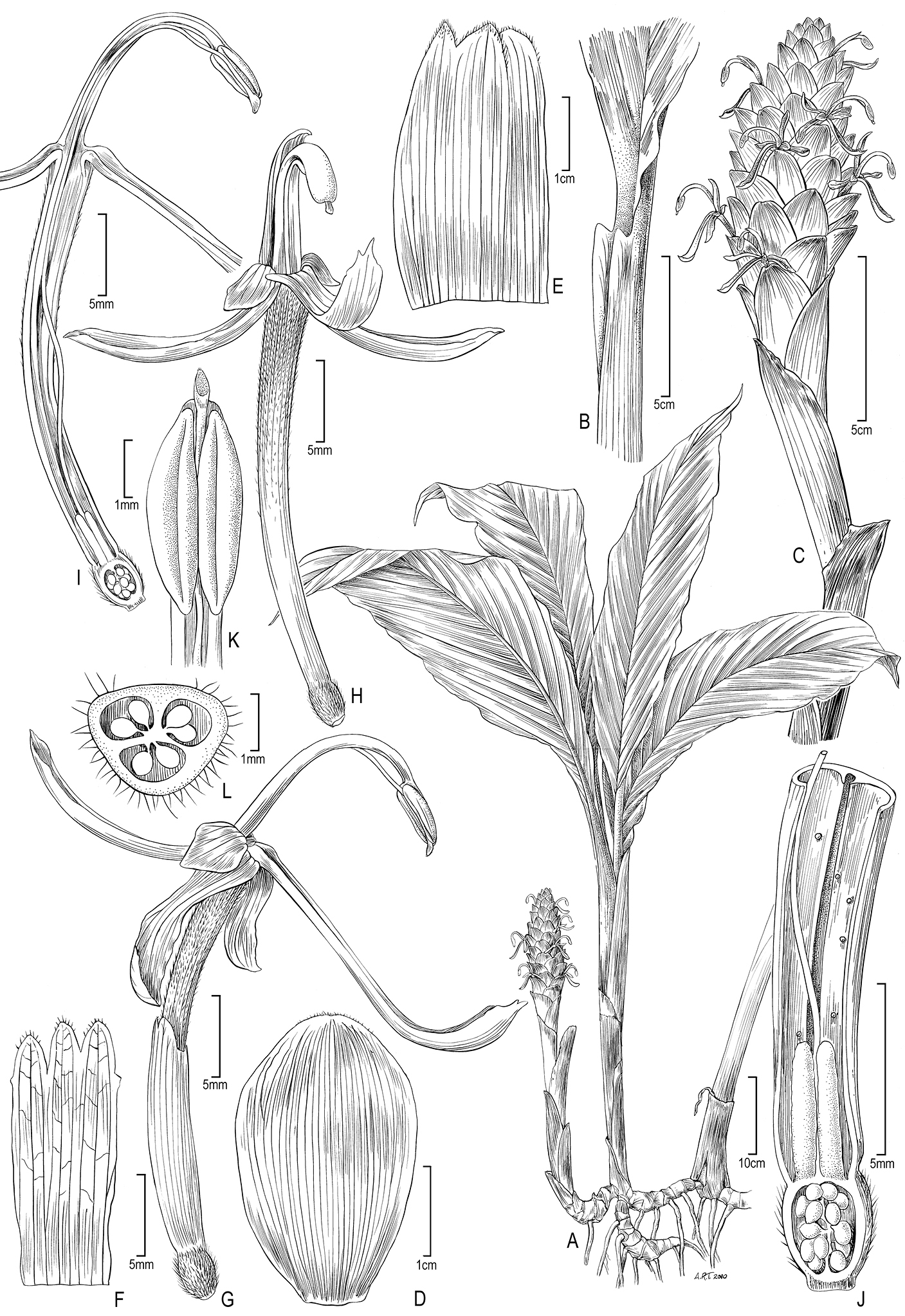
Larsenianthus wardianus as illustrated by Tangerini

Tangerini's illustrations have been widely exhibited and are held in the permanent collections of the Smithsonian Institution, the Hunt Institute for Botanical Documentation (HIBD), and the Brooklyn Botanic Garden. In 1980, the NMNH hosted a solo exhibition of her Arecaceae drawings, which were later presented at the HIBD. The NMNH featured her work again in 2010 as part of a collaborative exhibition with the American Society of Botanical Artists. In 2018, Tangerini's illustrations were included in exhibitions at the Washington National Cathedral, the United States Botanic Garden, and the Royal Botanic Garden, Sydney. The Smithsonian Gardens highlighted her in a 2022 online exhibition on orchids and women botanists, conservationists, and illustrators.

Although Tangerini primarily produces her illustrations in her NMNH office, often working from pressed and dried herbarium specimens, she has also traveled to observe flora in their natural environments at destinations like California, Hawaii, and Guyana. Trips typically last several weeks and involve long hours of drawing in laboratories to capture botanical details. During a 1992 expedition to Guyana, where government restrictions prohibited specimen collection, she spent days drawing in a tropical plant farm with limited electricity. On one of her trips to Hawaii, Tangerini drew the Zingiberales species for botanist W. John Kress, sketching outdoors in heavy rain during El Niño.

Tangerini observed that her perspective as an illustrator often leads her to notice details that botanists overlook. In 1984, botanists Lyman Bradford Smith and Harold E. Robinson asked Tangerini to illustrate a bromeliad specimen for the scientific journal Acta Botanica Venezuelica. (Note: A bromeliad is a flowering plant belonging to the family Bromeliaceae, which is native to tropical environments. Examples of bromeliads include pineapples and Spanish moss. Ulrich Boser of Smithsonian magazine referred to Navia aliciae as a type of "wild pineapple".) After noticing inconsistencies between the specimen and Smith's written description, she conducted further research and determined that it was a new species. Smith and Robinson named the plant Navia aliciae in recognition of her discovery. (Note: The description of Navia aliciae was published in a 1984 issue of Acta Botanica Venezuelica. The article credited botanist Julian Alfred Steyermark alongside Smith and Robinson. Acta Botanica Venezuelica focuses on Venezuela's flora and vegetation and was founded by botanist Tobías Lasser.)

Tangerini became visually impaired in her right eye after sustaining an unidentified injury in 2005. Reflecting on the experience in 2009, she remarked, "They don't have a diagnosis for it, they just say it's bad luck. You just worked so many years and one eye gave out." Although she underwent surgery later that year, it left her with double vision in the affected eye. Tangerini continued illustrating by relying on her left eye, for which Wagner suggested that she wear an eye patch and offered his son's pirate patch in support. She also gradually incorporated a graphics tablet and Adobe Photoshop into her workflow, using digital magnification to reduce strain on her remaining eye. While working with one eye became increasingly taxing, particularly during ten-hour workdays, she said that "as long as I can still use my good eye, I will still be drawing here."

As of 2024, Tangerini remained the first and only botanical illustrator employed by the NMNH. According to Smithsonian magazine, museums and botanical gardens often have only one or two illustrators due to a lack of funding. She has repeatedly stated that she is not planning to retire, citing her enjoyment of her work and her desire to develop further as an illustrator. Adrian Higgins of The Washington Post attributed this decision to a general decline in the field of botanical illustration, as the expense and labor involved in producing illustrated floras have proved prohibitive while molecular phylogenetics has received more attention.

=== Other professional activities ===
Tangerini has contributed to the preservation and presentation of botanical art. She curated an NMNH exhibition of artist Mary Vaux Walcott's wildflower watercolors in 1990 and digitized a collection of cactus art by botanical illustrator Mary Emily Eaton for the NMNH in 2009. She also manages the Smithsonian Catalog of Botanical Illustrations and curates works for the NMNH Botanical Art Collection. In a 2018 colloquium held by the American Association for the Advancement of Science, Tangerini advocated for the use of visual arts in scientific fields and shared her experiences working with botanist Kenneth Wurdack as an example of artist–scientist collaboration.

Tangerini has published six articles in PhytoKeys, Harvard Papers in Botany, The Botanical Artist, The Plant Press, and The American Gardener. (Note: The Botanical Artist was a journal published by the American Society of Botanical Artists. The Plant Press is a quarterly newsletter published by the NMNH's botany department and the United States National Herbarium. The American Gardener is a magazine published every two months by the American Horticultural Society.) As well as writing for The Plant Press, she serves as the newsletter's illustrator. Her other professional activities include designing the masthead for the newsletter The Bean Bag, (Note: The Bean Bag is an annual newsletter published by the Royal Botanic Gardens, Kew. Its target audience consists of scientists specializing in legume research.) serving on the boards of the American Society of Botanical Artists and BioScience, and joining the latter's editorial board as part of its initiative to draw greater attention to the arts within STEM fields. She is also a member of the Guild of Natural Science Illustrators, having helped plan the first of its annual meetings in 1979.

Tangerini has taught botanical and scientific illustration since 1976. She has offered classes at botanical institutions and gardens, universities, and fine art schools, (Note: Tangerini has taught classes at the following schools: the Corcoran School of the Arts and Design, the Minnesota School of Botanical Art, Graduate School USA, Montgomery College, and Virginia Commonwealth University. She has also held classes at botanical gardens in Richmond, Denver, and Phoenix, as well as at the National Tropical Botanical Garden in Hawaii and the Brookside Botanical Gardens in Maryland. She has also taught for the Smithsonian Associates, the Guild of Natural Science Illustrators, and the American Society of Botanical Artists.) as well as lectures, workshops, and demonstrations for artists, groups, and botanical societies. Emphasizing pen-and-ink techniques rather than digital tools, she encourages students to "capture the personality and the feel of every organism as they draw by hand". She has also served as a judge in juried competitions at universities and botanical gardens.

== Awards and recognition ==
Tangerini has received many honors for her contributions to botanical illustration. She was given the Distinguished Service Award from the Guild of Natural Science Illustrators in 1999, the Excellence in Scientific Botanical Art Award from the American Society of Botanical Artists in 2008, and the Jill Smythies Award from the Linnean Society of London in 2020. Her illustrations of Piper sotobosquense and Bahiana occidentalis received "Highly Commended" rankings at the Royal Botanic Garden, Sydney's Margaret Flockton Award Exhibitions in 2019 and 2025, respectively. After 50 years at the NMNH, she was presented with a career award from the museum in 2023.

Recognized for her role and influence within her field, Tangerini has been described as one of the best botanical illustrators and among the greatest American artists. Warren L. Wagner praised her as "irreplaceable", and Virginia Commonwealth University and Smithsonian Associates referred to her as a prominent figure in botanical illustration. Effie Kapsalis of the Smithsonian Institution Archives described Tangerini as a "groundbreaker" and featured her in the archive's "Wonderful Women Wednesday" series. Emma Saaty of Smithsonian magazine credited Tangerini with having "inspired a whole new generation of artists to preserve what is rapidly becoming an endangered field."

== Publications ==
- Funk, Vicki A.; Robinson, Harold; Tangerini, Alice R. (2013). "Whatever Happened to Bishopanthus (Compositae, Liabeae)?". PhytoKeys (30): 65–73. Bibcode:2013PhytK..30...65F. doi:10.3897/phytokeys.30.6652. PMC 3881356. PMID 24399900.
- Lorence, David H.; Wagner, Warren Lambert (2019). Khan, Nancy (ed.). Flora of the Marquesas Islands. Illustrated by Alice Tangerini. National Tropical Botanical Garden. ISBN 9780915809035. OCLC 1137728668 – via WorldCat.
- Tangerini, Alice (1998). "Mark Catesby's Natural History of America". The American Gardener. 77 (2): 60.
- Tangerini, Alice R. (1999). "I Go to Washington and Meet Dr. Smith". Harvard Papers in Botany. 4 (1): 97–102. JSTOR 41761288 – via JSTOR.
- Tangerini, Alice (2008). "Halftone Illustration with Plastic Pencils on Drafting Film: A Vanishing Art". The Botanical Artist. 14 (3): 3, 5. JSTOR 45037117 – via JSTOR.
- Tangerini, Alice (2013). "Merging Traditional and Digital Art in Botanical Illustration". The Botanical Artist. 19 (2): 6–7. JSTOR 48502575 – via JSTOR.
- Tangerini, Alice; Everly, Robin; Cardello, Sara (2016). "Botanical Illustrator, Alice Tangerini, Featured at Smithsonian Libraries Event" (PDF). The Plant Press. 19 (4). National Museum of Natural History: 7. Archived (PDF) from the original on May 7, 2026.
- Tangerini, Alice (2019). "Beyond the Technical Pen". The Botanical Artist. 25 (2): 22–23. JSTOR 48510209 – via JSTOR.
- Tippo, Oswald; Stern, William Louis (1977). Humanistic Biology. Illustrated by Alice Tangerini. W. W. Norton & Company. ISBN 978-0-393-09126-7 – via LuEsther T. Mertz Library.
- Whistler, W. Arthur (2022). Lorence, David H.; Wagner, Warren Lambert; Khan, Nancy (eds.). Flora of Samoa: Flowering Plants. Illustrated by Alice Tangerini. National Tropical Botanical Garden. ISBN 9780915809042. OCLC 1370121732 – via WorldCat.
