= List of ANAGPIC meetings =

This is a list of the annual meeting locations, themes, and student papers from the Association of North American Graduate Programs in the Conservation of Cultural Property (ANAGPIC).

- 1974, The Corning Museum of Glass

November 11–15, 1974 Conservation Seminar on Glass and Library Materials

- 1976, Art Conservation Department, Winterthur-University of Delaware

April 19–21, 1976 Outdoor Metal Sculpture and Conservation of Textiles

- 1977, Art Conservation Department, Queen's University at Kingston

May 9–11, 1977 Ethnographic Conservation

- 1978, Cooperstown Graduate Program, State University College at Oneonta

April 10–12, 1978 Problems in the Preservation of Paper

- 1979, Center for Conservation and Technical Studies, Harvard University

April 30-May 2, 1979 Interaction Between Curator and Conservator

- 1980, Art Conservation Department, Winterthur-University of Delaware

April 28–29, 1980 History of Artists' Techniques

- 1981, Conservation Center, Institute of Fine Arts, New York University

March 26–27, 1981 The Construction of the House: An Overture

- 1982, Art Conservation Department, Queen's University

May 5–7, 1982 Paper and Archival Conservation in Canada and The Federal and Provincial Presence in Canadian Conservation

- 1983, Art Conservation Department, Buffalo State College

May 1–3, 1983 Careers in Conservation

- 1984, Center for Conservation and Technical Studies, Harvard University

May 2–4, 1984 History and Future Directions of Conservation Training in North America

- 1985, Art Conservation Department, Winterthur-University of Delaware

May 2–3, 1985 The Conservation of Contemporary Art

- 1986, Conservation Center, Institute of Fine Arts New York University with the Conservation Education Program, School of Library Service, Columbia University

April 30-May 2, 1986 Environment and Collections: Extrinsic Conservation Strategies

- 1987, Art Conservation Program, Queen's University at Kingston

May 6–8, 1987 Conservation Management

- 1988, Art Conservation Department, Buffalo State College

May 4–6, 1988 Coping with Disaster: The Conservator's Role

- 1989, Center for Conservation and Technical Studies, Harvard University

April 28–29, 1989 Ethics in Conservation

- 1990, Art Conservation Department, Winterthur-University of Delaware

April 26–28, 1990 Beyond Fine Art: The Preservation of Large and Varied Collections

- 1991, Conservation Center, Institute of Fine Arts, New York University

April 25–27, 1991 The Price of Preservation: Our Access to Egypt's Past

- 1992, Art Conservation Program, Queen's University at Kingston

May 7–9, 1992 First Peoples' Art and Artifacts: Heritage and Conservation Issues

- 1993, Art Conservation Department, Buffalo State College

April 15–17, 1993 The Conservation of the Photographic Image

- 1994, Furniture Conservation Training Program, Smithsonian Center for Materials Research and Education

April 21–23, 1994 Using and Preserving Research Collections

- 1995, Art Conservation Department, Winterthur-University of Delaware

April 20–22, 1995 Preventive Conservation and Exhibits: Management Strategies

- 1996, Straus Center for Conservation, Harvard University

April 18–20, 1996 Conservation Laboratory Design and Renovation

- 1997, Conservation Center, Institute of Fine Arts, New York University

April 24–26, 1997 Preserving the Library

- 1998, Art Conservation Program, Queen's University at Kingston

May 1–2, 1998 Research the Object: The Evidence

- 1999, Art Conservation Department, Buffalo State College

April 22–24, 1999 The Past as Prologue: Conservation Tomorrow

- 2000, Smithsonian's Museum Conservation Institute

April 27–29, 2000

The student papers below were presented on April 28, 2000 at the S. Dillon Ripley Center of the Smithsonian Institution.
- Jon Brandon, Smithsonian Center, The Specialized Framing Technology in the Undercarriage of Preindustrial American Windsor Chairs
- Betsy Geiser, Buffalo State College, Barbie's Great-Great Grandmother: A Study of the Manufacture and Materials of Queen Anne Style Dolls
- Scott Gerson, Heather Hendry, and Bonnie MacLean, Queen's University, 10,000 Fragments: Piecing Together a 19th-Century Wall Map
- Meghan Goldman, New York University, Examination of Early Andy Warhol Hand-Colored Lithographs
- Dulce Maria Grimaldi, Queen's University, New Research on the Technique of the Mural Paintings at Templo Mayor Archaeological Site of the Aztecs
- Jennifer Hain, University of Texas at Austin, Collections Conservation in a Natural History Museum Library: Preserving Oversized Journals
- Tara Kennedy, University of Texas at Austin, Spectrofluorometric Examination of Ball Point Inks - A Preliminary Analytical Study
- Molly McNamara, Harvard University, Technical Examination of Ancient Greek Helmets in the Harvard University of Art Museums
- Holly Salmon, Winterthur-University of Delaware, Samurai Kote: Research and Treatment of Flood Damaged Armor Sleeves
- Sandra Sardjono, New York University, Detection of Hidden Infestation by Fourier Transform Infrared Spectroscopy (FTIR)
- Sara Shpargel, Buffalo State College, Photo Buttons on the Mend
- Ellen D. Tully, Winterthur-University of Delaware, Your Objects Don't Dance and Your Paintings Don't Rock and Roll: Storage Solutions for Earthquake Prone Areas
- Friederike Zimmern, Harvard University, Kandinsky's Winter Landscape: A Question of Authenticity

- 2001, Art Conservation Department, Winterthur-University of Delaware

April 19–21, 2001

- 2002, Straus Center for Conservation and Technical Studies, Harvard University

April 18–20, 2002

The student papers below were presented on April 18–20, 2002 at the Straus Center for Conservation and Technical Studies, Harvard University.
- Tatiana Bareis, Winterthur-University of Delaware, Maxfield Parrish’s Mural for Granogue: An Exploration of the History, Materials, Technique, and Conservation
- Kate Smith Maurer, Harvard University, A Study of George Inness’s Underdrawing
- Geneviève Saulnier, Queen’s University, Cleaning Unvarnished Acrylic Emulsion Films Using Dry Cleaning Methods
- Nora Lockshin, University of Texas at Austin, Schnitzelbank – A Case Study of Deteriorating Cellulose Acetate in Books
- Kristi Dahm, New York University, A Technical Study of Seven 15th Century Italian Metalpoint Drawings: Techniques for Metalpoint Identification and Implications for Attribution Studies
- Sarah Reidell, University of Texas at Austin, Testing Texas History: The José Enrique de la Peña Diary
- Amy Jones, Harvard University, Establishing the Restoration History of Harvard’s Marble Statue of a Young Boy Running
- Éowynn Kerr, Buffalo State College, The Not So Secret Formulas of Jacques Maroger: An Inve4stigation of the Manufacture and use of Maroger Mediums
- Cheryl Podsiki, Queen’s University and Iris Koch, Ellen Lee, Chris Ollsen, Kenneth Reimer, Environmental Sciences Group, Royal Military College of Canada, Kingston, Ontario, Canada, Pesticide Contaminated Artifacts and the Conservator
- Sarah Barack and Beth Edelstein, New York University, Conservation of Decorative Plasterwork at the Merchant’s House Museum, New York City
- Judy L. Dion, Winterthur-University of Delaware, The Treatment, Examination, and History of a 19th Century Painted Leather Fire Bucket from Portsmouth, New Hampshire
- Emily O'Brien, Buffalo State College, The Examination and treatment of a Painted Gilt Leather Folding Screen

- 2003, Conservation Center, Institute of Fine Arts, New York University

April 24–26, 2003

- 2004, Art Conservation Department, Queen's University at Kingston
- 2005, Art Conservation Department, Buffalo State College

The student papers below were presented.
- Brian Baade and Natasha Loeblich, Winterthur-University of Delaware, Collaborative Efforts for Paint Analysis: Two Opportunities for Technical Examination of Major Works in Tandem With Outside Institutions
- Katherine Beaty, Buffalo State College, 21st- Century Remedies to 19th- Century Repairs of an 18th- Century Turkish Koran
- Kim Cullen Cobb, Queen’s University, Charred Wood Consolidated with Thermoplastic Resins
- Susan Costello, Harvard University, An Investigation of Early Chinese Bronze Mirrors at The Harvard University Art Museums
- Corey D’Augustine, New York University, Drill Team: Vaseline, Hair, and Paperclips
- Bart Devolder, Harvard University, Two 15th- c. Italian Paintings on Fine-Weave Supports and Their Relationship to Netherlandish Canvas Painting
- Angela Elliott, Buffalo State College, A Comparative Study of Basket Cleaning Methods Including Nd:YAG Lasers
- Maria Gonzalez, University of Texas at Austin, Revealing Networks: A Case Study of Disaster Response and Recuperation
- Dana Melchar, Winterthur-University of Delaware, Investigation of a High Chest and Dressing Table, en suite
- Holly Robertson, University of Texas at Austin, An Exploration of Non-adhesive Binding Structures Found in the Archives at Vilassar de Dalt
- David Turnbull, Queen’s University, Fishing for Answers: Dorothy Cameron’s “The Lost Goddess”
- Gawain Weaver, New York University, Capital Portraits: Conservation of the Topley Studio Index

- 2006, Art Conservation Department, Winterthur-University of Delaware

The student papers below were presented.
- Tish Brewer, University of Texas at Austin, The Nature of Forgeries: Iron Gall Ink and Paper Aging in Relation to Forged Historical Documents - An Independent Study
- Rebecca Capua, New York University, Materials and Techniques of George Grosz: American Watercolors
- Catherine Coueignoux, Winterthur-University of Delaware, An Exploration of Surface: Deciphering the History and Meaning of the Winterthur Peter Stretch Clock's Finish
- Amy Crist, Buffalo State College, An Investigation of the Characteristics, Compositions, and Identification Methods of Wax Crayons and Colored Pencils, Including a Case Study of a Drawing by Roberto Matta
- Matt Cushman, Winterthur-University of Delaware, A New Method for the Treatment of Iron-Stained Architectural Marble: in situ reduction of iron(III) using photovoltaic polymers and the introduction of a new chelating agent for conservation
- Lindsay Haynes, Queen's University, An Investigation into the Materials, Structure and Degradation Behavior of Portraits by William Sawyer
- Jo-Fan Huang, Harvard University, A Technical Examination of 7 Thai Manuscripts in the 18th, 19th, and 20th Centuries
- Sandra Kelberlau, Harvard University, How One Landscape-Painter Paints: The Technique of Sanford Robinson Gifford
- Mary Oey, New York University, Some Problems in Musical Instrument Conservation in Museum Collections
- Sara Ribbans, Queen's University, Past Practices Causing Modern Problems: The Conservation of Three Jules Cheret Posters
- Dana K. Senge, Buffalo State College, Analysis and Treatment of a Chinese Ceramic Mortuary Figure
- Jim Thurn, University of Texas at Austin, Research on Methods to Remove Mold from Cellulose Acetate Audiotape

- 2007, Straus Center for Conservation and Technical Studies, Harvard University

The student papers below were presented.
- Snowden Becker, University of Texas at Austin, See No Evil, Hear No Evil: Audiovisual Evidence, Forensics, and Preservation in Law Enforcement
- Morwenna Blewett, Harvard University, A Puzzle to the Critics: The Technical Analysis and Treatment of a 16th Century Panel Painting of Possible French Origin
- Marie-Catherine Cyr, Queen's University, Conservation Issues: The Case of Time-Based Media Installations
- Alisa Eagleston, New York University, The Conservation of a Baining Headdress
- Anne R. Grady, Buffalo State College, Technical Examination and Treatment of an African Sword
- Amber Kerr-Allison, Winterthur-University of Delaware, Outdoor Public Murals: Materials, Advocacy and Conservation
- Jennifer Kim, New York University, Jaime Davidovich's Foam TV: An Interplay of Research, Interview, and Discussion to Determine Appropriate Treatment Avenues and the Acceptability of Replication
- Crystal Maitland, Queen's University, Where Archival and Fine Art Conservation Meet: Antioxidant and Deacidification Treatments of Corrosive Copper Watercolours Associated with Iron Gall Ink in Works of Art on Paper
- Samantha Sheesley, Buffalo State College, Artist Interviews as a Tool for Diligent Conservation Practice
- Theresa Smith, Harvard University, Bleaching and Color Reversion in Ingres Drawings at the Fogg Museum
- Samantha Springer, Winterthur-University of Delaware, An Examination of Alterations to Mississippian Period Native Copper Artifacts from the Collection of the National Museum of the American Indian

- 2008, Conservation Center of the Institute of Fine Arts, New York University

The student papers below were presented.
- Aimee Ducey, New York University, Conservation of Installation Art: Joseph Beuys's Aus Berlin: Neues vom Kojoten
- Lisa Duncan and Jessica Keister, Winterthur-University of Delaware, In Pursuit of Reality: A Technical Study of 2 Obscure Photographic Processes of the 19th Century
- Fletcher Durant, University of Texas at Austin, Revisiting the (Recent) History of Publishers’ Bindings as Artifacts
- Jocelyn Evans, Harvard University, Sacrifice of Isaac by Antonio di Donnino del Mazziere: Technical Analysis and Conservation Treatment
- Erin Gordon, Queen's University, Comparing Paper Extract to Traditional Toning Materials
- Ainslie Harrison, Queen's University, The Effects of Butvar B-98 on Bronze
- Elizabeth Homberger, Buffalo State College, Contextualizing the Nontangible: The Research and Treatment of a Collection of African Medicine
- Tara Hornung, Anna Serotta, and Diana Johnson, New York University, The Challenge of Attribution: Technical Examination of a Bronze Ding
- Sharon Norquest, Winterthur-University of Delaware, Preventing Poultice Problems: A Study of Ceramic Stain Reduction

- 2009, Art Conservation Department, Buffalo State College

The student papers below were presented.
- Sharra Grow, Winterthur-University of Delaware, When New and Improved Becomes Outdated and Degraded: The Technical Study and Treatment of a 1964 Pop Art Painted Collage
- Lauren Anne Horelick, University of California, Los Angeles/Getty, The Occurrence and Detection of Gunpowder in Haitian Vodou Charms; The Pakèt Kongo
- Eliza Spaulding, New York University, Evolving Authenticity in Henri Matisse's The Swimming Pool
- Marie Stewart, Winterthur-University of Delaware, The Investigation and Treatment of a Javanese Shadow Puppet from the University of Pennsylvania Museum of Archaeology and Anthropology

- 2010, Art Conservation Department, Queen's University at Kingston

The student papers below were presented.
- Nicole Ledoux, University of California, Los Angeles/Getty, Treatment and Technical Study of a Lakota Beaded Hide
- Meaghan Monaghan, Queen's University, Effects of Concentration and Artificial Ageing on the Strength and Reversibility of Dynamic® 208 Wallcovering Adhesive
- Cindy Lee Scott, Elizabeth Drolet, and Rita Blaik, University of California, Los Angeles/Getty and Department of Materials Science and Engineering at the University of California, Los Angeles, The Chemical Characterization and Removal of Lac Dye Staining on White-Ground Ceramics

- 2011, Art Conservation Department, Winterthur-University of Delaware

April 14–16, 2011

The student papers below were presented April 15, 2011.
- Elizabeth Drolet, University of California, Los Angeles/Getty, Time, Erosion and Earthen Architecture: Documenting the Effectiveness of Protective Shelters for Mud-Brick Structures
- Amber Harwood, Queen's University, Analysis of the Physical Characteristics of Transparent Cellulosic Nanofiber Paper
- Hai-Yen Nguyen, Queen's University, Low-Flux Neutron and Megavoltage Gamma Computed Tomography for the Non-Destructive Imaging for Archaeology and Art Conservation
- Robin O'Hern, University of California, Los Angeles/Getty, On the Surface: A Cultural and Scientific Analysis of the Applied Surface from Two West African Komo Masks

- 2012, Conservation Center of the Institute of Fine Arts, New York University

April 12–14, 2012

The student papers below were presented April 13, 2012 in the Gilder Lehrman Hall auditorium.
- Kristin Bradley and Sophie Scully, New York University, Preserving a Palimpsest: The History and Treatment of the Saletta delle Rovine
- Margaret Wessling, New York University, Characterizing United Press International’s Unifax Facsimile Prints

- 2013, University of California, Los Angeles/ Getty

April 25–27, 2013 L-A-NAGPIC 2013

The student papers below were presented April 26, 2013 at the Getty Center.
- Dina Anchin, Straus Center for Conservation and Technical Studies, Refining Style: Technical Investigation of an Early Work by Georges Pierre Seurat in the Maurice Wertheim Collection
- Annika Finne, New York University, Flora or Folly? Assessing the Risks of Plant-Based Art
- Jessica Ford and Courtney Von Stein Murray, Winterthur-University of Delaware, Arabian Knights: Conserving a 1953 Pinball Back Glass
- Ashley Freeman, Michael Doutre, George Bevan, and Alison Murray, Queen's University, Craquelure Documentation and Analysis: A Preliminary Process Using Reflectance Transformation Imaging and ImageJ
- Tessa Gadomski, Winterthur-University of Delaware, The Miscellaneous Works of Charles Barrell
- Sonia Kata, Queen's University, Chitosan as a Consolidant for Fragile Silk
- Caitlin Mahony, University of California, Los Angeles/Getty, Mending Leather and Quillwork on a Native American Vest: The Challenges and Achievements
- Casey Mallinckrodt, University of California, Los Angeles/Getty, This Old Foot: Technical Analysis of a Ptolemaic Child Sarcophagus to Identify Structural Components Repurposed from Other Ancient Coffins
- Harry Metcalf, Straus Center for Conservation and Technical Studies, Corita Kent: A Technical Study of a Group of Screen Prints
- Laura Neufeld, Buffalo State College, Problem Children: Technical Analysis and Conservation Treatment of Two Works on Paper by Karel Appel
- Fran Ritchie, Buffalo State College, The Investigation and Conservation Treatment of a Mounted Juvenile Orangutan

- 2014, Art Conservation Department, Buffalo State College

April 10–13, 2014 Extreme Conservation

The student papers below were presented April 11, 2014.
- Megan Salazar-Walsh, Buffalo State College, Learning from The Governess: The treatment and technical study of a Chardin replica
- Georgina Rayner, Harvard University, Elemental identification of pigments used in traditional bark paintings in the Northern Territory
- Claire Curran, Winterthur-University of Delaware, Conserving the Contemporary: A look into the challenges of conserving cuttlefish bone and egg
- Kari Rayner, New York University, Cast in Flames: A Finish Analysis of Robert Chanler’s Whitney Studio Fireplace
- Alexis North, University of California, Los Angeles, Analysis and Conservation of a Pair of Cherokee Black-dyed Buckskin Moccasins: Preliminary Results
- Erin Kraus, Queen's University, Comparison of the Preparation of Klucel G Pre-made Mending Tissue Using Isopropanol and Ethanol and Three Methods of Reactivation
- Melissa Swanson, Columbia University, The Performance of Consolidants of Three North American Sandstones
- Kevin Wohlgemuth, University of Pennsylvania, Revisiting Gordion’s Pebble Mosaic Pavement: Recent research, analysis and testing
- Aaron Burgess, Buffalo State College, Shattered Earth: The Treatment of an Illuminated Art Deco Clock and Globe
- Shannon Brogdon-Grantham and Michelle Sullivan, Winterthur-University of Delaware, New Approaches to Cleaning Works on Paper and Photographic Materials
- Betsy Burr, University of California, Los Angeles, Chemical Analysis of Archaeological Peruvian Textiles
- Stephanie Barnes, Queen's University, Severe Delamination in Nu Féminin (1967) by Montreal Artist Jori Smith: A Case Study
- Eve Mayberger, New York University, Radiography & Replication as Investigative Tools for Conservation Research: The Dummy Mummy Project
- Nicole Ledoux, Harvard University, Delaying the Inevitable: An Investigation of Plastic Deterioration in Joseph Beuys Multiples

== Sources ==
- ANAGPIC. North American Graduate Programs in the conservation of cultural property: histories, alumni.. Buffalo, NY: ANAGPIC, 2000. http://cool.conservation-us.org/anagpic/histalum_full.pdf
- Buffalo State College. "ANAGPIC 2014 Buffalo | Art Conservation | Buffalo State." Art Conservation | Buffalo State. http://artconservation.buffalostate.edu/students/anagpic-2014-buffalo (accessed April 18, 2014).
- Conservation OnLine (CoOL). "The Association of North American Graduate Programs in Conservation." The Association of North American Graduate Programs in Conservation. http://cool.conservation-us.org/anagpic/index.htm (accessed April 22, 2014).
- New York University. "Newsgram: News in Brief from the Conservation Center, Issue 18, July 2012." Institute of Fine Arts, New York University, Art Conservation Department. https://www.nyu.edu/gsas/dept/fineart/pdfs/publications/Newsgram18_ANAGPIC2012.pdf (accessed April 18, 2014).
- Queen's University at Kingston. "Queen's Art Conservation Newsletter, 2011-2012." Queen's Art Conservation Department. http://www.queensu.ca/art/artconservation/Alumni/MACNewsletter_2011-2012.pdf (accessed April 22, 2014).
- Smithsonian's Museum Conservation Institute. "Museum Conservation Institute 2000 ANAGPIC26." Smithsonian Museum Conservation Institute. http://www.si.edu/mci/english/professional_development/past_courses_programs/courses/ANAGPIC26.html (accessed April 22, 2014).
