= Guild of Natural Science Illustrators =

Non-profit organization of illustrators

The Guild of Natural Science Illustrators (GNSI) is an international non-profit organization based in Washington, D.C. to serve the field of visual science communication, including scientific illustration, medical illustration, and botanical illustration.

== History ==
The organization was founded in 1968 by a group of scientific and botanical illustrators working for the Smithsonian Institution, including Carolyn Bartlett Gast. It began as a network for the Institution's scientific illustrators to connect across different departments, but quickly expanded to include illustrators at other institutions as well as freelancers.

The majority of the Guild's activity each year takes place at their annual conference (Visual SciComm Conference). These conferences are typically based in the United States, though conferences have also been hosted in Évora, Portugal (2000) and Brisbane, Australia (2019). Local year-round activities occur in Guild groups or chapters. These groups and chapters cover a smaller geographic area, such as the Finger Lakes Region or the Great Plains. Chapters host local meet-ups, workshops, and group exhibitions to promote the professional activity of their members and perform outreach to the local community. Chapter exhibitions often focus on topical scientific issues, such as local wildlife or the connection between biodiversity loss and food insecurity.

The Guild is responsible for publishing the Journal of Natural Science Illustration (JNSI) three times each year. Typical JNSI articles include professional advice, technique tutorials, book reviews in the field, member work, and historical insights.

Similar organizations include the Association of Medical Illustrators and American Society of Botanical Artists.

== Conferences ==
The first meetings were held in 1968 in Washington, D.C., and by 1979 had grown to annual conferences held each summer. Conferences between 2020 and 2023 were held virtually due to the COVID-19 pandemic. In 2024 the Guild announced that it would host in-person conferences and virtual conferences on alternating years, starting with a 2025 in-person conference at Bridgewater State University in Bridgewater, Massachusetts.

Conference activities include plenary talks from professionals in science or scientific illustration, concurrent talks, a live technique demonstration, workshops, field trips to local science or nature activities, and a reception for a juried members exhibition at an exhibit space local to the conference area.

=== Conference locations ===
Conference locations change annually. They are most frequently held on university campuses. Several locations, such as University of California, Santa Cruz, Arcadia University, Rhode Island School of Design, and Savannah College of Art and Design were selected because the institutions have majors or significant coursework for scientific illustration at an undergraduate or certificate level.

=== Notable conference speakers ===
- Terryl Whitlatch, creature designer and scientific illustrator
- James Gurney, author and paleoartist
- Jen Christiansen, Scientific American senior graphics editor
- Fernando Baptista, National Geographic senior graphics editor
- Kirk Johnson (scientist), paleontologist and National Museum of Natural History Sant Director
- Alice Tangerini, National Museum of Natural History staff botanical illustrator
- Dick Rauh, art director, botanist, and botanical illustrator
- David Goodsell, structural biologist and scientific illustrator
- Jane Kim (artist), muralist
- Ben Zhao, lead computer scientist on anti-AI projects Glaze and Nightshade
- Tim Low, Australian biologist and author
- Ray Troll, artist

== See also ==
- Technical drawing
- Botanical illustration
- Medical illustration
- Archaeological illustration
- Paleoart
- Information visualization
