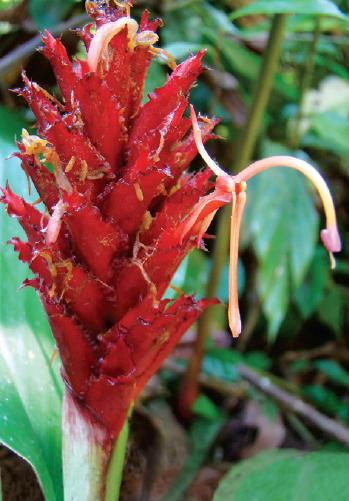
- Larsenianthus assamensis flower

Scientific classification
- Kingdom: Plantae
- Clade: Tracheophytes
- Clade: Angiosperms
- Clade: Monocots
- Clade: Commelinids
- Order: Zingiberales
- Family: Zingiberaceae
- Subfamily: Zingiberoideae
- Tribe: Zingibereae
- Genus: Larsenianthus; W.J.Kress & Mood

= Larsenianthus =

Genus of plants

Larsenianthus is a genus of monocotyledonous plants in the ginger family (Zingiberaceae). The genus was established in 2010. The four or so species are native to the area of the eastern Himalayas.

== Description ==
Larsenianthus species grow as evergreen, perennial herbaceous plants that can reach heights of 1 to 2.5 meters. They stand in groups of ten to twenty plants and form rhizomes. Depending on the species, the plants have two to twelve alternately arranged, sessile or stalked leaves.

The inflorescences stand on leafed inflorescence shafts or at the base of leafless side shoots. Depending on the type, 35 to 80 curved or flat, scale-like bracts are connected at the base with the inflorescence and are arranged in a spiral. At the base of the inflorescence, additional side shoots can sometimes occur with sterile bracts. The bracts are of different sizes with the inner ones being larger. The conspicuous flowers are rarely solitary, usually in twos or six in a wrap. The lower flowers always open first.

The tubular, triple-toothed sepals are smaller than the petals. The long, tubular petals are curved and have a rectangular opening. The edge of the flower is thickened and rounded on two sides by the base of the staminodes and the labellum. The side standing, small staminodes are bowl-shaped. The elongated, spade- or inverted-lanceolate labellum is broad at the tip and becomes narrower towards the base of the leaf. The labellum base is V-shaped in cross section or has a raised center, its edges are thickened. The edge of the labellum tip can be toothed. The long, fertile stamens are curved over the labellum and have elongated anthers. Three carpels have grown together to form a three-chamber ovary.

The elongated capsule fruits contain a number of seeds in each half of the capsule, which are divided into three separate fruit compartments. The one to ten seeds are surrounded by a fleshy shell (aril).

== Range ==
They grow in the South Asian tropics mainly in forest areas.

The natural range of Larsenianthus species includes northeastern Bangladesh, northeastern India, and northern Myanmar

== Taxonomy ==
The first description of the genus Larsenianthus was made in 2010 by Walter John Emil Kress and John Donald Mood in phytokeys, No. 1, pp. 21, (23). The type species is Larsenianthus careyanus (Benth.) WJKress & Mood, which was previously assigned to the genus Hitchenia. The genus name Larsenianthus honors Kai Larsen(1926–2012) from Aarhus University in Denmark, an expert in the systematics of the Zingiberaceae. Anthusis the Greek word for flower.

There are four species of Larsenianthus:

- Larsenianthus arunachalensis M.Sabu, Sanoj & T.Rajesh Kumar : It occurs from the Indian state of Arunachal Pradesh to northern Myanmar.
- Larsenianthus assamensis S.Dey, Mood, & S.Choudhury : It occurs only in the Indian state of Assam.
- Larsenianthus careyanus (Benth.) WJKress & Mood : It occurs in northeastern Bangladesh, Assam, Myanmar and in the eastern Himalayas.
- Larsenianthus wardianus W.J. Kress, Thet Htun & Bordelon : It occurs in northern Myanmar.

Cladogram according to Catalog of Life:

Larsenianthus

- Larsenianthus arunachalensis
- Larsenianthus assamensis
- Larsenianthus careyanus
- Larsenianthus wardianus
