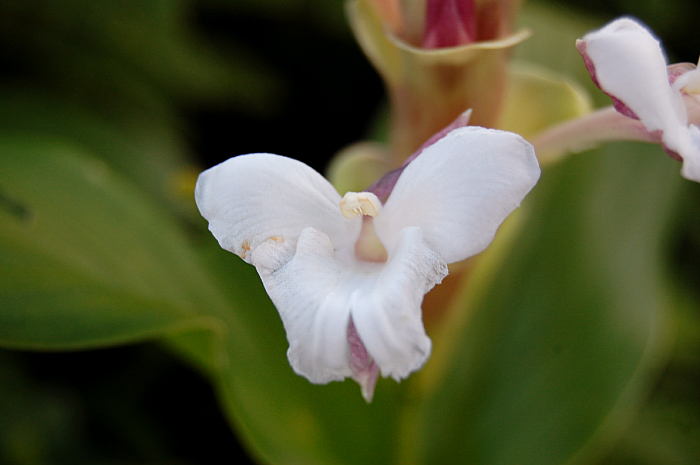

Scientific classification
- Kingdom: Plantae
- Clade: Tracheophytes
- Clade: Angiosperms
- Clade: Monocots
- Clade: Commelinids
- Order: Zingiberales
- Family: Zingiberaceae
- Subfamily: Zingiberoideae
- Tribe: Zingibereae
- Genus: Curcuma
- Species: C. glauca

Binomial name
- Curcuma glauca (Wall.) Škorničk. (2015)

Synonyms
- Curcuma glaucophylla Wall. (1832), nom. nud.; Dischema glaucum (Wall.) Voigt (1845); Hitchenia glauca Wall. (1834 publ. 1835)

= Curcuma glauca =

Genus of flowering plants

Curcuma glauca is a species of flowering plant in the ginger family, Zingiberaceae. It is a rhizomatous geophyte endemic to Myanmar. The plant, which is called malaphu (မာလာဖူး) in Burmese, is used as an herb in Burmese cuisine.

== Taxonomy ==
The species was first described as Hitchenia glauca by Nathaniel Wallich in 1835. The genus Hitchenia has now been subsumed into Curcuma, with some species now included in other genera.

- Hitchenia careyana Benth. in G.Bentham & J.D.Hooker = Larsenianthus careyanus (Benth.) W.J.Kress & Mood
- Hitchenia caulina (J.Graham) Baker = Curcuma caulina J.Graham
- Hitchenia musacea Baker = Stachyphrynium latifolium (Blume) K.Schum.
- Hitchenia roscoeana (Wall.) Benth. & Hook.f. = Curcuma roscoeana Wall.

Curcuma and Larsenianthus are in the family Zingiberaceae, but Stachyphrynium is in Marantaceae.
