= Larsenianthus wardianus =

Scientific classification
- Kingdom: Plantae
- Clade: Tracheophytes
- Clade: Angiosperms
- Clade: Monocots
- Clade: Commelinids
- Order: Zingiberales
- Family: Zingiberaceae
- Genus: Larsenianthus
- Species: L. wardianus

Binomial name
- Larsenianthus wardianus W.J.Kress, Thet Htun & Bordelon

Species of plant

Larsenianthus wardianus is a monocotyledonous plant species described by W. J. Kress, Thet Htun, and Bordelon. Larsenianthus wardianus is part of the genus Larsenianthus and the family Zingiberaceae. No subspecies are listed in the Catalog of Life.
