= Larsenianthus arunachalensis =

Conservation status
- Critically Endangered (IUCN 3.1)

Scientific classification
- Kingdom: Plantae
- Clade: Tracheophytes
- Clade: Angiosperms
- Clade: Monocots
- Clade: Commelinids
- Order: Zingiberales
- Family: Zingiberaceae
- Genus: Larsenianthus
- Species: L. arunachalensis

Binomial name
- Larsenianthus arunachalensis M. Sabu, Sanoj & T.Rajesh Kumar

Species of plant

Larsenianthus arunachalensis is a species of the genus Larsenianthus in the ginger family (Zingiberaceae).. It was first described in 2010 and is native to northeastern India, and Myanmar.

== Description ==
=== Vegetative characteristics ===
Larsenianthus arunachalensis grows as an evergreen, perennial herbaceous plant that can reach heights of up to 1.5 meters. The hard, fibrous rhizomes give off a light scent, are up to 1.9 centimeters thick and have a pale brown colored interior. Larsenianthus arunachalensis does not form tubers . The upright, leafy stems have a diameter of 2.5 to 3 centimeters and two leaves at their base.

At the base the stems have four to six red and green colored leaf sheaths, which are slightly hairy towards the tip. With a length of 9.5 to 14 centimeters and a width of 2.4 to 2.7 centimeters, the lanceolate-shaped ligules are hairy on their underside. They dry out over time and then turn brown. The leaves are divided into petiole and leaf blade. The green and hairy petiole becomes 19.5 to 31 centimeters long and has a U-shaped cross section. The simple leaf blade is elliptical with a length of 56 to 88 centimeters and a width of 19 to 25 centimeters with a pointed and slightly twisted upper end. The slightly white colored leaf margins are whole and wavy. The dark green upper side of the leaf is bare. The dull green underside of the leaf is slightly hairy in silver and has raised leaf veins.

=== Generative characteristics ===
The inflorescence grows upright at the tip of leafy stems and can reach a total length of up to 90 centimeters. The upper part of the inflorescence stem is pale green, hairy, between 25 and 75 centimeters long and about 1.2 centimeters thick. The annual inflorescence has a height of 14 to 19 centimeters and a diameter of 3 to 3.4 centimeters. Each inflorescence, 60 to 80, dark red, at the base of white-colored bracts formed, which are spherical to broad-elliptical, boat-shaped with a length of 2.4 to 2.9 centimeters and a width of 2.6 to 2.8 centimeters. They are leathery, hairy, entire and the tip is densely covered with brown hair. There are two to four flowers above each bract, with two to eight flowers of the inflorescence usually opening at the same time. The tubular bracts are between 2.8 and 3.3 centimeters long, are dark red in color and have a white base. On one side they are cut about 1 centimeter deep. Their upper end is pointed or rounded and is densely covered with short, brown hair.

The showy flowers are hermaphroditic and threefold. The three membranous, translucent sepals are fused together to form a calyx tube that is 1.6 to 1.7 centimeters long and about 0.3 centimeters in diameter and is white in the lower area, otherwise light red. The calyx tube is cut 5 to 6 millimeters deep on one side and is hairy, with the hair becoming thicker towards the tip. There are three calyx lobes. The red petalsare fused into a corolla tube that is 3.2 to 3.3 centimeters long and about 3.5 millimeters in diameter at the top. The three corolla lobes are obverse-lanceolate with a length of 1.5 to 1.7 centimeters. The upper corolla lobe is slightly downy on the inside with single-celled, branched trichomes hairy and bent back. The two lateral corolla lobes are hairless. The white and pale red tinted lateral staminodes are circular to broadly elliptical and curved back with a length of about 4 millimeters and a diameter of about 3.5 millimeters. Orange yellow and the top at the tip, beak-like end towards the base red to yellow creamy Labellum with a length of 2.5 to 2.8 centimeters and a width of 2.5 to 3 millimeters, it is narrowly elongated in the lower two thirds and obverse-lanceolate in the upper third, all in all almost spatulate. The fertile stamens, arched like a fish hook, have stamens 2.4 to 2.6 centimeters long, which are colored red in the lower part and creamy yellow in the upper part. The creamy yellow, bald anthers are about 3 millimeters long and about 2 millimeters wide. Three carpels form a three-chamber ovaryfused, which has a length of about 3 millimeters and a diameter of about 2.5 millimeters and is tomentose and light red. There are two white, epigyne glands that are elongated 2.5 to 3 millimeters in length. The white scar is about 0.5 mm in diameter, bulbous with ciliate edges. Its flowering period is between the months of September to October.

The authors of the first description are not aware of the fruits and seeds.

== Range ==
Larsenianthus arunachalensis is known from the place where the type specimen was found on Lohit, near Lalpani, in the state of Arunachal Pradesh in northeast India. It thrives on sandy soils at altitudes of over 1400 meters. One finds Larsenianthus arunachalensis in dense stands of wild occurring banana ( Musa spp.). It has also been found in Northwestern Myanmar, in the Htamanthi Wildlife Sanctuary.

== Taxonomy ==
It was first described as Larsenianthus arunachalensis in 2010 by Mamiyil Sabu, E. Sanoj, and T. Rajesh Kumar in PhytoKeys number 1, page 28. The specific epithet arunachalensis refers to the Indian state of Arunachal Pradesh, in which the type material was found.
