= Larsenianthus assamensis =

Scientific classification
- Kingdom: Plantae
- Clade: Tracheophytes
- Clade: Angiosperms
- Clade: Monocots
- Clade: Commelinids
- Order: Zingiberales
- Family: Zingiberaceae
- Genus: Larsenianthus
- Species: L. assamensis

Binomial name
- Larsenianthus assamensis S. Dey, Mood, & S. Choudhury

Species of plant

Larsenianthus assamensis is a species of the genus Larsenianthus in the ginger family (Zingiberaceae). It was first described in 2010 and is native to northeastern India.

== Description ==
Larsenianthus assamensis grows as an evergreen, herbaceous plant that can reach heights of up to 1.44 meters. The fibrous rhizomes have a white colored interior. The species does not form tubers. The leafy shoots are upright or slightly prostrate and are in dense groups of 7 to 17.

Each of the stems thickened at the base has seven to twelve stalked leaves, which are elliptical in shape with a length of 24 to 34 centimeters and a width of 5.4 to 8.5 centimeters. The dark green upper side of the leaf is hairless. The dull green underside of the leaves is tinted blue-green and has a flat central rib. The tip is pointed. The petiole is between 0 and 7 millimeters long. At the base, the stems have three to five light pink leaf sheaths. These turn brown as they dry out and fall off. The ligule are about 0.7 centimeters long and about 0.5 centimeters wide. They are lobed twice and have rounded tips.

The stalked inflorescence is formed as a winding thyrsus at the tip of leafy shoots and can reach a total length of up to 14 centimeters. The light green-brown, hairless stalk is between 3 and 5 centimeters long and 0.3 to 0.5 centimeters thick. It is enclosed by green, red-striped bracts with a tendril-reinforced tip, which can be up to 4.2 centimeters long and 1 centimeter wide. The egg-shaped to elliptical inflorescence is 5.5 to 8.5 centimeters long and 3.8 to 4 centimeters wide. It has about 35 bractswith the top ones being smaller and sterile just like the bottom ones. These have reddish veins and are 2.1 to 2.8 centimeters long and 1 to 1.3 centimeters wide and elongated-egg-shaped. Their edges are ribbed and serrated and their tips are pointed. Each of the bracts has one to four conspicuous individual flowers, usually only one is fertile. In older inflorescences, an adventurous shoot can arise from the lower, sterile bracts. The lanceolate-boat-shaped prophylls are about 2.7centimeters long and about 1.9 centimeters wide, are slightly translucent white and have a red, conical tip.

The flowers have three-lobed, white sepals with a pink tip, which are tubular shaped with a length of 0.8 to 1.4 centimeters and a diameter of about 0.5 centimeters. The reddish pink petals are 1.9 to 2.7 centimeters long and 0.2 to 0.25 centimeters thick. The flower tubes are lobed linear-lanceolate, with the orange-red, recurved lobes about 1.1 to 1.3 centimeters long and about 0.2 centimeters wide and have a darker tip. The light orange colored and provided with transparent dots, egg-shaped staminodes are about 6 millimeters long and about 3 millimeters thick. The light orange labellumbecomes 2.2 to 2.5 centimeters long and at its widest point 0.2 to 0.3 centimeters wide. Thus it is elongated to rectangular in shape and resembles a V in cross-section. It is slightly triple lobed at the purple-white tip, with the two outer lobes being about 1 millimeter long. The fertile, arched stamens are around 1.8 centimeters in size together with the filaments and are greenish purple in the lower part and light whitish orange in the upper part. The anthers are about 3 millimeters long and about 0.5 millimeters wide and carry the white pollen. Each flower has two unevenly linear, dark purple ovaries, which can be 2 to 3 millimeters long and around 0.5 millimeters thick. The between 0.8 and 0.9 centimeters long and 0.4 to 0.45 centimeters thick, elongated to elliptical shaped, white capsule fruits have a row of seeds in each half of the capsule, which are divided into a total of three separate chambers. Each fruit bears one to four light to dark purple seeds, which are around 3 millimeters long and about 2 millimeters thick. Each seed is surrounded by a thin shell ( aril ).

== Range ==
Larsenianthus assamensis has so far only been found at two locations in Cachar, a district of the state of Assam in northeast India. The species thrives at altitudes of 25 to 150 meters. The annual rainfall is between 3500 and 4000 mm, depending on the location. It grows mainly in the undergrowth of tropical, semi-evergreen forests, where it is mainly found along rivers. In the forests it often grows together with Albizzia, Ampelocissus, Begonia ( Begonia ), Curculigo, Dysoxylum, Laportea, Bananas ( Musa), Uncaria and various ferns.

== Taxonomy ==
It was first described as Larsenianthus assamensis in 2010 by Santanu Dey, John Donald Mood, and Suptotthita Choudhury in PhytoKeys number 1, page 26. The specific epithet assamensis is reminiscent of the Indian state of Assam, where the species is endemic.
