= Navia aliciae =

Scientific classification
- Kingdom: Plantae
- Clade: Tracheophytes
- Clade: Angiosperms
- Clade: Monocots
- Clade: Commelinids
- Order: Poales
- Family: Bromeliaceae
- Genus: Navia
- Species: N. aliciae

Binomial name
- Navia aliciae L.B.Sm., Steyerm. & H.Rob.

Species of flowering plant

Navia aliciae is a species of plant in the genus Navia. This species is endemic to Venezuela. It was first described by Lyman B. Smith and Harold Robinson.

It is named after the botanical artist Alice Tangerini.
