= Technical illustration =

Process of visually communicating technical concepts or subjects

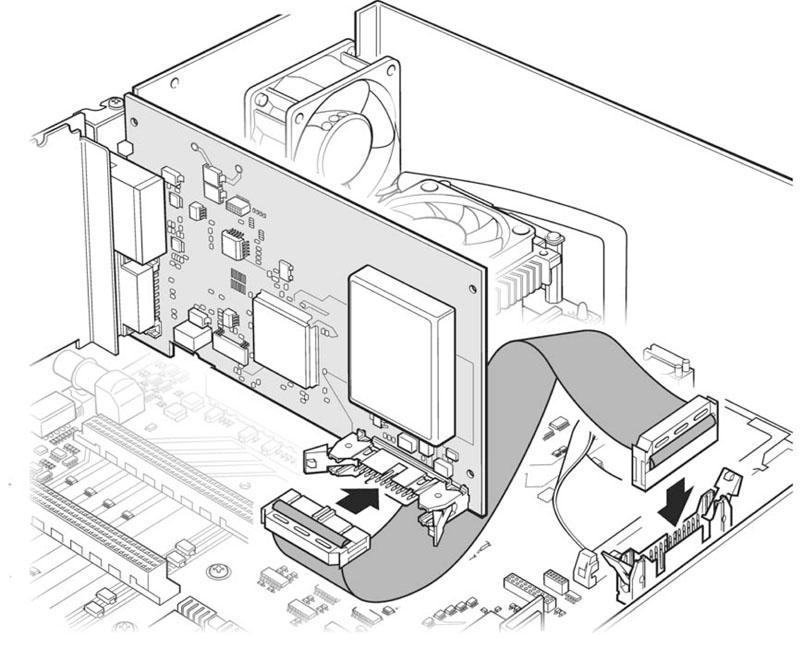
Isometric technical illustration of an interface card conveying placement of the interface cable.

Technical illustration is illustration meant to visually communicate information of a technical nature. Technical illustrations can be components of technical drawings or diagrams. Technical illustrations in general aim "to generate expressive images that effectively convey certain information via the visual channel to the human observer".

Technical illustrations generally have to describe and explain the subjects to a nontechnical audience. Therefore, the visual image should be accurate in terms of dimensions and proportions, and should provide "an overall impression of what an object is or does, to enhance the viewer’s interest and understanding".

== Types ==
=== Types of communication ===
Today, technical illustration can be broken down into three categories based on the type of communication:

- Communication with the general public: informs the general public, for example illustrated instructions found in the manuals for automobiles and consumer electronics. This type of technical illustration contains simple terminology and symbols that can be understood by the lay person and is sometimes called creative technical illustration/graphics.
- Specialized engineering or scientific communication: used by engineers/scientists to communicate with their peers and in specifications. This use of technical illustration has its own complex terminology and specialized symbols; examples are the fields of atomic energy, aerospace and military/defense. These areas can be further broken down into disciplines of mechanical, electrical, architectural engineering and many more
- To help manufacture or replicate an invention
- Communication between highly skilled experts: used by engineers to communicate with people who are highly skilled in a field, but who are not engineers. Examples of this type of technical illustration are illustrations found in user/operator documentation. These illustrations can be very complex and have jargon and symbols not understood by the general public, such as illustrations that are part of instructional materials for operating CNC machinery.

=== Types of drawings ===
Main types of drawings in technical communication are:

- conventional line drawings,
- exploded-view drawings,
- cutaway drawings, and
- clip art images

== Techniques ==
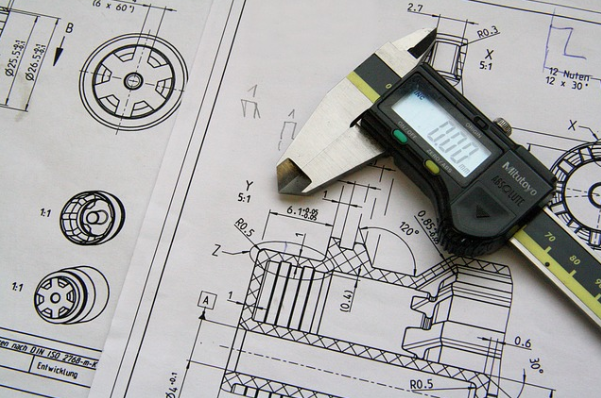

Technical illustration uses several basic mechanical drawing configurations called axonometric projection. These are:

- Parallel projections (oblique, planometric, isometric, dimetric, and trimetric), and
- many types of perspective projections (with one, two, or three vanishing points).

Technical illustration and computer-aided design can also use 3D and solid-body projections, such as rapid prototyping.

- In the natural sciences, "scientific illustration" refers to a style of drawing using stippling and simple line techniques to convey information with a minimum of artistic interpretation.

== Examples ==
Technical Illustrations Gallery
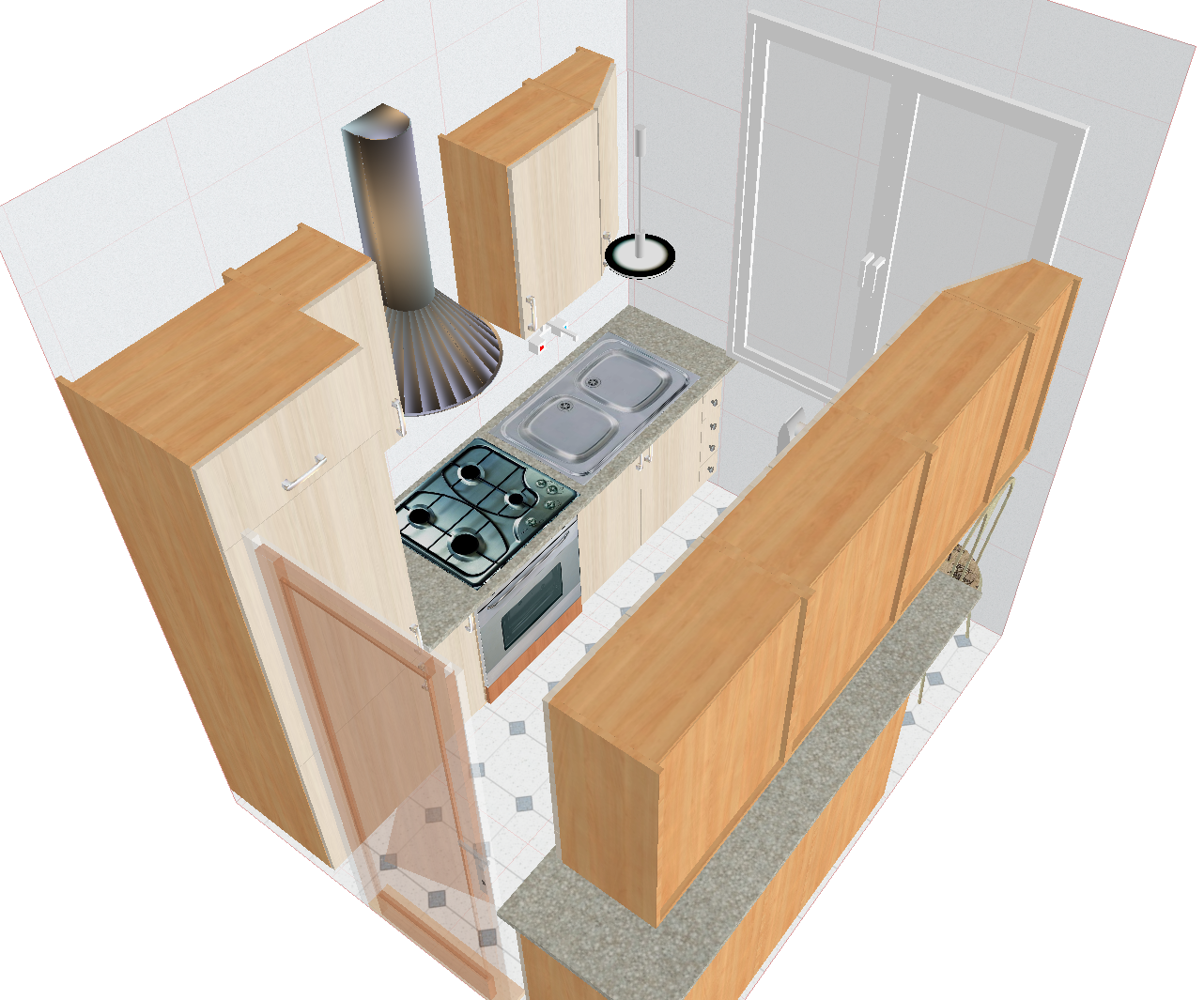
Small kitchen in perspective

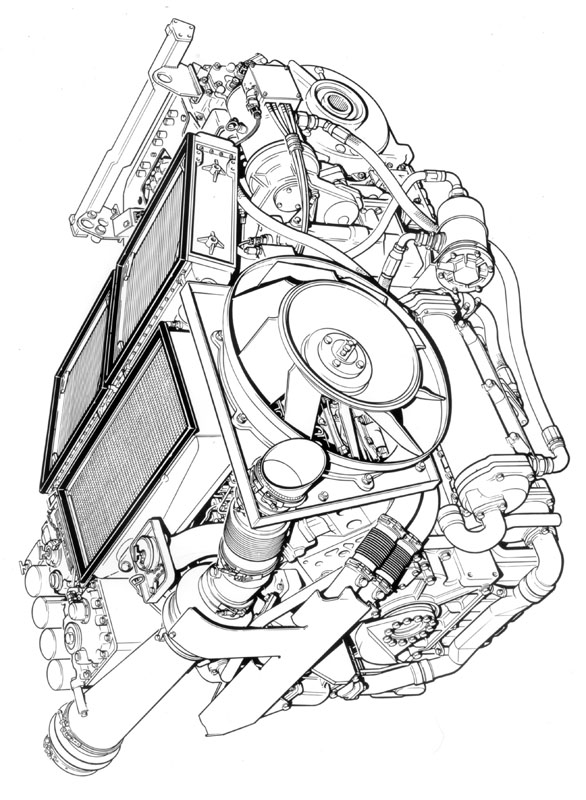
Conventional line illustration of an engine demonstrating perspective and line techniques

Illustration of a drum set

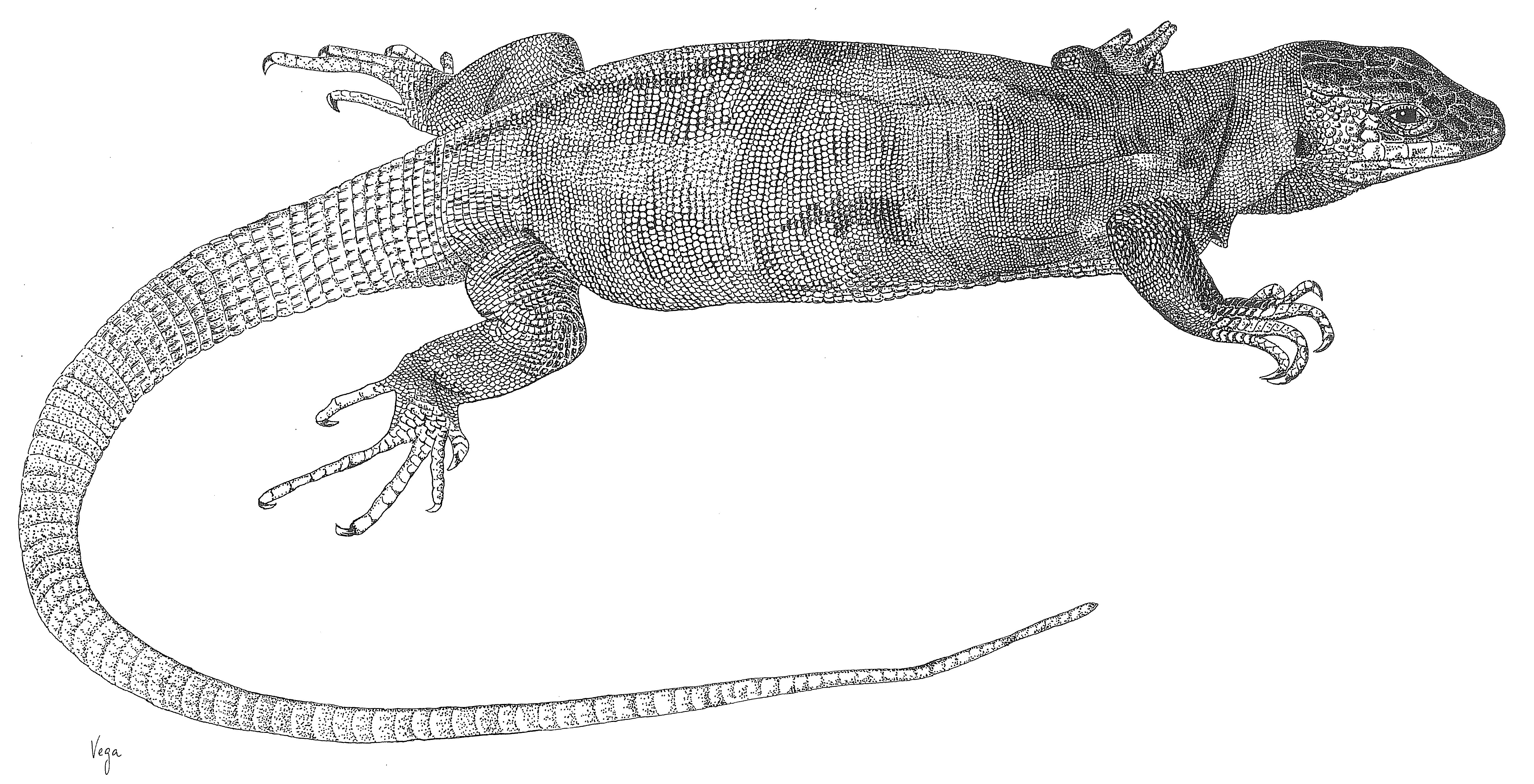
Gallotia simonyi, example of pen and ink scientific illustration

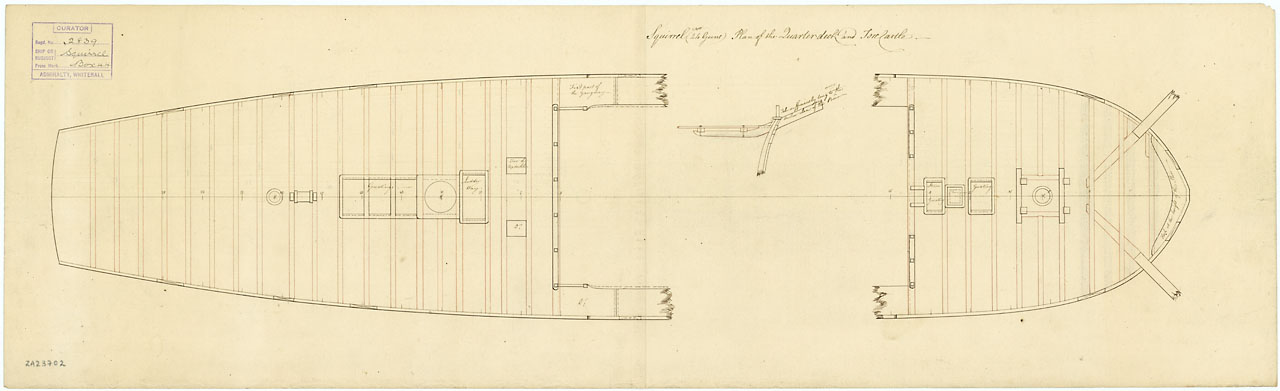
Broken view plan, showing the decks of a ship, drawn 1783

== See also ==
- Archaeological illustration
- Association of Medical Illustrators
- Biological illustration
- Guild of Natural Science Illustrators
- Illustrator
- Information graphics
- Information visualisation
- Medical illustration
- Technical communications
- Technical drawing
