= Jen Christiansen =

American author, data illustrator, and graphics editor

Jen Christiansen is an American author, data illustrator, and a senior graphics editor for Scientific American. She has published many books on her work which include her insight on collaboration and the visualization spectrum.

== Education ==
Christiansen earned an undergraduate degree in Geology and Studio Art at Smith College. Afterwards, she continued her education at a one-year natural science illustration graduate program at the University of California Santa Cruz.

== Work ==
Ed Bell (director of Scientific American) met Christiansen on a visit he took to the University of California, Santa Cruz's program.

In 1996, Christiansen took an internship at the Scientific American in which she learned about publishing for about 8 months.

Directly after her internship, Christiansen was placed as the assistant art director for about 2 years.

Afterwards, Christiansen moved to Washington DC to become the assistant art director at National Geographic in 1998 for a few years.

For the following 4 years, Christiansen then took on freelancing as a science communicator where she often took on work for the Scientific American.

She returned to the Scientific American in 2007 where she now focuses on print and large features as the senior graphics editor. She also reviews the magazines text and determines how to translate it into visuals while also critiquing the text from time to time.

== Bibliography ==
- Plenary "Visualizing Science: Illustration and Beyond" at the Guild of Natural Science Illustrators 2018 conference.
- Covering Art in Scientific American
- Visualizing Uncertain Weather
- Flooding Up Close
- Stefaner, Moritz; Lorraine Daston & Jen Christiansen (September 2020). "The language of science". 175 Years of Discovery. Scientific American. 323 (3): 24–31. doi:10.1038/scientificamerican0920-26. PMID 39014682.
- Christiansen, Jen (September 2020). "Pulsar as pop icon". Graphic Science. Scientific American. 323 (3). Graphic by Harold D. Craft, Jr.: 84.
