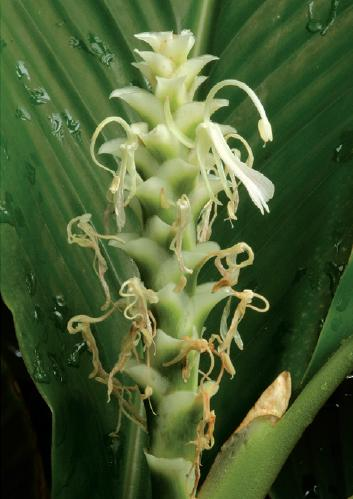

Scientific classification
- Kingdom: Plantae
- Clade: Tracheophytes
- Clade: Angiosperms
- Clade: Monocots
- Clade: Commelinids
- Order: Zingiberales
- Family: Zingiberaceae
- Genus: Larsenianthus
- Species: L. careyanus

Binomial name
- Larsenianthus careyanus (Benth. & Hook.f.) W.J.Kress & Mood

Synonyms
- Hitchenia careyana Benth. & Hook.f.

= Larsenianthus careyanus =

Species of plant

Larsenianthus careyanus is a species of the ginger family (Zingiberaceae). It occurs in Bangladesh as well as northeast India. It is the type species of the genus Larsenianthus, which was newly established in 2010.

== Description ==
Larsenianthus careyanus grows as an evergreen, herbaceous plant that can reach heights of up to 2.15 meters. The fibrous rhizomes are fragrant and reach a diameter of about 2.5 centimeters. The yellow roots are up to 5 millimeters thick. No tubers are formed. The leafy shoots 3 to 4 centimeters thick at the base are in dense groups of ten to thirty.

Each stem has seven to nine stalked or sessile leaves, which are ovate to elliptical in shape with a length of 36 to 60 centimeters and a width of 18 to 19 centimeters. The petiole becomes up to 2 millimeters long. The glossy, dark green, hairless upper side of the leaf shows conspicuous, protruding leaf veins . The hairless underside of the leaf is blunt, green in color and has a slightly hairy central rib. The leaf margins are translucent or ciliate, while the base of the leaf - just like the tip - is pointed. At the base, the stems have three glossy dark green and sparsely hairy leaf sheaths, which turn brown over time. The semi-transparent ones, initially green, later brownLigules are densely hairy and are 7 to 8 centimeters long and around 4 centimeters wide. Their tip is rounded or truncated.

The stalked inflorescence is formed as a coiled thyrsus at the tip of leafy shoots and can reach a total length of up to 35 centimeters. The light yellowish-green, hairless stalk is 11 to 12 centimeters long and 1.2 to 1.8 centimeters thick. It is enveloped by the top two leaves. The cylindrically shaped inflorescence becomes 22 to 25 centimeters long and 6 to 7 centimeters wide. It has up to 60 bractswith a curved tip, the lowest three to four being sterile. These are colored green and have a wide, white corner and are egg-shaped with a length of around 3.5 and a width of around 3 centimeters. They are also covered by a sticky slime. Each of the bracts bears four to six individual flowers. In older inflorescences, one to three apomictically generated shoots can arise from the sterile bracts . The striped, light brown-yellowish prophylls are 2.5 to 2.8 centimeters long and 0.5 to 1.5 centimeters wide and are boat-shaped to lanceolate and have a truncated to pointed tip. The lower flowers always open first.

The flowers have triple-toothed, whitish-transparent sepals, which are tubular in shape with a length of 1 to 1.8 centimeters. The white, tubular petals are 4.5 to 5.2 centimeters long and 0.1 to 0.2 centimeters thick. At its lower end, the flower tube bends towards Rhachis. The flower tubes have three greenish-white lobes with pink tips, which are about 1.5 centimeters long and about 1 centimeter wide and are linear-lanceolate in shape. The posterior lobes are bent 180 ° against the flower tube, while the anterior ones are twisted and bent downwards and are almost parallel to the labellum. The lateral ones, colored white and almost spherical. Staminodes are about 2 millimeters long and about 2 millimeters thick and are bent back. Its pink, hairless tip is trimmed. The elongated, white to light purple-pink labellum is around 2.4 centimeters long and around 0.6 centimeters wide at its widest point and is thus shaped like an inverted lanceolate. Its surface is shiny; it has a trimmed tip as well as a bidentate base. The white, fertile stamens are about 2.3 centimeters long together with the filaments, are arranged in an arc and end about 1 centimeter above the labellum. The anthers are elongated with a length of about 5 millimeters and a thickness of about 3 millimeters and carry the white pollen. Each flower has two yellow, wedge shaped with a length of 5 millimeters and a thickness of 1 mm and draft tube ovary. The approximately 2 centimeter long and 1 centimeter thick capsule fruits have a row of seeds in each half of the capsule, which are divided into three separate chambers. Each fruit bears eight to ten, shiny green seeds, which are about 5 millimeters long and about 3 millimeters thick. Each seed is surrounded by a thin shell (aril).

== Range ==
The natural range of Larsenianthus careyanus includes Bangladesh and the states of Arunachal Pradesh, Assam, Manipur, and Meghalaya in northeast India. They are found there in tropical forests.

== Taxonomy ==
The first description as Hitchenia careyana was made in 1883 by George Bentham in Genera Plantarum 3 S. 643. In 2010, she was in phytokeys No. 1, pp. 21, (23) by Walter John Emil Kress and John Donald Mood as Larsenianthus careyanus is assigned to the newly established genus Larsenianthus as a type species. The specific epithet careyanus honors the English missionary and botanist William Carey.
