= Bahiana (plant) =

Scientific classification
- Kingdom: Plantae
- Clade: Tracheophytes
- Clade: Angiosperms
- Clade: Eudicots
- Clade: Rosids
- Order: Malpighiales
- Family: Euphorbiaceae
- Subfamily: Acalyphoideae
- Tribe: Bernardieae
- Genus: Bahiana; J.F.Carrión

Species
- Bahiana occidentalis K.Wurdack; Bahiana pyriformis J.F.Carrión

Genus of flowering plants

Bahiana is a genus of flowering plants in the family Euphorbiaceae. It includes two species native to tropical South America.

- Bahiana occidentalis K.Wurdack – northern Peru
- Bahiana pyriformis J.F.Carrión – Bahia state of northeastern Brazil.

The genus was described by Juan F. Carrión in 2022.
