= Association of North American Graduate Programs in the Conservation of Cultural Property =

Professional conservation organization

- Established: 1984
- Type: Professional conservation association
- Region served: North America
- Website: resources.culturalheritage.org/anagpic-student-papers/

The Association of North American Graduate Programs in the Conservation of Cultural Property, better known by its acronym ANAGPIC, is an annual student conference held by the North American conservation graduate programs.

It is often hosted by one member of the graduate program, and features a day of talks by senior conservators and allied professionals. The talks address a selected theme of current interest in conservation.

== History ==
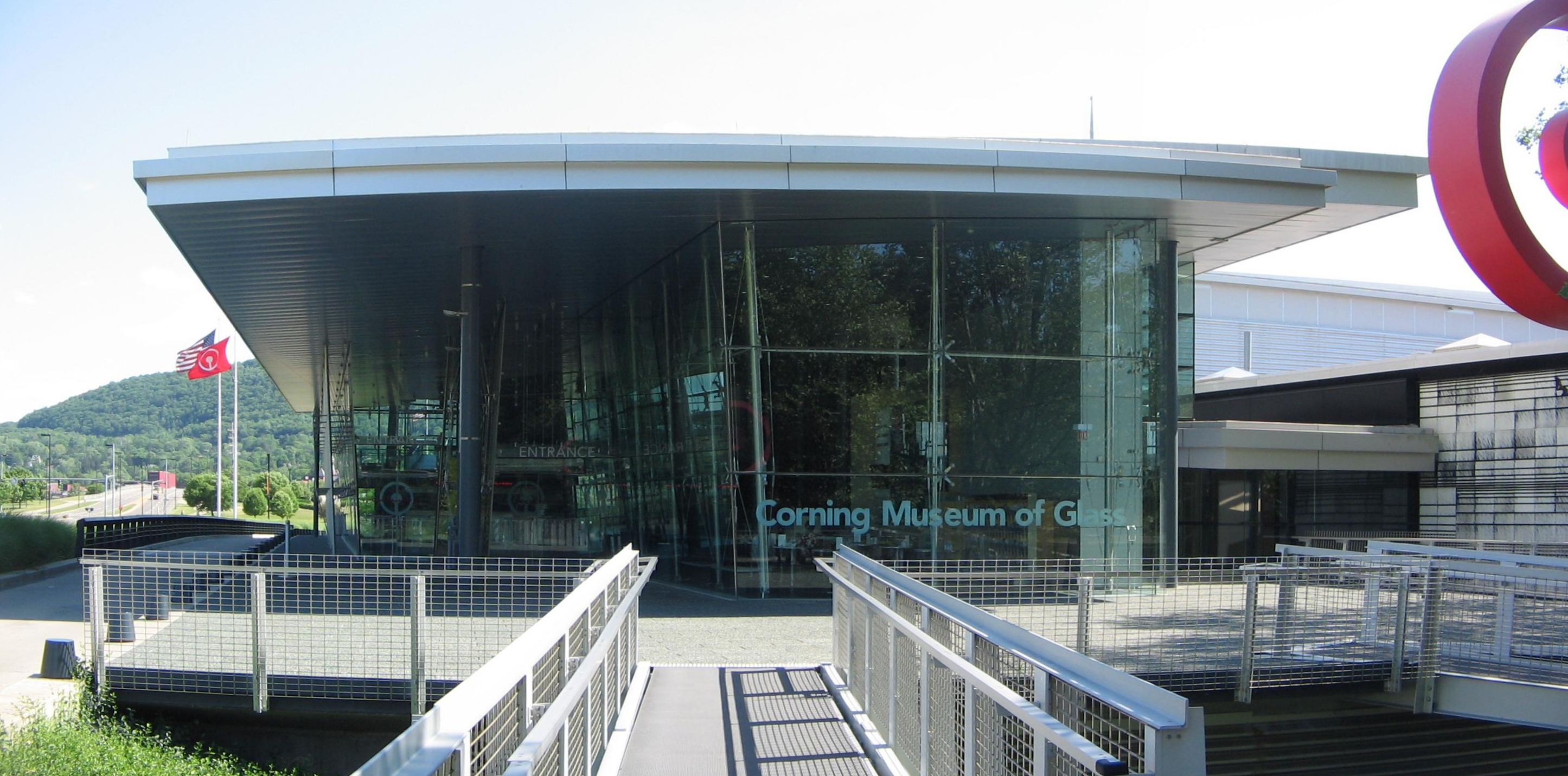
The Corning Museum of Glass, site of the first conference held by the North American graduate programs in conservation

The first conference of North American graduate programs in the conservation of art and other cultural property was held in 1974 at the Corning Museum of Glass in response to a flood that damaged the museum's artifact and library collection on June 23, 1972. While only four percent (528 objects) of the museum's glass collection sustained damage, seventy-nine percent of the museum's library holdings were lost or severely devastated. This five-day conference entitled, "Conservation Seminar on Glass and Library Materials," was organized by Dr. Robert H. Brill, the Corning Museum's research scientist. Five American programs and a contingent from the Canadian Conservation Institute were in attendance; Cooperstown Graduate Program, Winterthur/University of Delaware, Intermuseum Conservation Association, New York University, Canadian Conservation Institute, and the Fogg Art Museum.

The Association of North American Graduate Programs in the Conservation of Cultural Property (ANAGPIC) was founded in May, 1984 by the following organizations: Buffalo State College, State University of New York, Art Conservation Department; Harvard University Art Museums, Straus Center for Conservation and Technical Studies; New York University, Conservation Center, Institute of Fine Arts; Queen's University, Art Conservation Program; Winterthur/University of Delaware Program in Art Conservation; The University of Texas at Austin, School of Information, Kilgarlin Center for Preservation of the Cultural Record.

== Membership ==
In order for organizations to be eligible for membership, they must have provided conservation training for at least three consecutive years and they must award a diploma, degree, or certificate formally acknowledged by their parent academic association. The student to faculty ratio must also be no greater than ten students per faculty member, and these faculty members must have professional qualifications to teach conservation at a graduate level.

At least one meeting of the ANAGPIC is held annually, normally concurrent with the annual Conference of the Conservation Training Programs, at present in late spring. Typically, each institution is represented by two student presenters. Other meetings can be called as necessary if agreed to by at least two-thirds of the membership. Each member organization is normally represented by the training program director/chairperson. Due to a pandemic the 2020 ANAGPIC Conference, which was to be held in Buffalo, NY, was cancelled.

== Current members ==
=== Buffalo State College, SUNY, Art Conservation Department ===
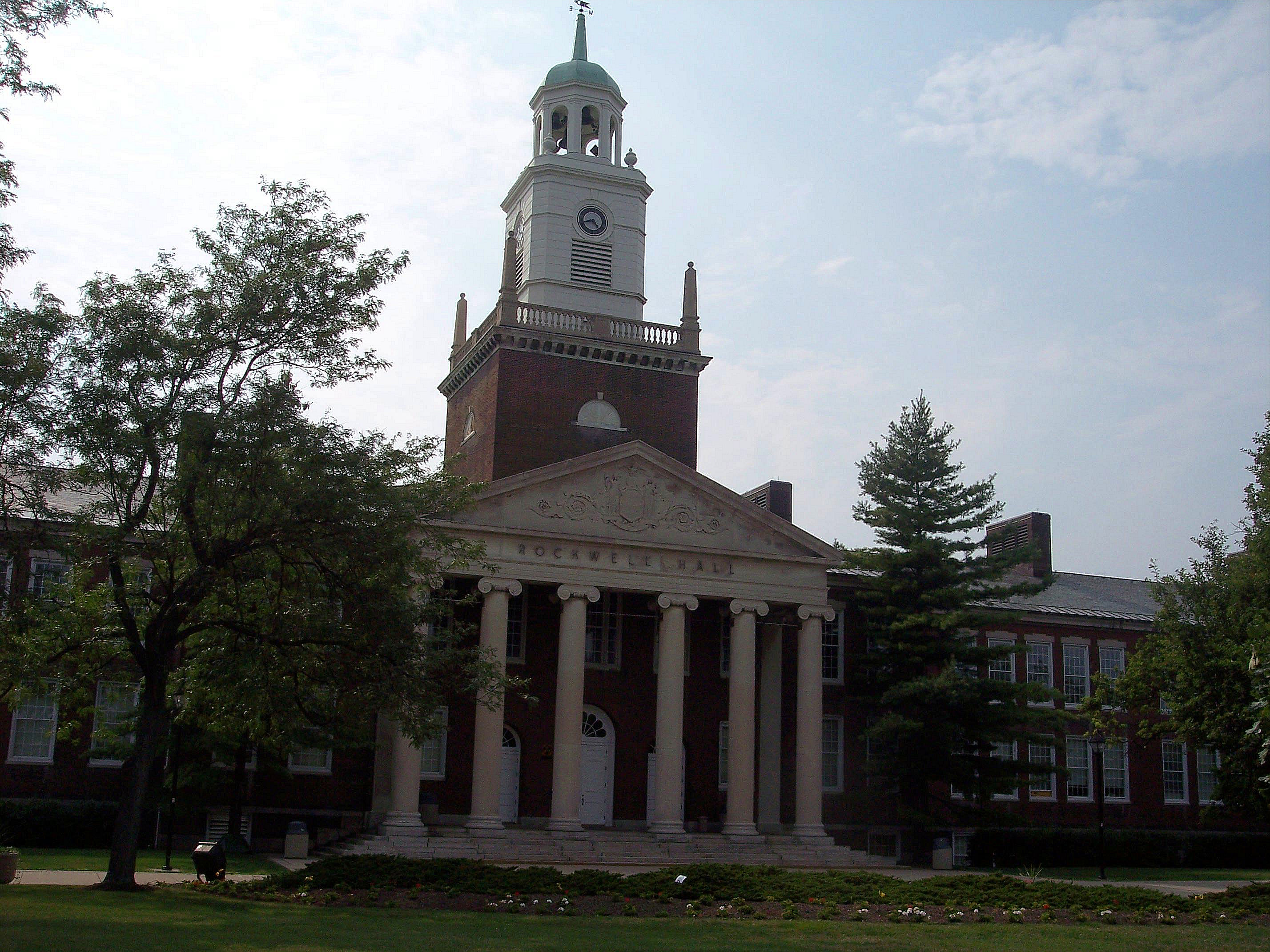
Rockwell Hall at Buffalo State College, where graduate courses in art conservation are held.

Buffalo State College's Art Conservation Department was founded in 1970 as the Cooperstown Graduate Program in the Conservation of Historic and Artistic Works, affiliated with the State University of New York College at Oneonta and with the New York State Historical Association in Cooperstown. In 1983, the program transferred to Buffalo State College, and then relocated to its campus in 1987. This program accepts 10 students per academic year. Buffalo State is the largest four-year college of arts and sciences in the State University of New York (SUNY) system.

=== Harvard Art Museums, Straus Center for Conservation and Technical Studies ===
The Straus Center for Conservation and Technical Studies provides research, analysis, and treatments for the Harvard Art Museums’ collection. In 1994, the center was renamed the Straus Center for Conservation and Technical Studies in honor of Philip A. and Lynn Straus, who were longtime financers of the Harvard Art Museums. The Straus Center includes the Forbes Pigment Collection and the Gettens Collection of Binding Media and varnishes. It houses over 2,500 pigment samples.

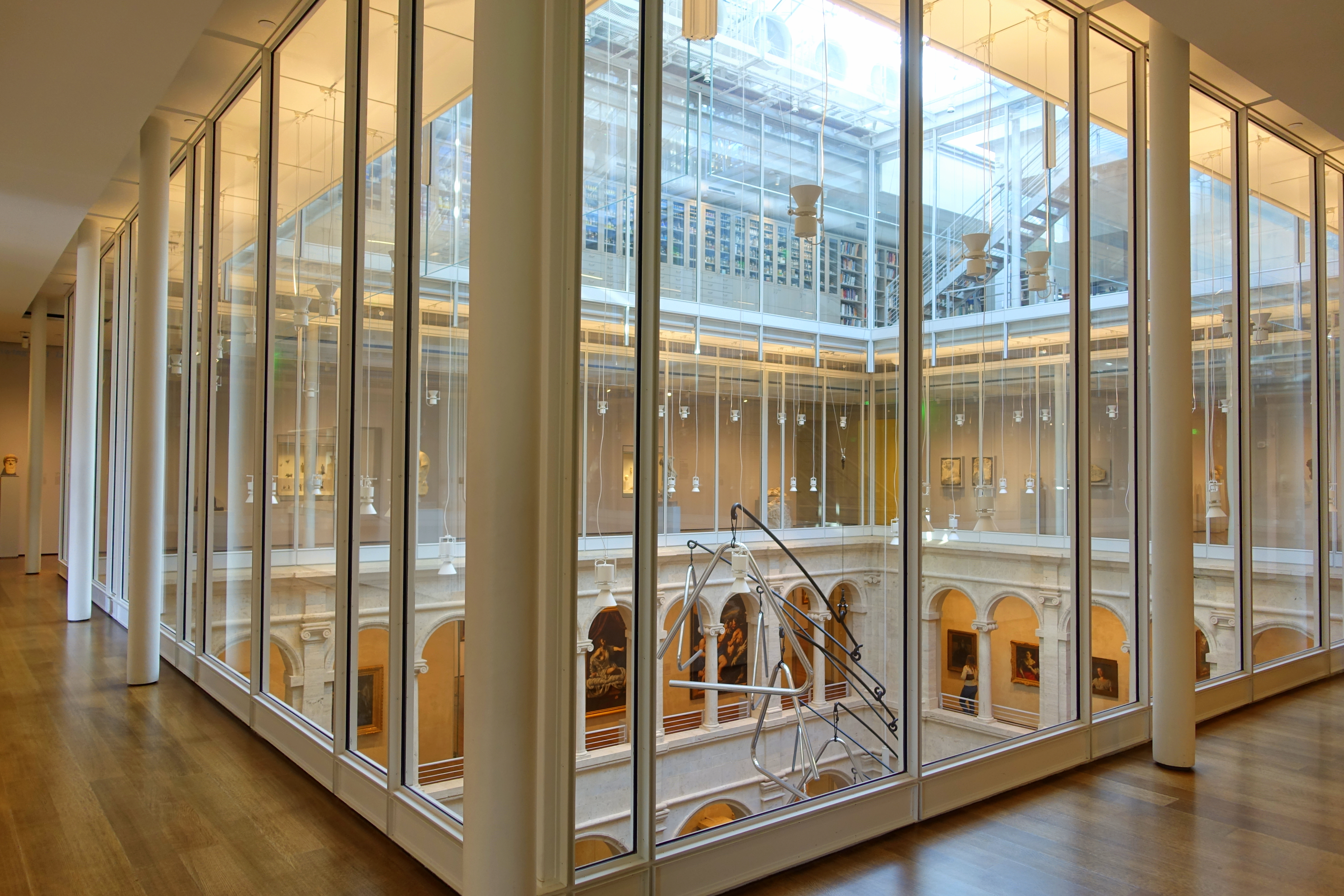
Harvard Art museum

=== New York University, Conservation Center, Institute of Fine Arts ===
The Conservation Center of the Institute of Fine Arts at New York University (NYU) was founded in 1960 with support from the Rockefeller Foundation.

=== Queen’s University, Art Conservation Program ===
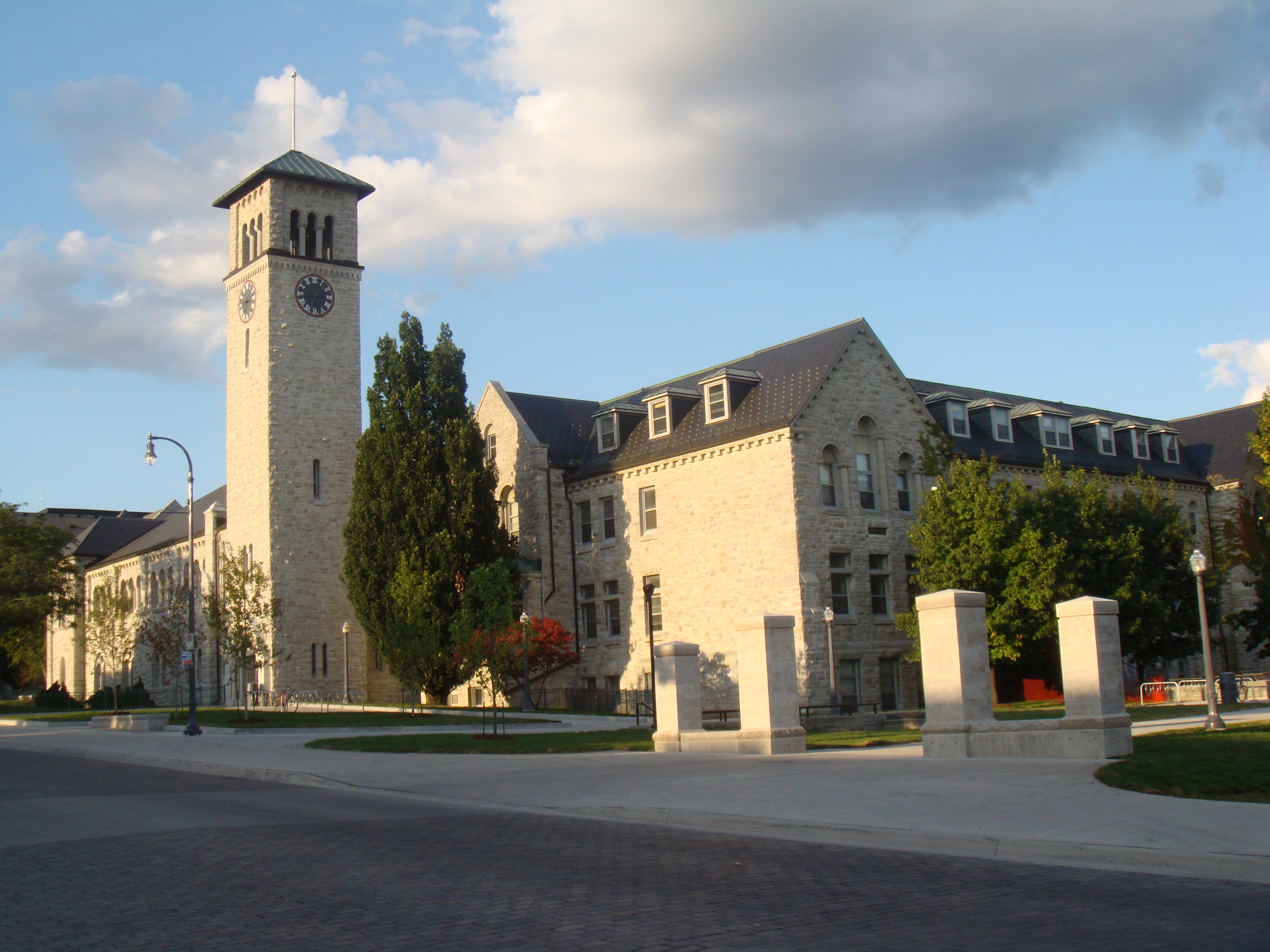
Grant Hall at Queen's University at Kingston; one of the most recognizable landmarks at the university.

The Master of Art Conservation Program (MAC) at Queen's University in Kingston was founded in 1974, and houses the only full-time graduate-level training program in the field of art conservation in Canada.

=== University of California, Los Angeles/Getty ===
In 1999, Getty Conservation Institute and University of California, Los Angeles (UCLA) formally announced their intention to work together in creating a graduate-level program in archaeological and ethnographic conservation. The UCLA/Getty Master's Program on the Conservation of Archaeological and Ethnographic Materials is the only graduate conservation training program on the west coast of the United States, as well as the only program to focus primarily on archeological and ethnographic materials. The program admits students every two years, with an incoming class size between six and twelve students.

=== Winterthur/University of Delaware Program in Art Conservation ===
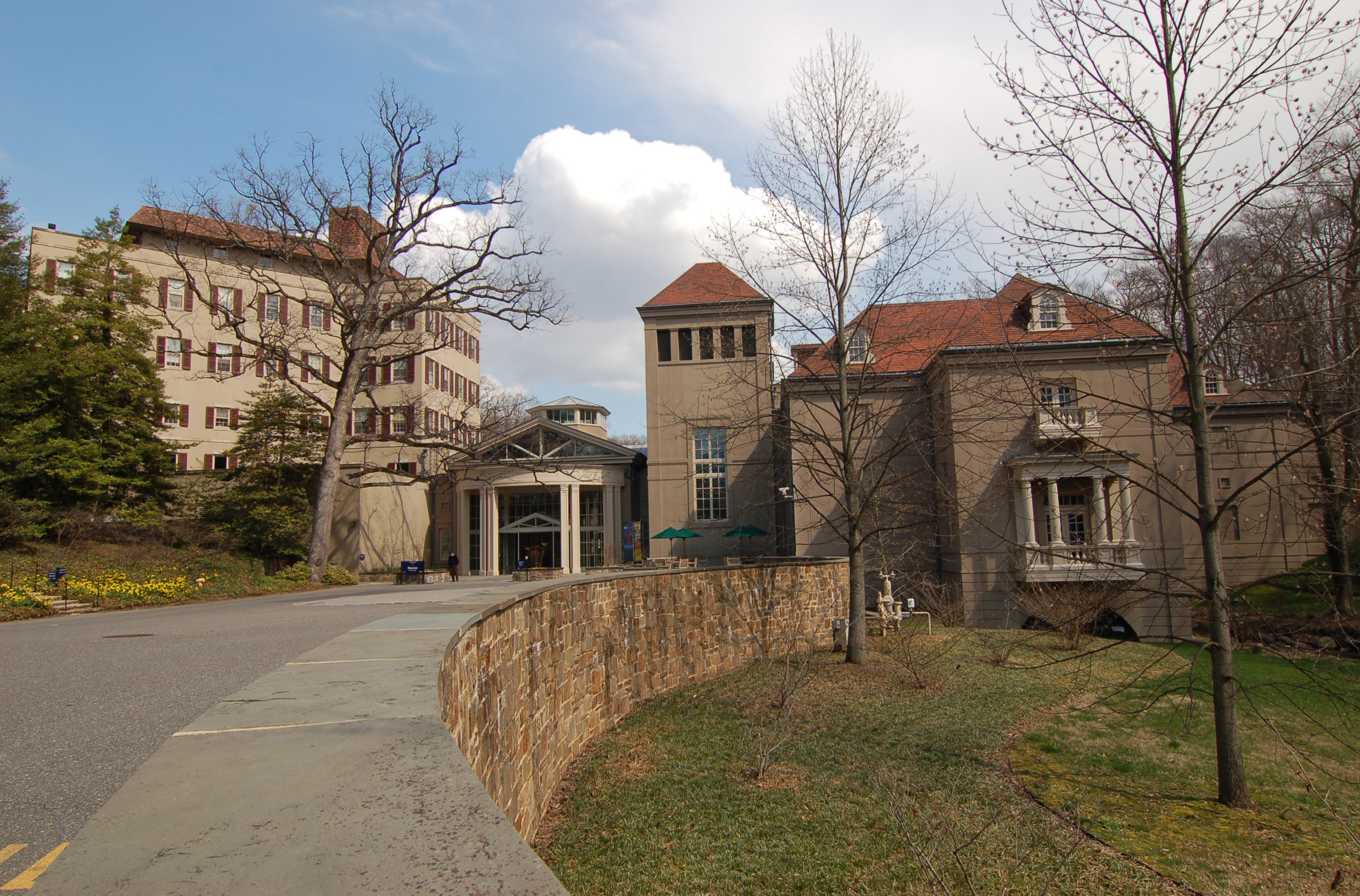
The Winterthur Museum Building in Winterthur, Delaware.

The University of Delaware Art Conservation Department grants preservation degrees at undergraduate, Master's, and PhD levels. In January 1969, the Winterthur Board of Trustees approved the creation of a coordinated program in museum conservation that would utilize Winterthur's conservation laboratories and the science and humanities departments at the University of Delaware.

== See also ==
- Collections care
- Conservation-restoration
- Conservation science
- Conservator-restorer
- Cultural conservation-restoration organizations
- Object conservation
- Preventive conservation

== Sources ==
- Buffalo State College. "ANAGPIC 2014 Buffalo | Art Conservation | Buffalo State." Art Conservation | Buffalo State. https://web.archive.org/web/20140413105908/http://artconservation.buffalostate.edu/students/anagpic-2014-buffalo (accessed April 14, 2014).
- Buffalo State College. "Art Conservation | Buffalo State." Art Conservation | Buffalo State. http://artconservation.buffalostate.edu (accessed April 14, 2014).
- COnservation OnLine. "ANAGPIC 2013 Student Papers & Posters." ANAGPIC 2013 Student Papers & Posters. http://cool.conservation-us.org/anagpic/studentpapers2013.htm (accessed April 14, 2014).
- Harvard University. "Straus Center for Conservation and Technical Studies." Harvard Art Museums. http://www.harvardartmuseums.org/study-research/straus (accessed April 14, 2014).
- New York University, Institute of Fine Arts. "IFA - Conservation Center." IFA - Conservation Center. http://www.nyu.edu/gsas/dept/fineart/conservation/ (accessed April 14, 2014).
- North American Graduate Programs in the conservation of cultural property: histories, alumni. Buffalo, NY: ANAGPIC, 2000.
- Queen's University. "Art History and Art Conservation." Art Conservation. https://web.archive.org/web/20140415152849/http://www.queensu.ca/art/artconservation.html (accessed April 14, 2014).
- University of California, Los Angeles. "Cotsen Institute of Archaeology." Conservation Program. https://web.archive.org/web/20140410211125/http://ioa.ucla.edu/conservation-program/ (accessed April 14, 2014).
- University of Delaware. "Art Conservation at the University of Delaware : Masters." Art Conservation at the University of Delaware. http://www.artcons.udel.edu/masters (accessed April 14, 2014).
- Columbia University. "Columbia GSAPP MS in Historic Preservation." Architectural Conservation at Columbia University. https://www.arch.columbia.edu/programs/7-m-s-historic-preservation (accessed 23 June 2020).
- "Weitzman School of Design: MS in Historic Preservation". Architectural Conservation at the University of Pennsylvania. Archived from the original on February 16, 2019.
