= Effie Kapsalis =

American open access advocate (1971–2022)

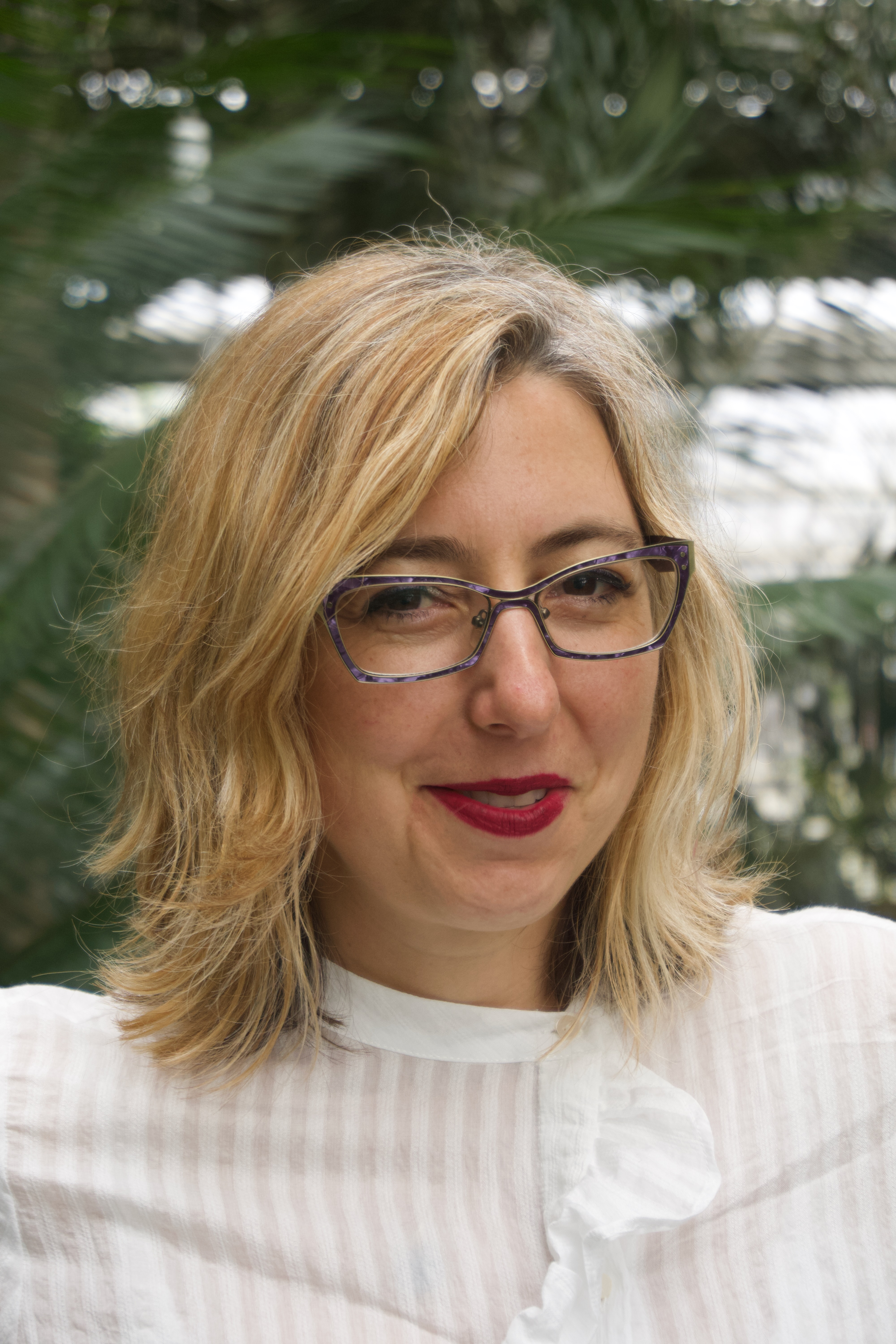
- Kapsalis (2013)
- Born: April 21, 1971; Chicago, Illinois, US
- Died: December 11, 2022 (aged 51); Maryland, US
- Education: Indiana University Bloomington; University of the Arts (Philadelphia)
- Employer: Smithsonian Institution
- Spouse: Andrew Curry (m. 2008)
- Children: 1

Effie Kapsalis (April 21, 1971 – December 11, 2022) was an American open access advocate known for work related to digital programs and initiatives, including those advanced at the Smithsonian Institution.

== Early life ==
Kapsalis was born April 21, 1971, in Chicago, Illinois. She graduated from Indiana University Bloomington with a major in French language and literature. She went on to earn a master's degree from the University of the Arts (Philadelphia) in industrial design and pervasive technology.

== Career ==
As senior digital program officer at the Smithsonian, Kapsalis headed the team responsible for making 2.8 million high-resolution two- and three-dimensional images from the institute's collections openly available online in 2020. In addition, she was in this position for the Smithsonian American Women’s History Initiative, which worked to digitize information about lost stories of girls and women.She worked to make the Smithsonian's archival collections more accessible online and authored a blog series titled Wonderful Women Wednesday. Kapsalis' work was featured on Open Minds...from Creative Commons in 2021.

In 2013, Kapsalis and Sara Snyder were the recipients of the inaugural Distinguished Service Award by the Wikimedia District of Columbia for their work within the Smithsonian Institution, encouraging people to learn how to edit Wikipedia.

In 2016, Kapsalis was part of a South by Southwest (SXSW) panel, 'Give It Away to Get Rich: Open Cultural Heritage', in which she presented her 2016 report 'The Impact of Open Access on Galleries, Libraries, Museums, & Archives'. 'The Impact of Open Access' has been cited by over 40 peer-reviewed publications since then.

Kapsalis married her husband, Andrew Curry, in 2008. The two had a daughter, Melina, in 2011. She died by suicide at her home in Maryland on December 11, 2022, at the age of 51.

== Publications ==
- Kapsalis, Effie (2 January 2019). "Wikidata: Recruiting the Crowd to Power Access to Digital Archives". Journal of Radio & Audio Media. 26 (1): 134–142. doi:10.1080/19376529.2019.1559520. ISSN 1937-6529. S2CID 204370555.
- Kapsalis, Effie (1 June 2016). "Making History with Crowdsourcing". Collections: A Journal for Museum and Archives Professionals. 12 (2): 187–197. doi:10.1177/155019061601200211. S2CID 86499060.
- Kapsalis, Effie (27 April 2016). "The Impact of Open Access on Galleries, Libraries, Museums, & Archives" (PDF). Smithsonian Institution.
- Kapsalis, Effie, et al. (17 September 2009). "Smithsonian Team Flickr: a library, archives, and museums collaboration in web 2.0 space" (PDF). Archive Science. 8 (4):267–277. https://doi.org/10.1007/s10502-009-9089-y. Open access deposit. Retrieved 8 January 2023.
