= S. Dillon Ripley Center =

Museum building in Washington, D.C.

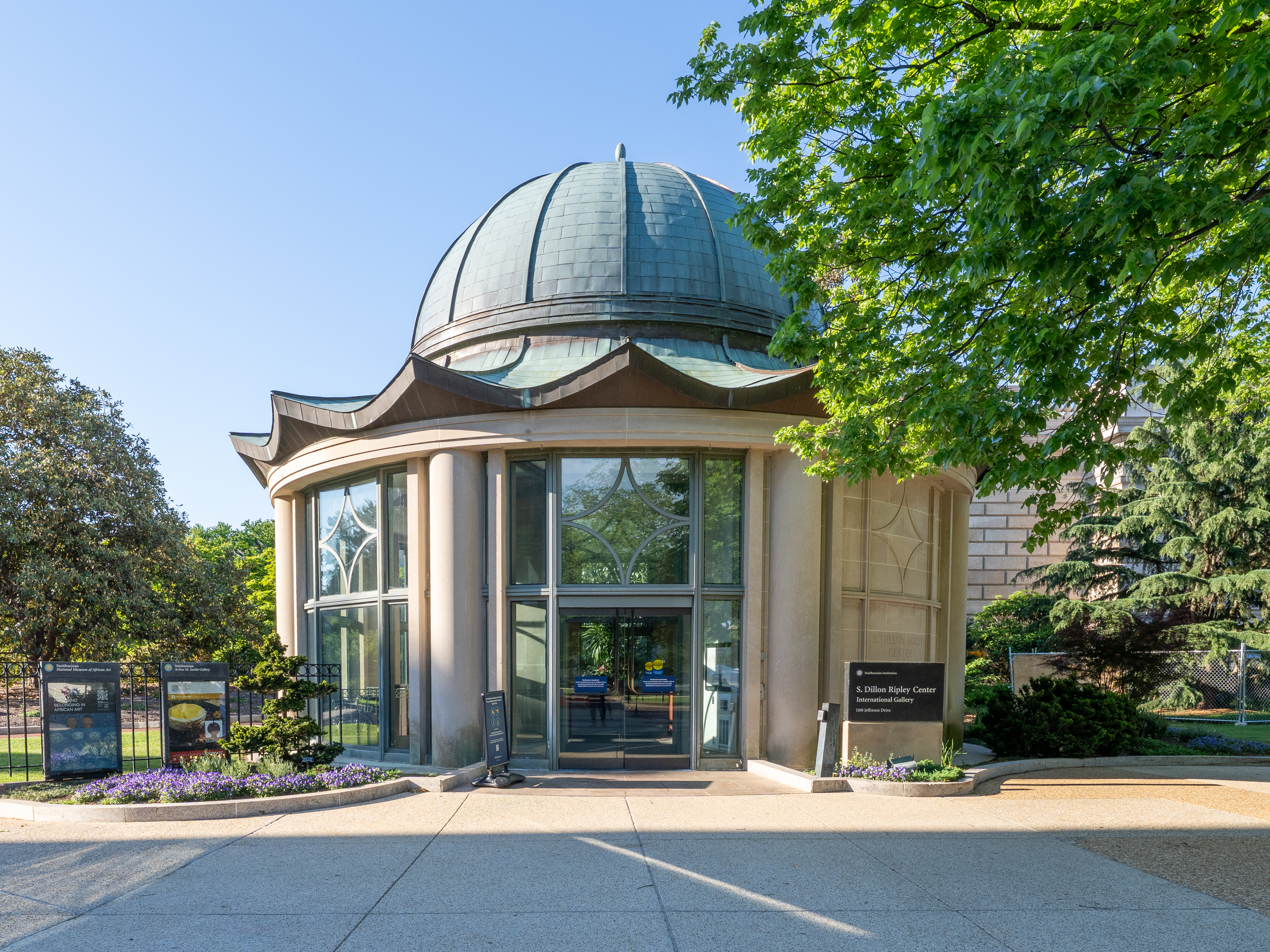
- Entrance kiosk of the Center

- Location within Washington, D.C. S. Dillon Ripley Center (the United States)
- Location: 1100 Jefferson Drive SW, Washington, D.C.
- Coordinates: 38.8886°N 77.0269°W
- Public transit access: Smithsonian
- Website: www.si.edu/Museums/ripley-center

The S. Dillon Ripley Center, better known simply as the Ripley Center, is one of the buildings of the Smithsonian Institution series of museums located in the National Mall in Washington, D.C. The above-ground portion is only a small pagoda, and it descends into a larger underground portion. The Ripley Center houses the International Gallery, The Smithsonian Associates, and the offices of the Smithsonian Contributing Membership. It contains a conference center, an art gallery, and meeting/class rooms as well as exhibition space. It connects underground to the Arthur M. Sackler Gallery, the National Museum of African Art, and the Freer Gallery of Art.

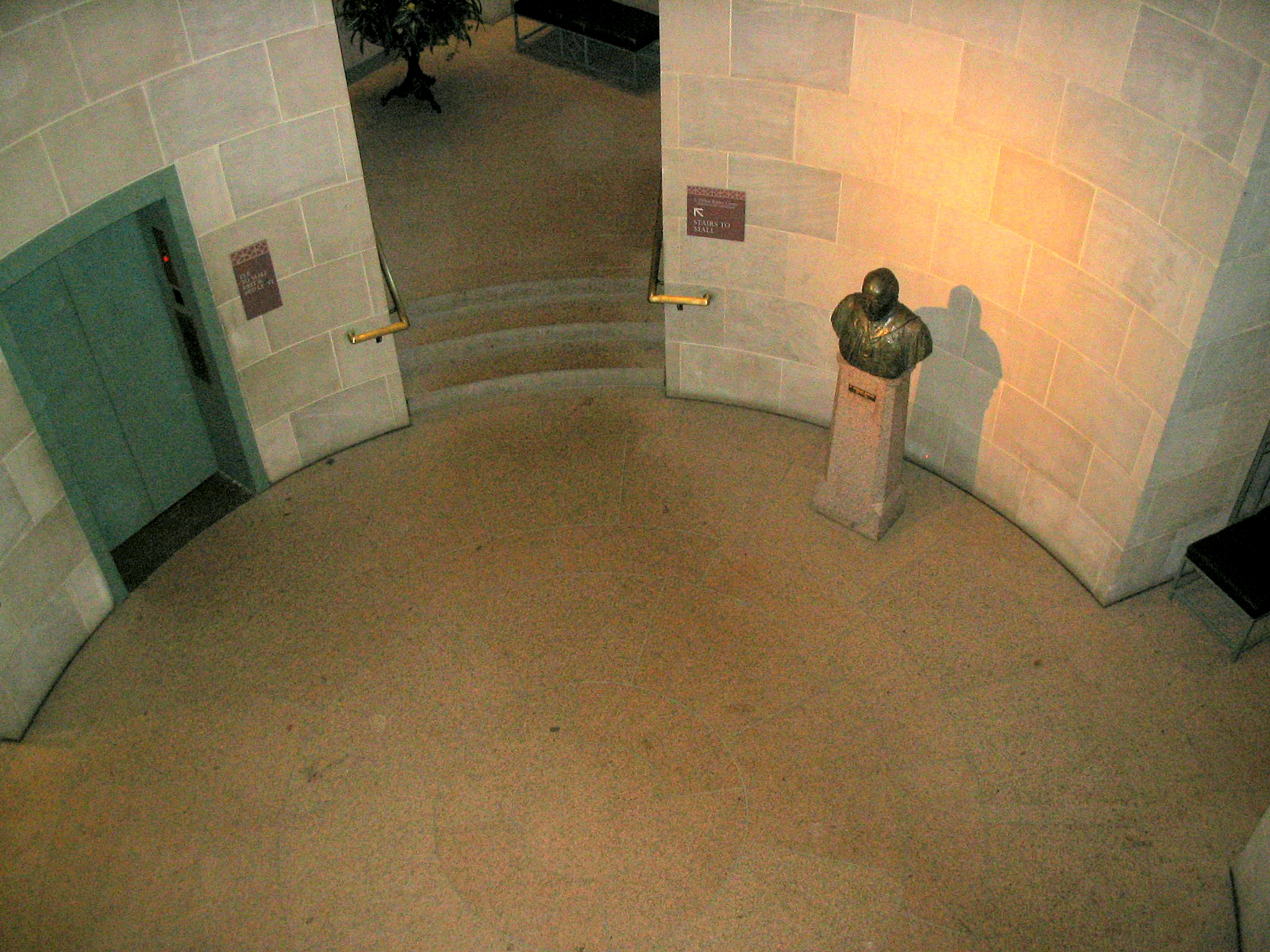
The interior of the museum is a small, round area that descends for several stories.

The Smithsonian Associates was formed in 1992 from combining the Resident Associates Program with the Smithsonian National Associate Program. The Smithsonian Associates was established as the cultural, educational, and membership division of the Smithsonian Institution. These membership and educational programs include the Young Benefactors, Smithsonian Sleepovers, Resident Associates Program, Discovery Theatre, Regional Events, and the Art Collectors Program.

The Art Collectors Program is devoted to the creation and appreciation of contemporary American limited-edition art and to creating a context for collecting and a forum for artists to discuss their work. The Program sells Smithsonian-commissioned contemporary fine art prints and posters by acclaimed American artists like Sam Gilliam and April Gornik. Its limited-edition prints are numbered and signed and come with a Certificate of Authenticity from the Smithsonian.
