= American Society of Botanical Artists =

American non-profit organization

- Founded: 1994; 32 years ago
- Purpose: botanical art and botanical art education promoting environmental stewardship, ecological sustainability, and plant conservation
- Location: headquartered at the New York Botanical Garden
- Members: 2000
- Website: https://www.asba-art.org
- Formerly called: American Society of Botanical Artists

The American Society of Botanical Artists (ASBA) is the principal United States society for those who practice and appreciate contemporary botanical art. Since its founding by Diane Bouchier in 1994, ASBA has grown to nearly 2000 individual members in 39 countries and more than 40 institutional members from around the world.

ASBA members include botanical artists at all levels from beginners to masters, instructors, collectors, curators, botanical gardens, museums, academic institutions, and libraries.

== Definition ==
The Society defines "botanical art" as

- Having an aesthetic appeal, exhibiting the elements and principles of artistic design
- Made to intent of elicit an intellectual or emotional response
- To scale (actual size or scaled enlargement or reduction)
- Free of animals except those that are interdependent with the plant and depicted subordinated to the plant
- Free of backgrounds except for solid colors, textured substrates, or the natural habitat of the plant portrayed subordinate to the plant

== Journals ==
ASBA publishes The Botanical Artist quarterly journal.

== Exhibitions, programs, and awards ==
ASBA organizes an Annual International juried exhibition, alternating between west and east coast venues. It produces themed exhibitions triennally in conjunction with the New York Botanical Garden, which then travel to venues in different geographic regions around the US. In 2018, it coordinated a worldwide effort to document wild plant species in 25 countries, each holding exhibitions simultaneously on six continents, called Botanical Art Worldwide. It saw the inception of the Worldwide Day of Botanical Art, on May 18. It presents awards at each exhibition based on merit in a number of categories. ASBA also awards annual grants for individual and group projects of merit. ASBA hosts many virtual and live educational programs relating to botanical art, artists, and timely topics relating to plants, that are open to its members and the public.

- 2010 through 2014 - 13th, 14th, 15th, 16th, 17th International ASBA Botanical Art Exhibition at the Horticultural Society of New York
- 2015 through 2017 - 18th, 19th, 20th Annual International Exhibition at The New York Design Center
- Fall 2018 - 21st Annual International Exhibition at Wave Hill
- Fall 2019 - 22nd Annual International Exhibition at Marin Art & Garden Center, Ross, CA
- Fall 2020 - 23rd Annual International Exhibition at Wave Hill
