= W. John Kress =

American botanist and curator

- Born: March 4, 1951 (age 75); Illinois, US
- Education: Harvard University
- Known for: Systematic biology
- Spouse: Lidnesy Clarkson
- Scientific career
- Fields: Tropical ecology
- Academic advisors: P.B. Tomlinson

Walter John Emil Kress (born March 4, 1951) is an American botanist and the vice-president for science at the National Museum of Natural History. He currently holds the appointment (2010) as the Director of the Consortium for Understanding and Sustaining a Biodiverse Planet at the Smithsonian Institution and is the former Executive Director of the Association for Tropical Biology and Conservation.

== Early life and education ==
Kress was born in Illinois on March 4, 1951.

Kress received his education at Harvard University (B.A.,1975) and Duke University (Ph.D., 1981), studying tropical ecology, plant systematics, pollination ecology, and ethnobotany.

Kress' travels to tropical regions began as a graduate student, where he conducted post-doctorate research in Colombia. His dissertation was mainly focused on the plants in the genus Heliconia. Kress focused on both the systematics and the plant-animal interactions of this group. His research later took him to Las Cruces Botanic Garden in San Vito, where he studied what factors may prevent species hybridization. He is responsible for the collection of many of the Zingiberales from around the country that exist in the botanic garden today.

== Research ==
Kress is now the vice-president of science at the National Museum of Natural History, where he formerly held positions of Curator and Chairman of the Department of Botany. Kress worked formerly as the director of research at the Marie Selby Botanical Gardens in Florida from 1984 to 1988.

Focusing mostly on the Zingiberales, including Heliconia, Musa, and other gingers, Kress has extensively studied the systematics and plant animal interactions of this order. His current research is focused on biodiversity genomics, conservation, and the Anthropocene. Kress' publications regarding the Anthropocene warn that human-created complexes, still-to-be-resolved issues, including the impacts of climate change, will endanger humanity's future if they are not addressed immediately.

=== Tropical plant diversity ===
Kress is responsible for the variety of Heliconias in Las Cruces Botanic Garden as well but a garden planted in an enclosed aviary in Dominica’s mountains. The main purpose of this garden was so that he and his colleagues could watch the hummingbirds interact with plants in an experimental situation. He claims that seeing that symbiosis between Heliconia and hummingbirds allowed him to gain deeper understanding of the mechanism of evolution.

=== Systematics and taxonomy ===
Published findings by Kress include the lineages of and the divergence of Zingiberales. His research found that speciation from the remaining monocots occurred approximately 124 million years ago. In addition to discovering that major family-level lineages become established in the late Cretaceous (80–110 mya), his research also found that crown lineages within families began diversifying in the early to mid-Tertiary (29–64 mya).

He aided in developing an award-winning smartphone app, Leafsnap, and works as the Principal Investigator of the Leaf Project at the Smithsonian. It is the first mobile tree identification smartphone app, and was a collaboration between Columbia University and the University of Maryland.

=== Conservation ===
His role in collection management at the Smithsonian Institution has made him a spokesman for the importance of collections, explaining how the worldwide decline of specimens in the natural world increases their inherent value. He claims that as the world ages and the natural world changes, museum collections serve as a record for phenology as well as preserve beyond nature. Many of his publications advocate for the conservation of tropical plants, specifically, Zingiberales.

Kress is an advocate for a biodiverse future and serves on a panel that asks difficult questions about sustainability. His role as the director of the Consortium for Understanding and Sustaining a Biodiverse Planet at the Smithsonian Institution has made him a proponent of humans living sustainably prior to irreversible damage occurring to the planet. The consortium originated from a strategic 10-year plan put in place by the Smithsonian Institution to create interdisciplinary work by scholars both related and not related to the Institution. Sustained by a grant from the Bill and Melinda Gates Foundation, the consortium promotes interactions between scholars in complementary fields and has facilitated new avenues of thought in scientific endeavors. Kress, as Director of the Biodiversity and Sustainability Consortium, brings together scientists from numerous fields to address broad research projects that dive deep into questions on biology with relevant societal impacts. Museum collections that Kress manages have aided in the advancement of knowledge and understanding of both life on the planet and how it can be sustained.

== Selected publications ==
- Betts, Matthew G., Hadley, Adam S. and Kress, W. J. 2015. Pollinator recognition by a keystone tropical plant. Proceedings of the National Academy of Sciences of the United States of America, 112(11): 3433–3438. doi:10.1073/pnas.1419522112
- Chen, Juan, Zhao, Jietang, Erickson, David L., Xia, Nianhe and Kress, W. J. 2015. Testing DNA barcodes in closely related species of Curcuma (Zingiberaceae) from Myanmar and China. Molecular Ecology Resources, 15(2): 337–348. doi:10.1111/1755-0998.12319
- Bawa, K. S., Kress, W. John, Nadkarni, N. M. and Lele, S. 2004. Beyond paradise – meeting the challenge in tropical biology in the 21st Century. Biotropica, 36: 437–446
- Kress, W. J., & Erickson, D. 2012. DNA Barcodes: Methods and Protocols. DNA Barcodes, 3–8. doi:10.1007/978-1-61779-591-6_1
- Kress, W. J. 1990. The phylogeny and classification of the Zingiberales. Annals of the Missouri Botanical Garden, 77: 698–721
- Kress, W. J. 1996. Review of: Diversity and Evolutionary Biology of Tropical Flowers. Quart.Rev.Biol., 71: 124–125
- Kress, W. J. 1990. The diversity and distribution of Heliconia (Heliconiaceae) in Brazil. Acta botânica brasilica, 4: 159–167
- Kress, W. J., Wurdack, Kenneth J., Zimmer, Elizabeth Anne, Weigt, Lee A. and Janzen, Daniel H. 2005. Use of DNA barcodes to identify flowering plants.Proceedings of the National Academy of Sciences of the United States of America, 102: 8369–8374

The standard author abbreviation W.J.Kress is used to indicate this person as the author when citing a botanical name.

== Awards and distinctions ==
Kress is currently a fellow of the American Association for the Advancement of Science, a non-profit with the goal of promoting science and defending scientific freedom. Members play an active role in advocacy for a future with science. Additionally, since 1997 he has held the seat as Executive Director of the Association for Tropical Biology and Conservation. He has been appointed as an Adjunct Professor of Biology at George Mason University in Virginia, at George Washington University in Washington, D.C., and at Xishuangbanna Tropical Botanical Garden, Chinese Academy of Sciences, in Yunnan.

- 2008: Lifetime Achievement Award from Heliconia Society International
- 2013: Honorary Fellow of the Association for Tropical Biology and Conservation
- 2013: Parker/Gentry Award for Excellence and Innovation in Conservation and Environmental Biology from the Field Museum
- 2018: Edward O. Wilson Biodiversity Technology Pioneer Award
