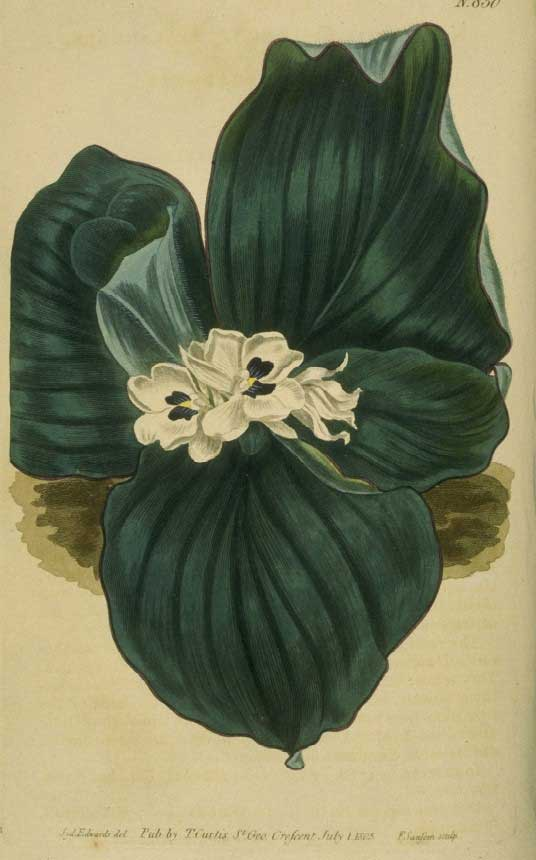
- Drawing from an 1805 issue of The Botanical Magazine

Scientific classification
- Kingdom: Plantae
- Clade: Tracheophytes
- Clade: Angiosperms
- Clade: Monocots
- Clade: Commelinids
- Order: Zingiberales
- Family: Zingiberaceae
- Genus: Kaempferia
- Species: K. galanga

Binomial name
- Kaempferia galanga L.

= Kaempferia galanga =

Species of flowering plant

Kaempferia galanga, commonly known as kencur, aromatic ginger, sand ginger, cutcherry, is a monocotyledonous plant in the ginger family, and one of four plants called galangal. It is found primarily in open areas in Indonesia, southern China, Taiwan, Cambodia, and India, but is also widely cultivated throughout Southeast Asia.

== Culinary and medical use ==
Kaempferia galanga is used as a spice in cooking in Indonesia, where it is called kencur ('cekur' in Malaysia), and especially in Javanese and Balinese cuisines. Beras kencur, which combines dried K. galanga powder with rice flour, is a particularly popular jamu herbal drink. Its leaves are also used in the Malay rice dish, nasi ulam.

Unlike the similar Boesenbergia rotunda (Thai กระชาย krachai), K. galanga is not commonly used in Thai cuisine, but can be bought as a dried rhizome or in powder form at herbal medicine stalls. It is known in Thai as proh horm (เปราะหอม) or waan horm (ว่านหอม), and in Khmer as prâh (ប្រោះ) or prâh krâ-oup (ប្រោះក្រអូប). It is also used in Chinese cooking and Chinese medicine, and is sold in Chinese groceries under the name sha jiang (Chinese: 沙 姜; pinyin: shajiang), while the plant itself is referred to as shan nai (Chinese: 山 柰; pinyin: shannai). Kaempferia galanga has a peppery camphorous taste.

== Similar species ==
K. galanga is differentiated from other galangals by the absence of stem and dark brown, rounded rhizomes, while the other varieties all have stems and pale rosebrown rhizomes. It is also sometimes called lesser galangal, which properly refers to Alpinia officinarum.

- Alpinia galanga
- Alpinia zerumbet
- Curcuma longa
- Etlingera elatior
- Etlingera maingayi
- Etlingera fulgens
- Kaempferia angustifolia
- Kaempferia rotunda
- Zingiber cassumunar
- Zingiber officinale

== Chemical constituents ==
The rhizomes of aromatic ginger have been reported to contain cineol, borneol, 3-carene, camphene, kaempferol, kaempferide, cinnamaldehyde, p-methoxycinnamic acid, ethyl cinnamate, and ethyl p-methoxycinnamate. A study made a list of chemicals classified based on their different chemical groups

- Terpenoids (26)
- Phenolics (15)
- Polysaccharides (15)
- Flavonoids (3)
- FattyAcids and Esters (11)
- DiarylHeptanoids (6)
- Cyclic Dipeptides (6)

== Insecticidal research ==
Extracts of the plant kill larvae of several species of mosquito including some that are disease vectors. As a result of these findings, research is underway to evaluate the plant extract's use as an insect repellent, with preliminary findings suggesting it is not an irritant to the skin of rats.

== Extracts and essential oils ==
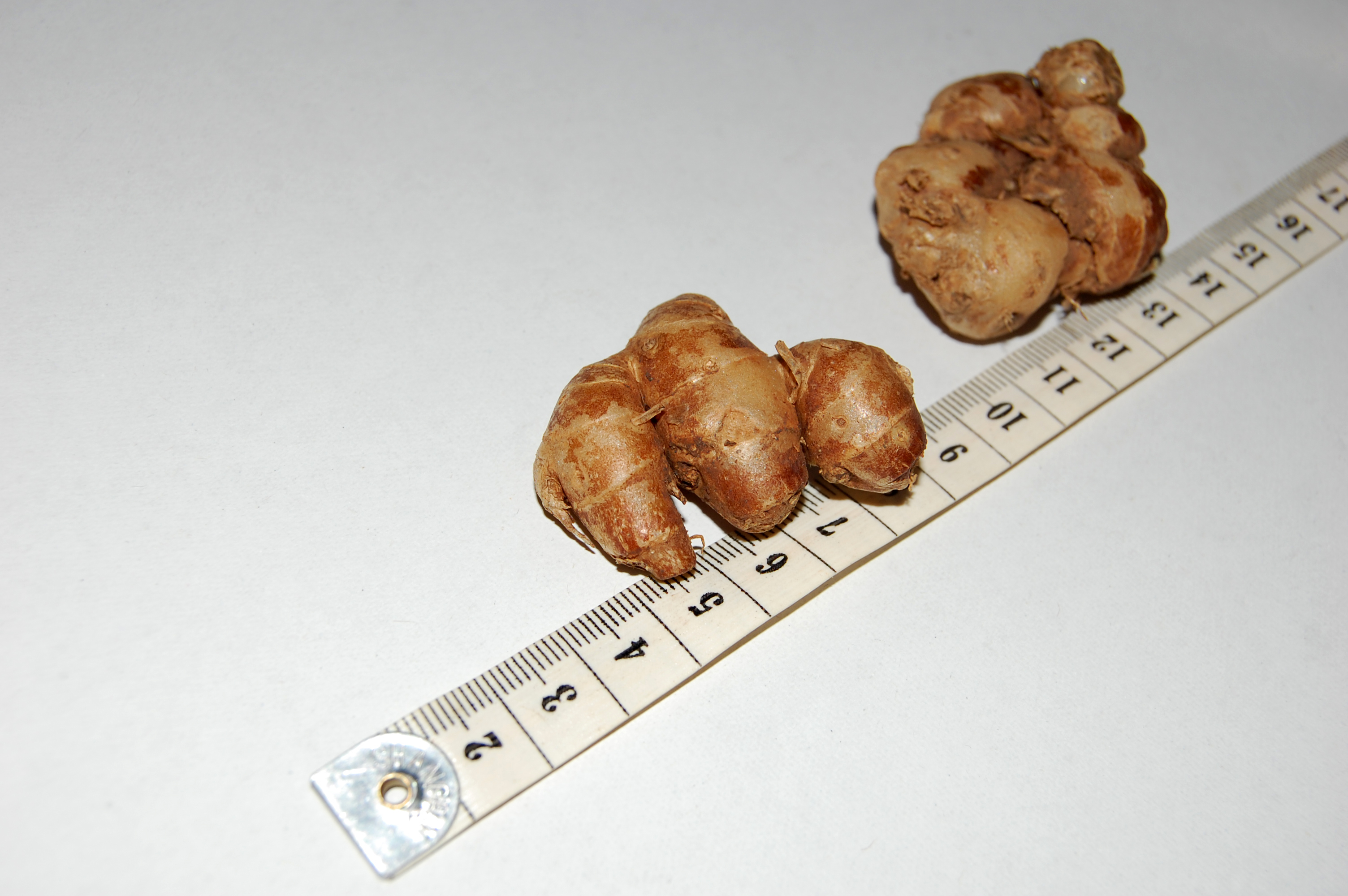
Kaempferia galanga rhizomes

The rhizomes of the plant, which contain essential oils, have been used in traditional Chinese medicine as a decoction or powder. Its alcoholic maceration has also been applied as liniment for rheumatism. The extract causes central nervous system depression, a decrease in motor activity, and a decrease in respiratory rate.

The decoctions and the sap of the leaves may have hallucinogenic properties, which may be due to unidentified chemical components of the plant's essential oil fraction.

A purified extract of K. galanga and polyester-8 stabilize the UV-absorptive properties of sunscreen combinations containing avobenzone.

== Aroma attributes ==
- Borneol
- 1,8-Cineole
- Ethyl cinnamate
- Ethyl p-methoxycinnamate
- Gamma-car-3-ene
- Pentadecane

== See also ==
- Insect repellent
- Kaempferol
- Desi Sangye Gyatso
- Galangal
- Kaempferia rotunda
