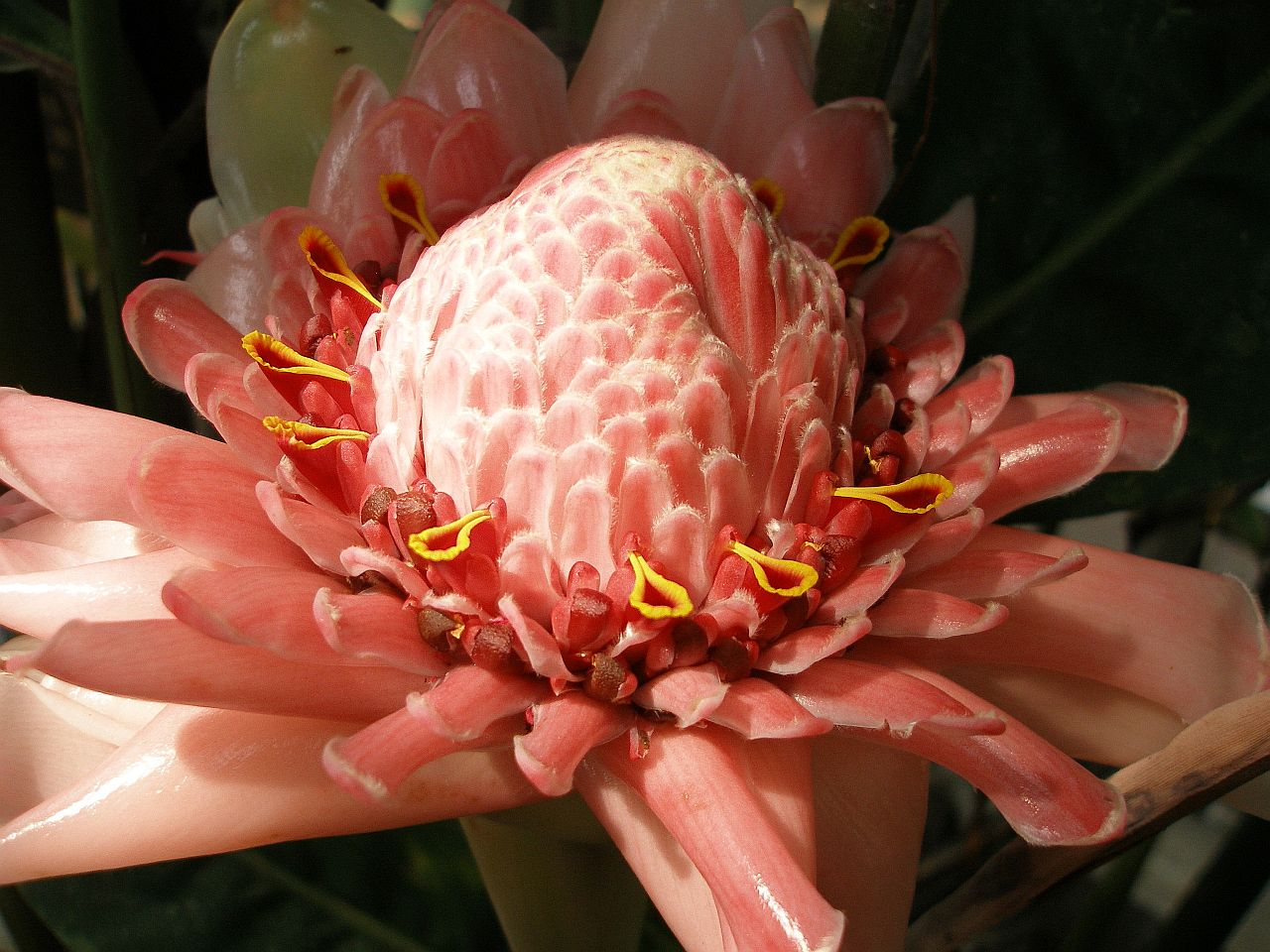

Conservation status
- Data Deficient (IUCN 3.1)

Scientific classification
- Kingdom: Plantae
- Clade: Tracheophytes
- Clade: Angiosperms
- Clade: Monocots
- Clade: Commelinids
- Order: Zingiberales
- Family: Zingiberaceae
- Genus: Etlingera
- Species: E. elatior

Binomial name
- Etlingera elatior (Jack) R.M.Sm.

Synonyms
- Alpinia acrostachya Steud.; Alpinia elatior Jack; Alpinia magnifica Roscoe; Alpinia speciosa (Blume) D.Dietr.; Amomum tridentatum (Kuntze) K.Schum.; Bojeria magnifica (Roscoe) Raf.; Cardamomum magnificum (Roscoe) Kuntze; Cardamomum tridentatum Kuntze; Diracodes javanica Blume; Elettaria speciosa Blume; Etlingera elatior var. pileng Ongsakul & C.K.Lim; Hornstedtia imperialis (Lindl.) Ridl.; Nicolaia elatior (Jack) Horan.; Nicolaia imperialis Horan.; Nicolaia intermedia Valeton; Nicolaia magnifica (Roscoe) K.Schum. ex Valeton; Nicolaia speciosa (Blume) Horan.; Phaeomeria magnifica (Roscoe) K.Schum.; Phaeomeria speciosa (Blume) Koord.

= Etlingera elatior =

Species of herbaceous perennial plant

Etlingera elatior (also known as torch ginger, among other names) is a species of herbaceous perennial plant in the family Zingiberaceae, native to the Malay Peninsular, the islands of Indonesia and New Guinea of the Malesia bioregion.

The showy pink flowers are used in decorative arrangements and are an important ingredient in food across Southeast Asia.

== Names ==
E. elatior is also known as "torch ginger", "ginger flower", "red ginger lily", "torchflower", "torch lily", "wild ginger", "Indonesian tall ginger" and "porcelain rose".

In other languages, it is known as: "Philippine wax flower"; Sundanese: honje; Javanese: combrang; Indonesian: kecombrang or cekala (Sumatra); Standard Malay: bunga kantan; Sinhala: ගොඩ ඕලු (goda olu), ගොඩ නෙලුම් (goda nelum), or සිද්ධාර්ථ (siddartha); Chinese: 火炬姜 (pinyin: huǒjù jiāng); Spanish: boca de dragón; French: rose de porcelaine; Thai: ดาหลา (dala).

== Description ==
The species grows as a pseudostem from a rhizome; it takes about 18–22 days for the first leaf to grow from the rhizome. The leafy shoot lasts for about 70 days and may reach a height of 3–6 metres. Its leaves are leathery and grow around 85 cm (33 in) long and 18 cm (7 in) broad with a central groove. The fibers of Etlingera elatior are strong.

=== Flower ===
The capitate inflorescence appears from the shoot after 30 days, reaching a height of 2.5 m it swells gradually and turns pink before blooming after more than 50 days. The inflorescence is made of 20–25 layers of floral bracts and 3-4 layers of involuceral bracts at full bloom; it may have 90-120 true flowers inside. The capitulum can reach a diameter of 25 cm.

=== Chemistry ===
From the leaves of E. elatior, three caffeoylquinic acids, including chlorogenic acid (CGA), as well as three flavonoids quercitrin, isoquercitrin and catechin, have been isolated. Content of CGA was significantly higher than flowers of Lonicera japonica (Japanese honeysuckle), the commercial source.

A protocol for producing a standardized herbal extract of CGA from leaves of E. elatior (40%) has been developed, compared to commercial CGA extracts from honeysuckle flowers (25%).

=== Similar species ===
- Alpinia galanga
- Curcuma longa
- Etlingera fulgens
- Etlingera maingayi
- Kaempferia galanga

== Uses ==
The flower buds are edible. In North Sumatra (especially among the Karo people), the flower buds are used in a stewed fish dish called Arsik ikan mas (Andaliman-spiced carp). In Bali, people use the white part of the bottom part of the trunk for cooking chilli sauce called "Sambal Bongkot", and use the flower buds to make chilli sauce called "Sambal Kecicang".

In Thailand, it is eaten in a kind of Thai salad preparation. In Malaysia, the flower is an essential ingredient in cooking the fish broth for a kind of spicy sour noodle soup called "asam laksa" (also known as "Penang laksa"), in the preparation of a kind of salad called kerabu and many other Malay dishes. The fruit is also used in Indonesian cooking.

In Karo, it is known as asam cekala (asam meaning 'sour'), and the flower buds, but more importantly the ripe seed pods, which are packed with small black seeds, are an essential ingredient of the Karo version of sayur asam, and are particularly suited to cooking fresh fish. In Sundanese, it is known as Honje.

== Gallery ==
Etlingera elatior
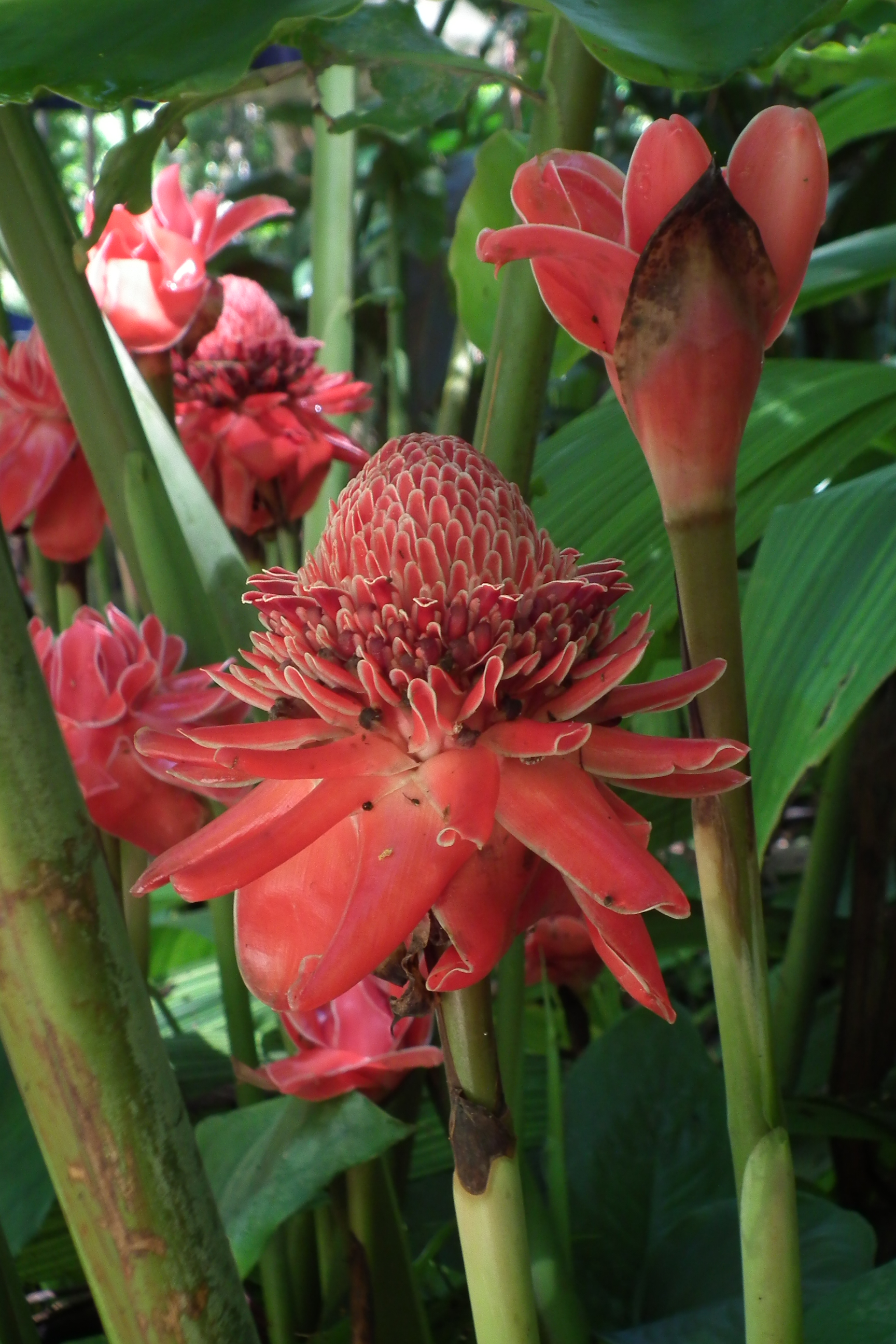
Luang Prabang, Laos

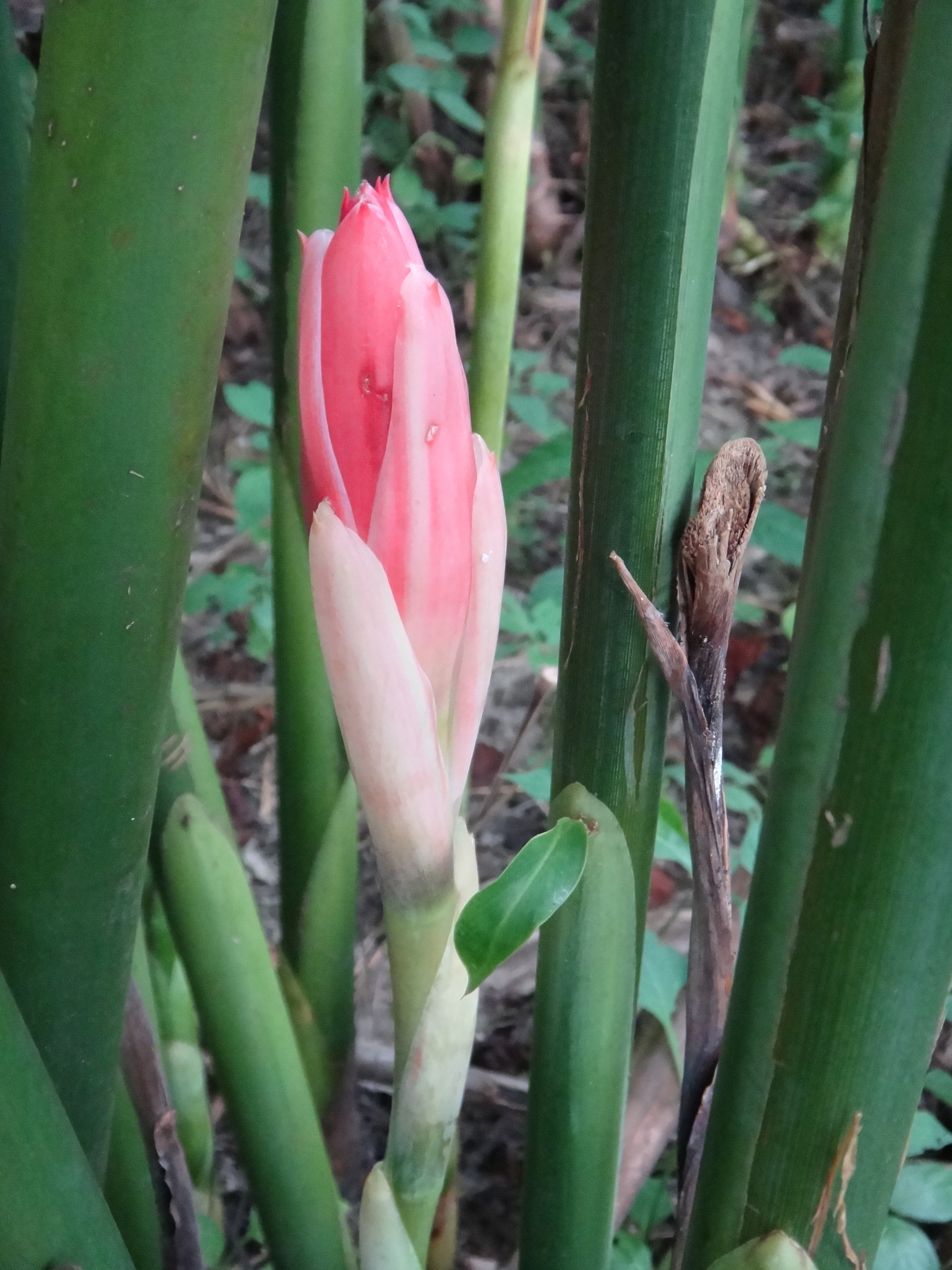

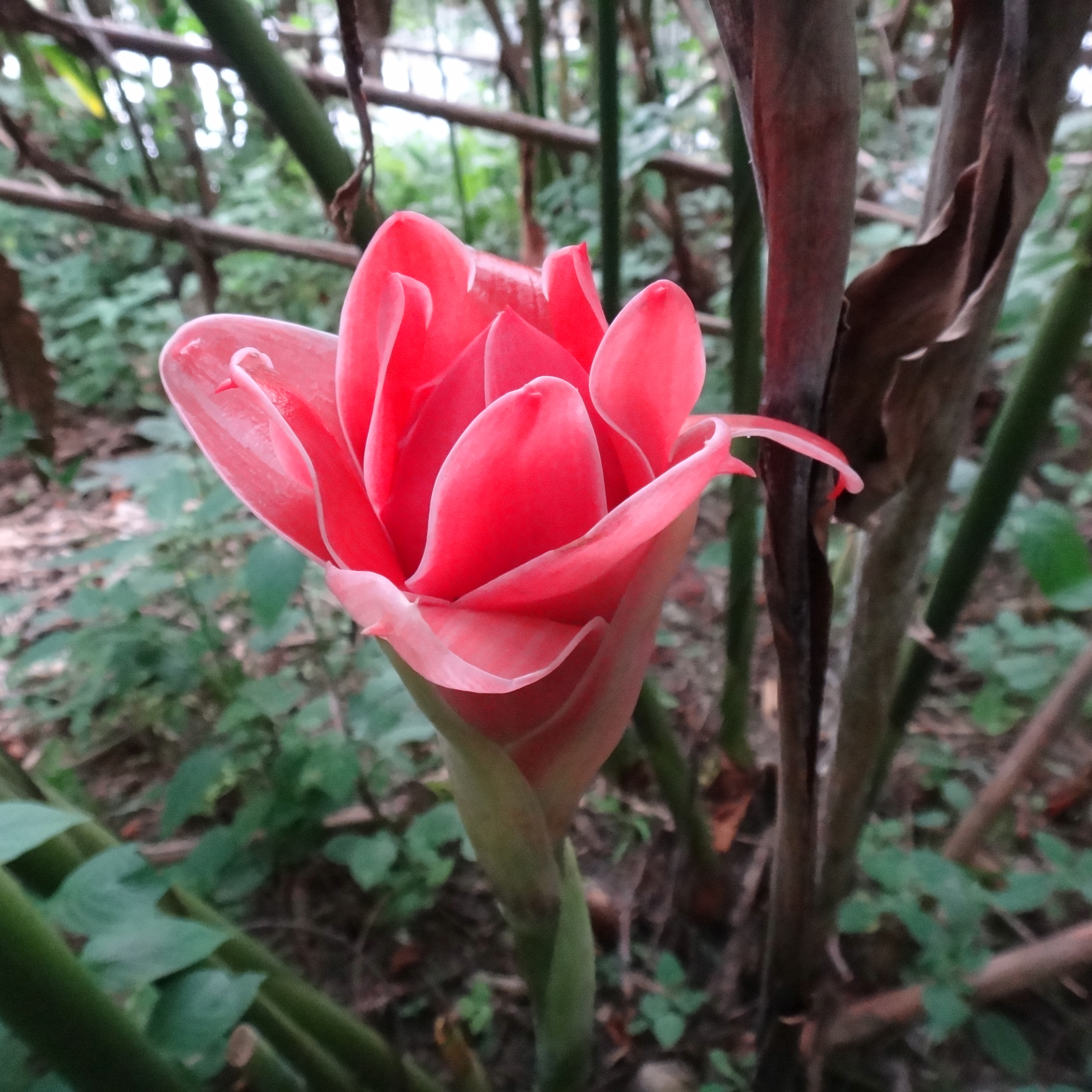

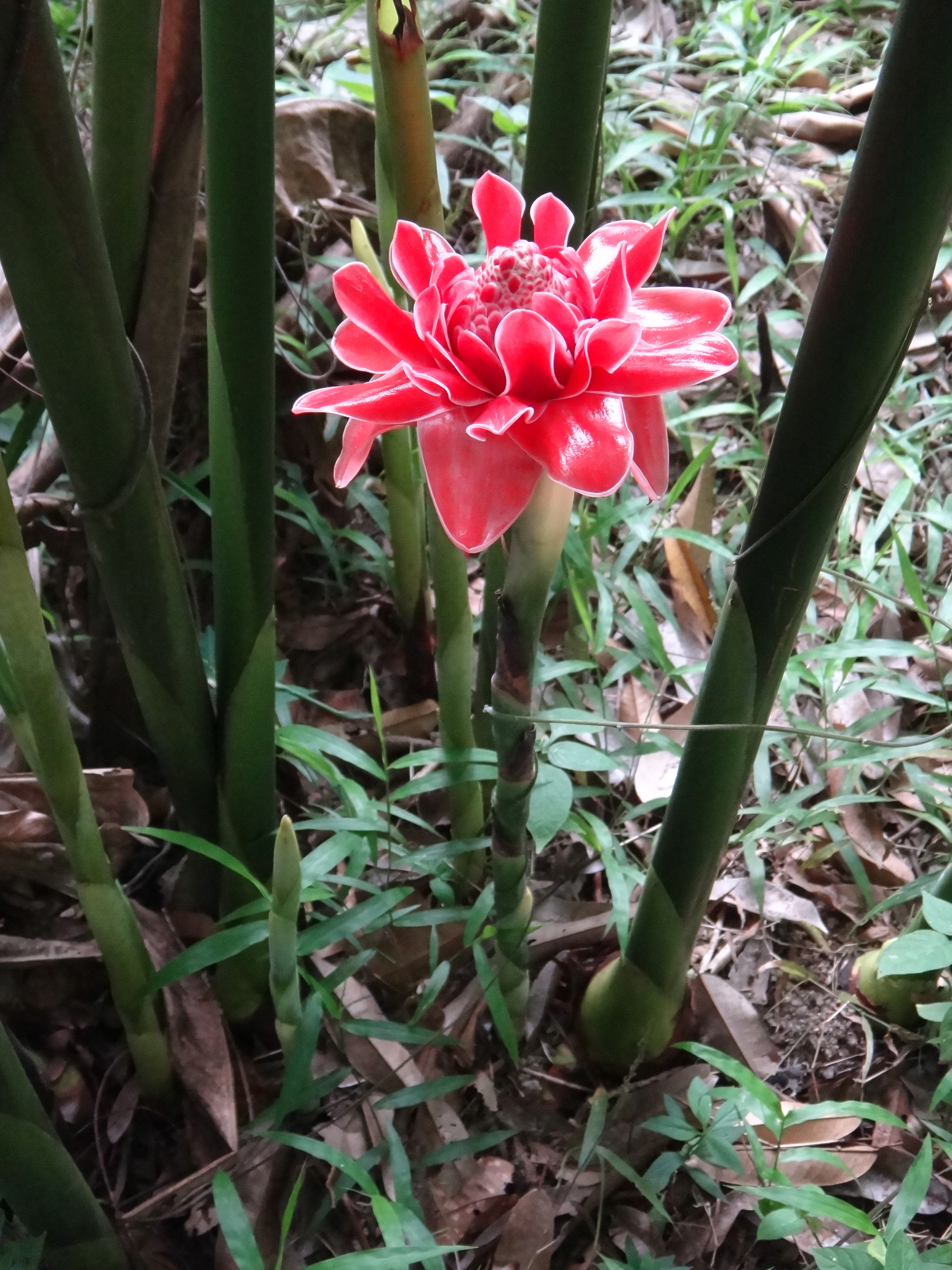

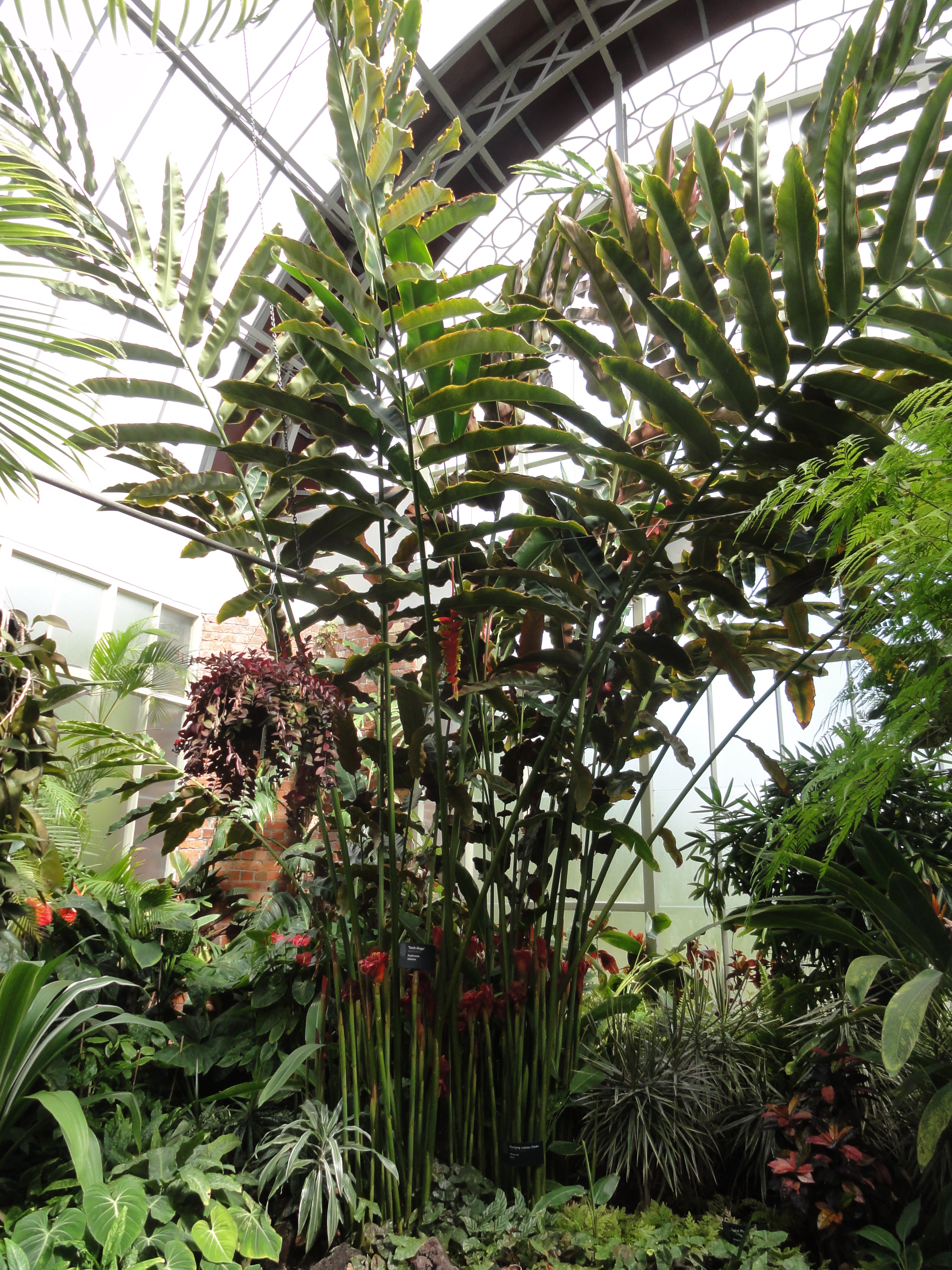

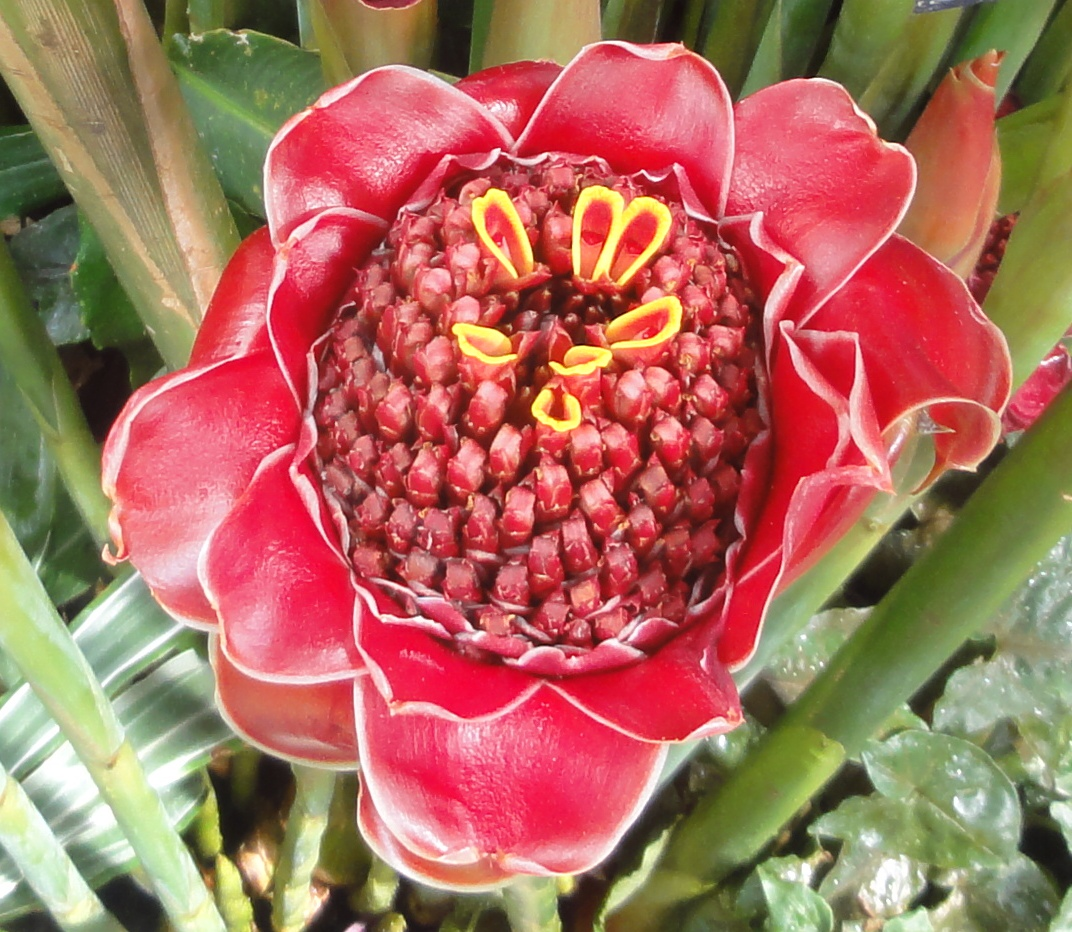

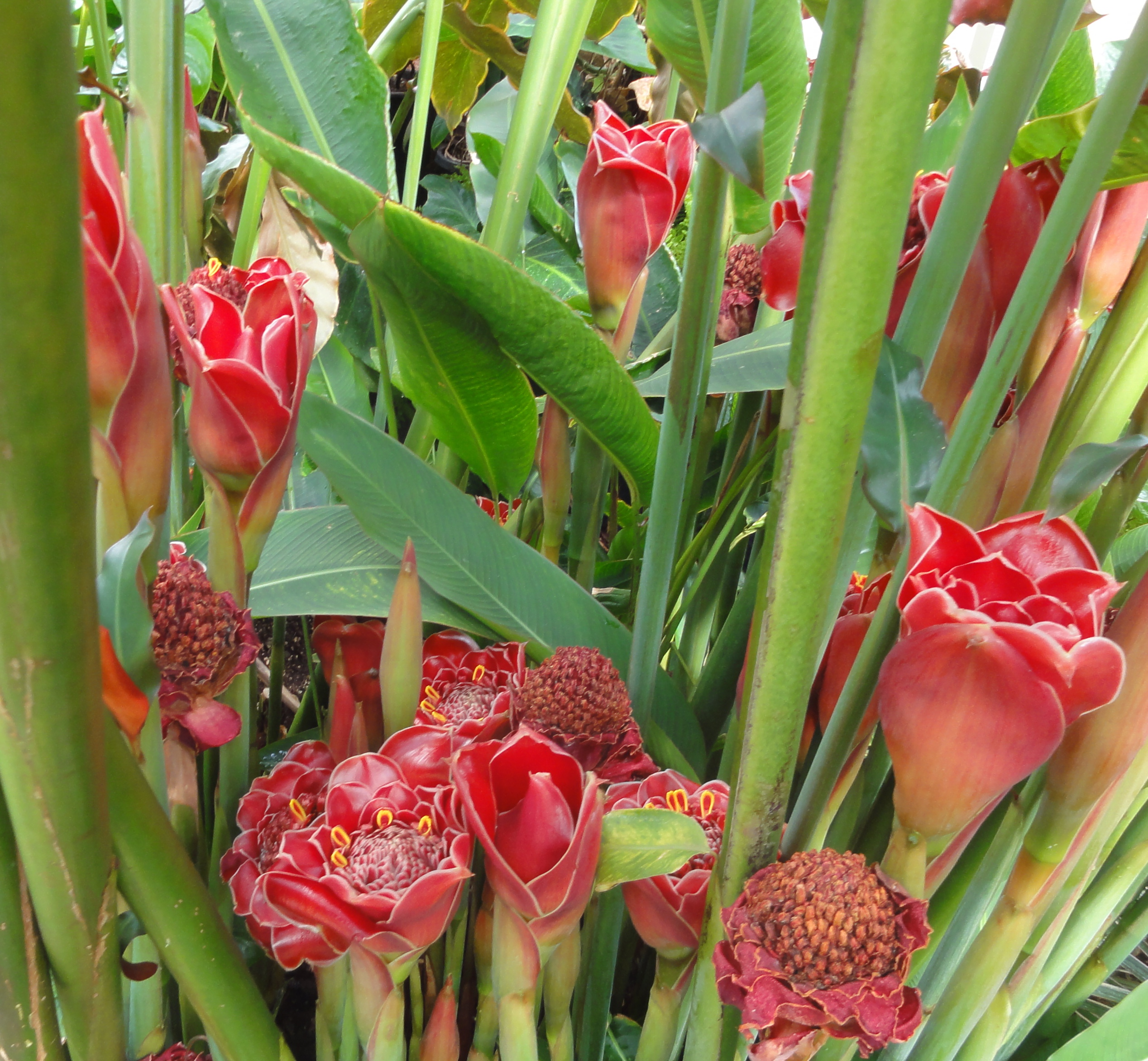

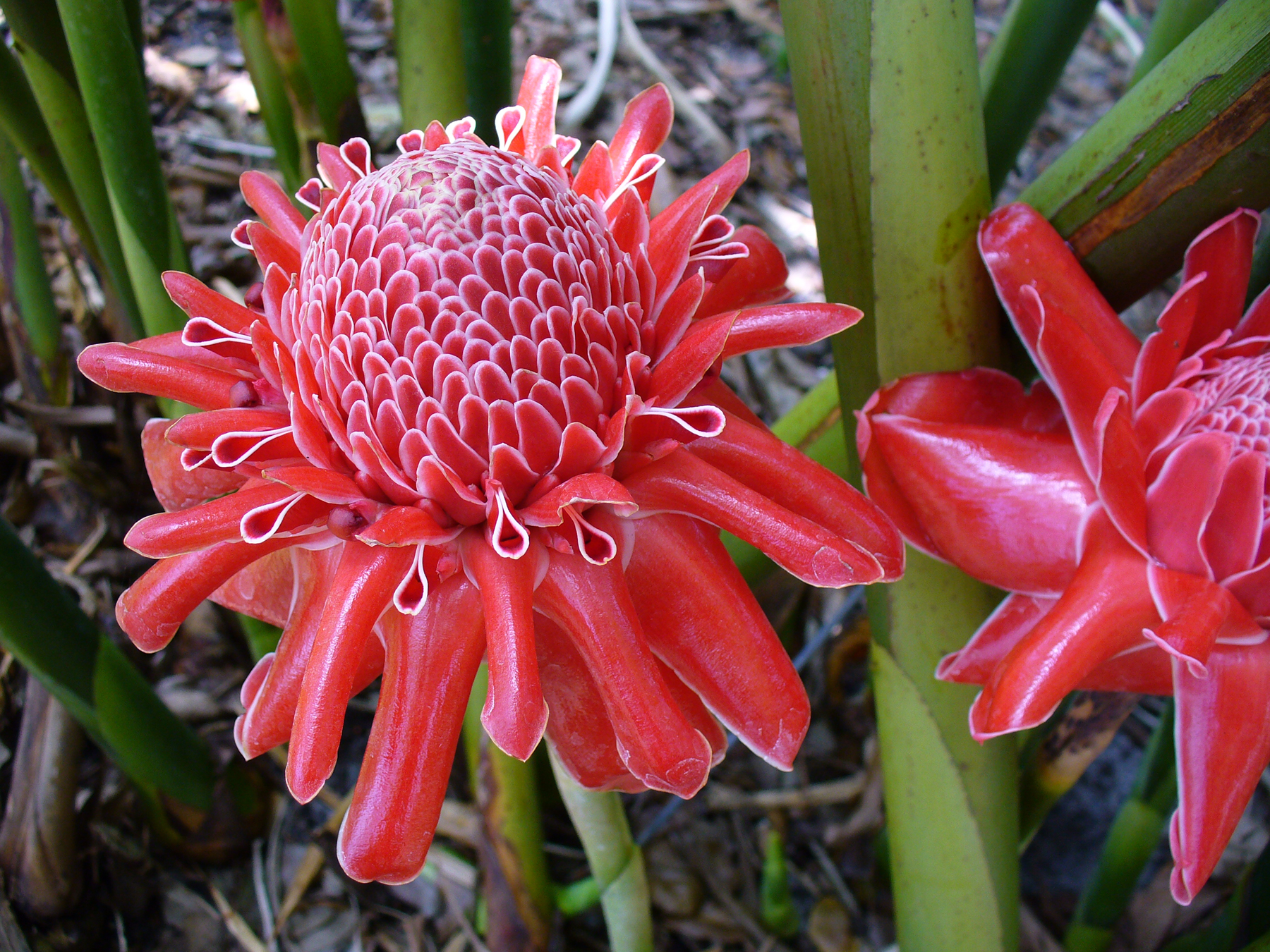

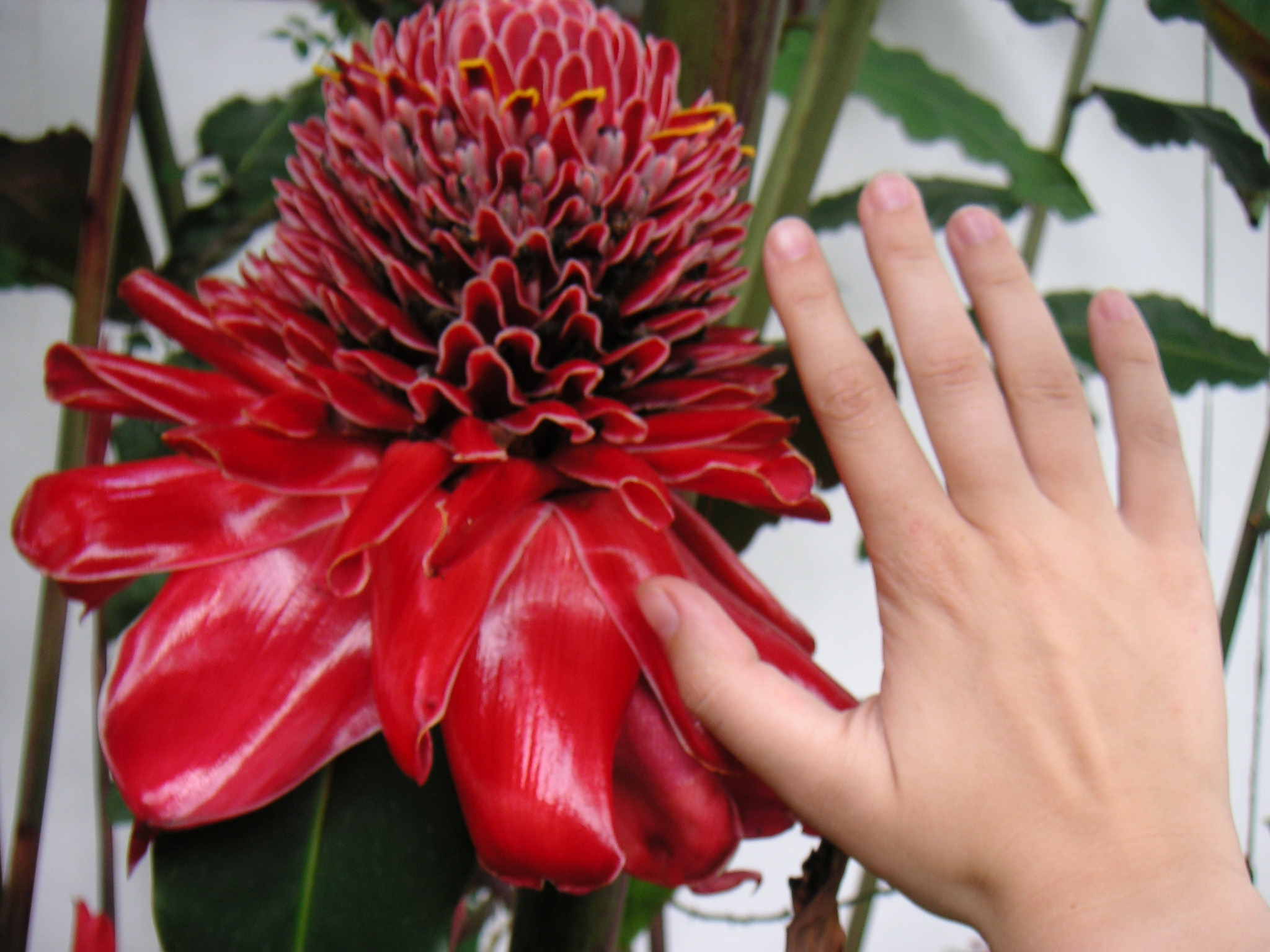

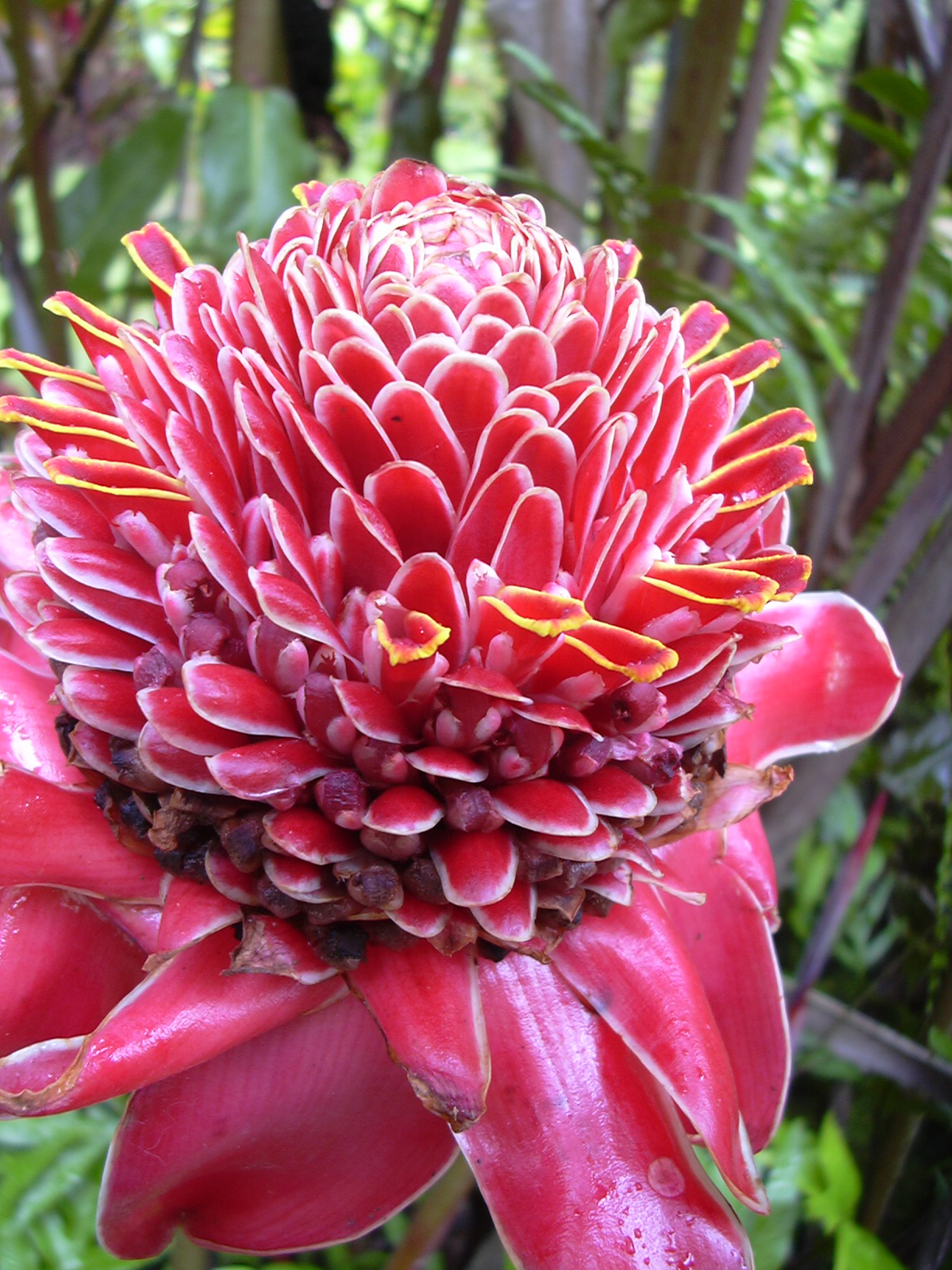

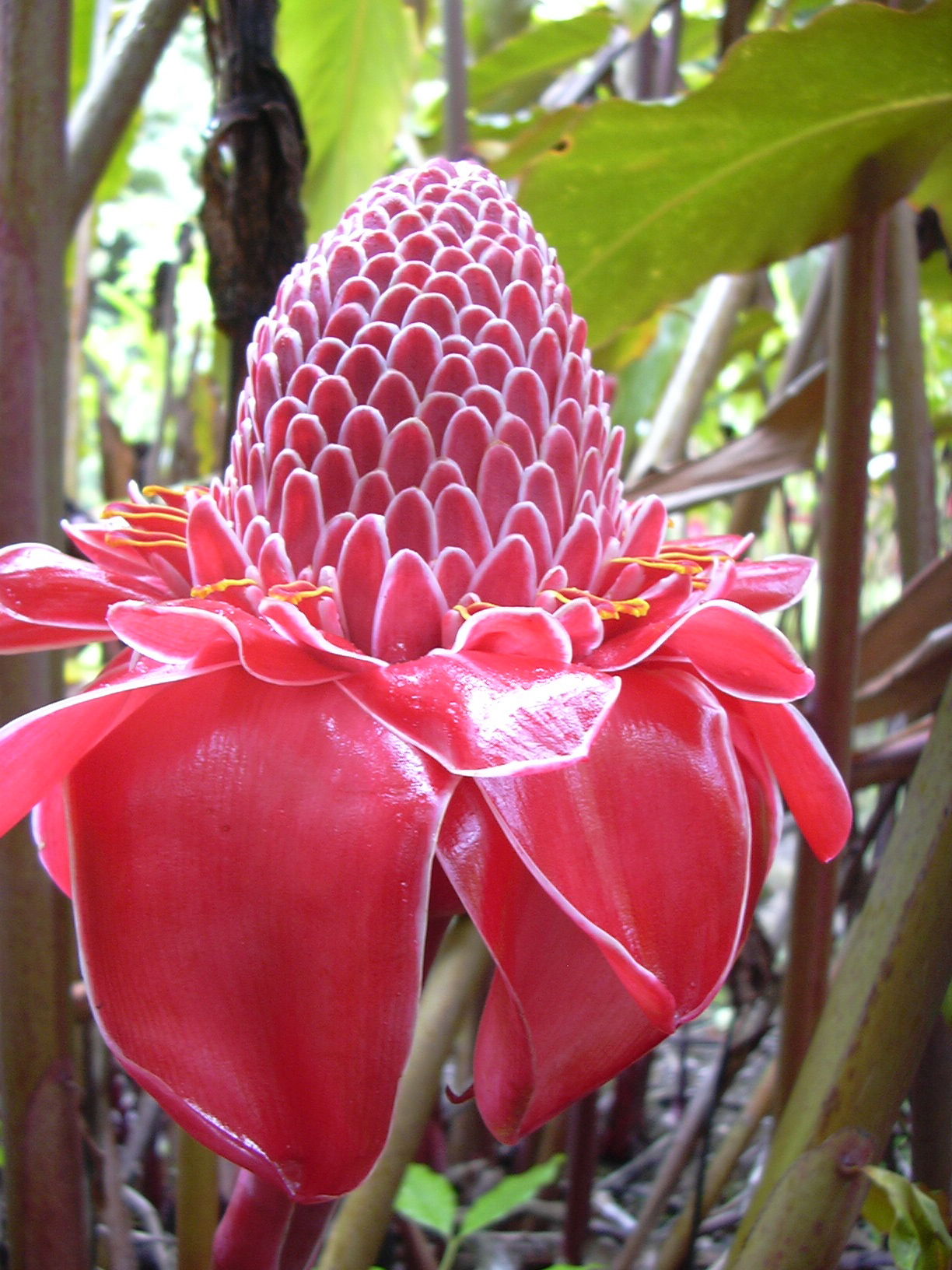

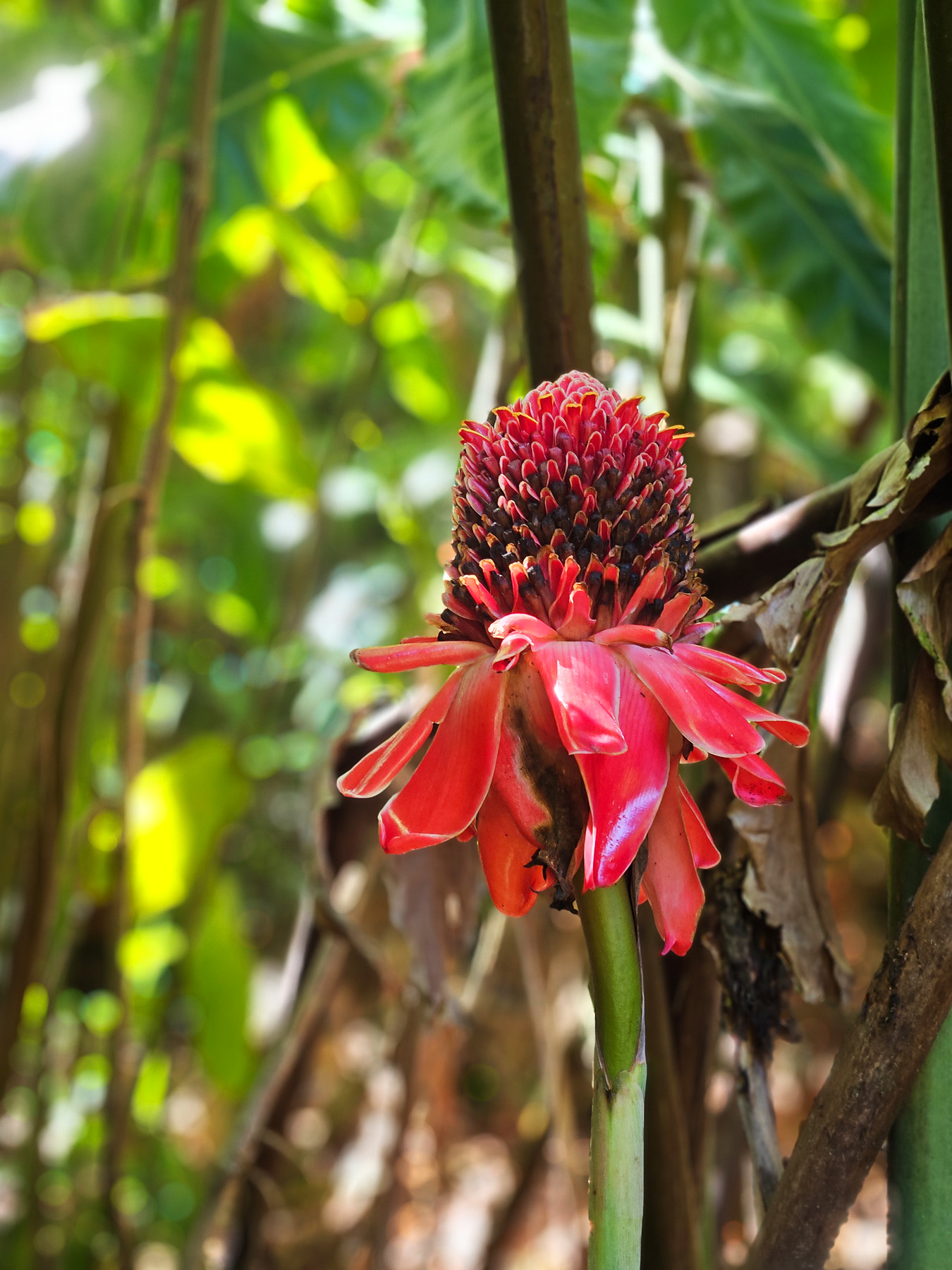
Etlingera elatior (Jack) R.M.Sm. (Maui)

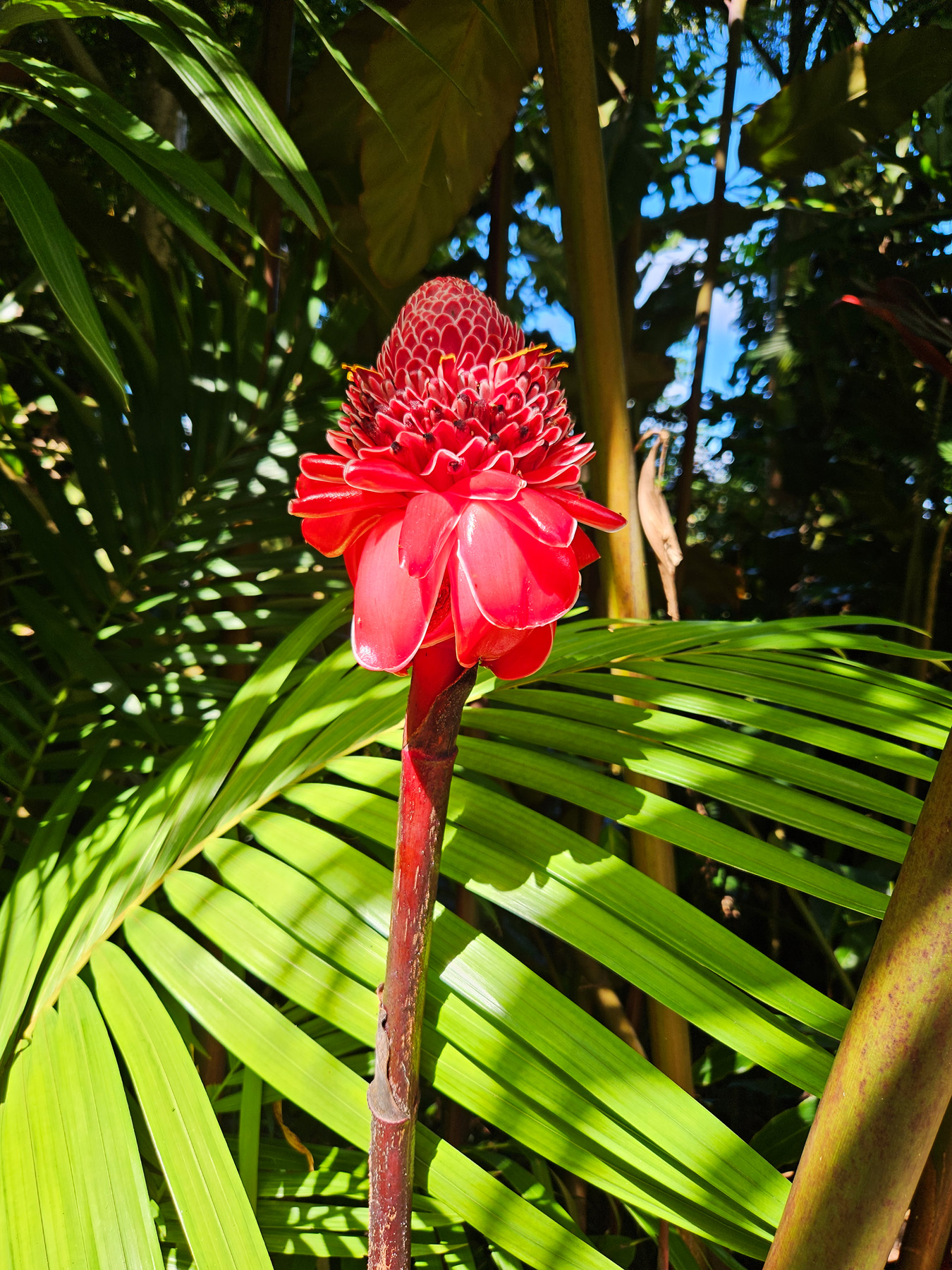
Hawaii, Maui

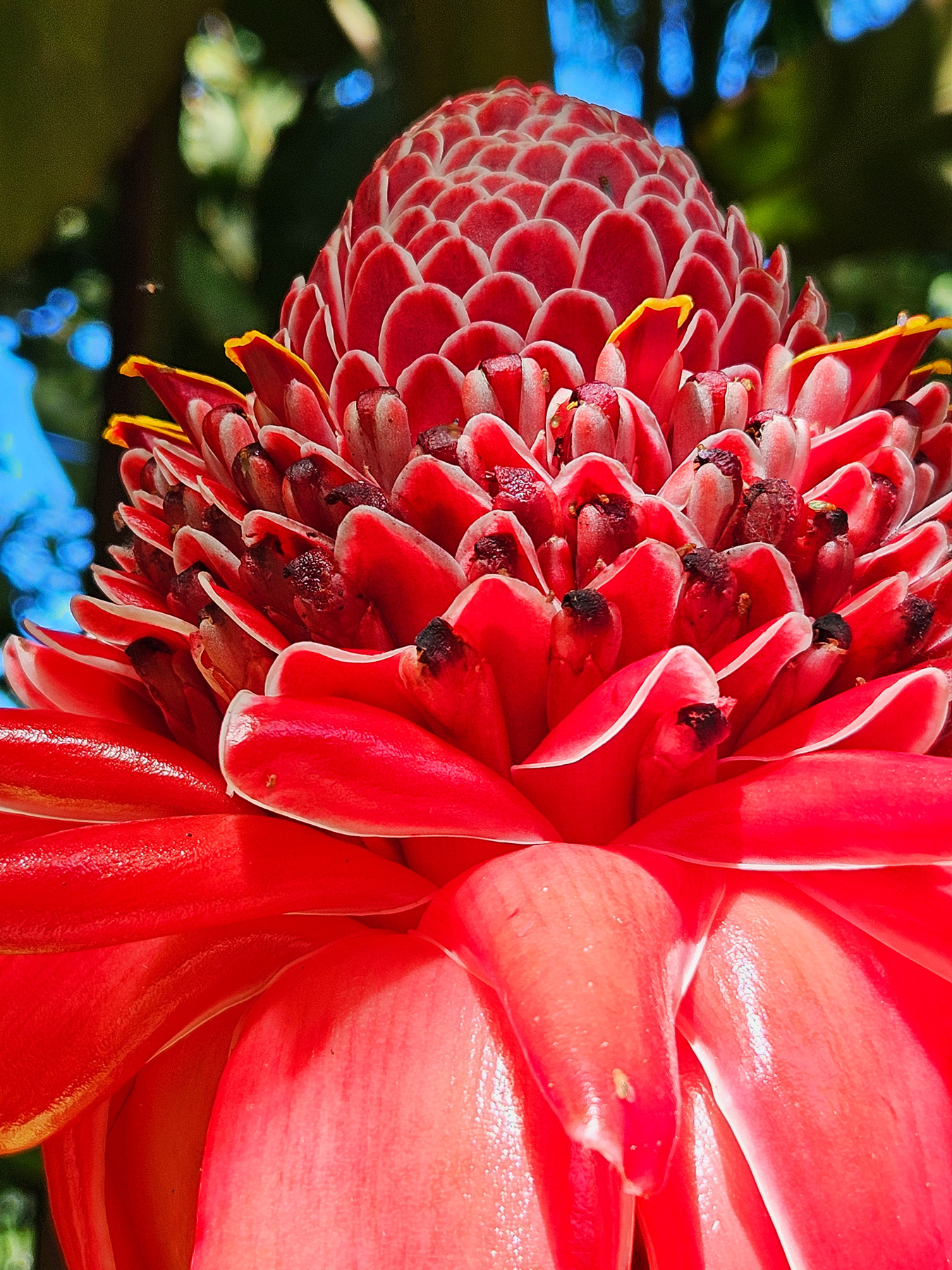
Flower

== See also ==
- Domesticated plants and animals of Austronesia
