= Kaempferia nigrifolia =

Scientific classification
- Kingdom: Plantae
- Clade: Tracheophytes
- Clade: Angiosperms
- Clade: Monocots
- Clade: Commelinids
- Order: Zingiberales
- Family: Zingiberaceae
- Genus: Kaempferia
- Species: K. nigrifolia

Binomial name
- Kaempferia nigrifolia Boonma & Saensouk, 2021

Plant species

Kaempferia nigrifolia is a plant species in the genus Kaempferia subgenus kaempferia found in Nakhon Nayok Province and Saraburi Province, Thailand. It is similar to Kaempferia pulchra.
