= Kaempferia parviflora =

Conservation status
- Data Deficient (IUCN 3.1)

Scientific classification
- Kingdom: Plantae
- Clade: Embryophytes
- Clade: Tracheophytes
- Clade: Angiosperms
- Clade: Monocots
- Clade: Commelinids
- Order: Zingiberales
- Family: Zingiberaceae
- Genus: Kaempferia
- Species: K. parviflora

Binomial name
- Kaempferia parviflora Wall. ex Baker

Species of flowering plant

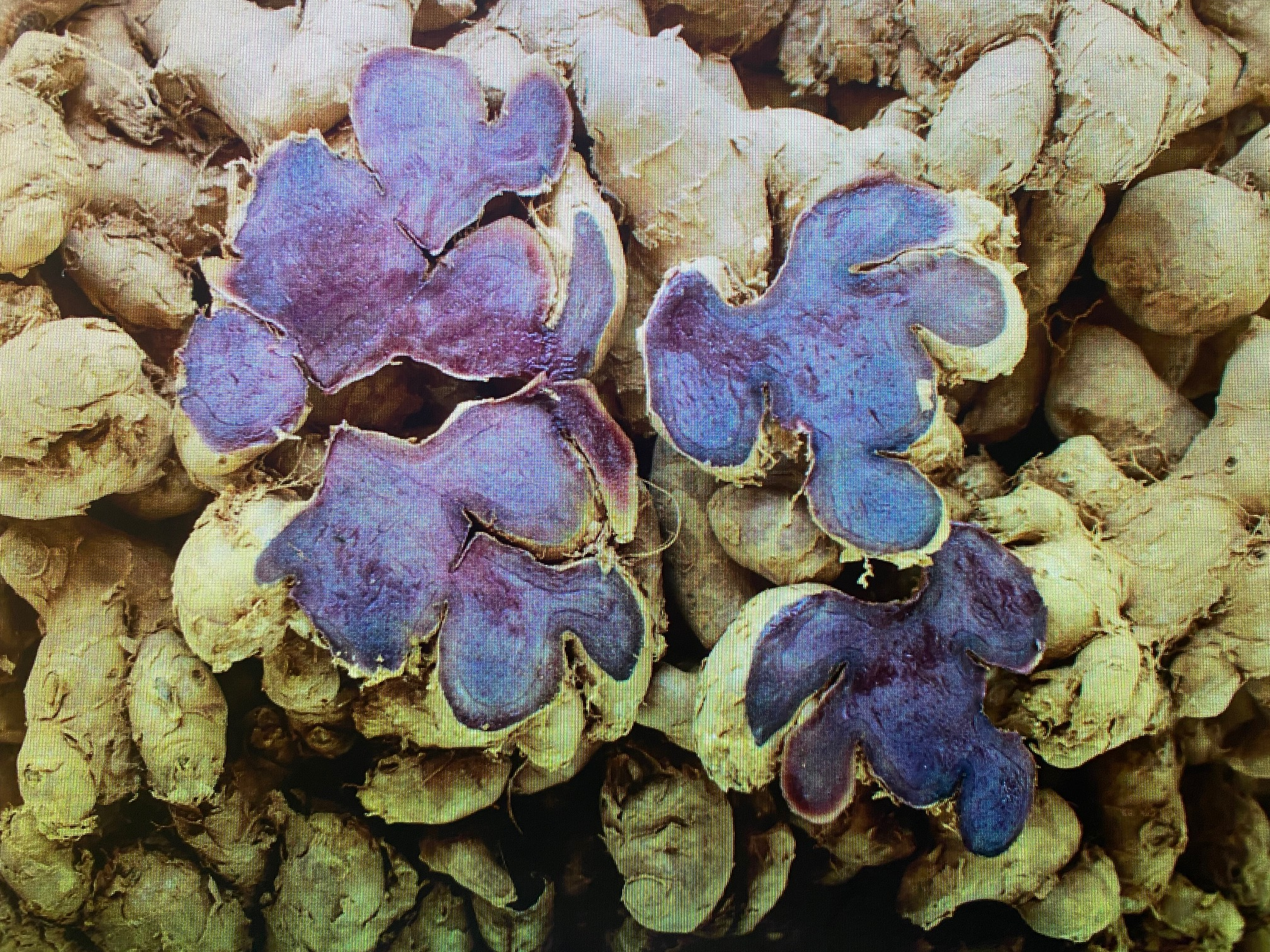
Sliced rhizomes of Kaempferia parviflora showing the characteristic dark purple interior

Kaempferia parviflora, the Thai black ginger, Thai ginseng or krachai dum, is an herbaceous plant in the family Zingiberaceae, native to Thailand. Kaempferia parviflora has been the subject of increased scientific interest in recent years. In a systematic review in 2016, 683 records and 7 studies were analyzed, with a reference that krachai dum significantly increased hand grip strength and enhanced the response to sexual erotic stimuli. An earlier study found that acute dosing did not have an effect on sprint and endurance exercise in humans, but indicated that chronic effects or actions in other populations cannot be excluded. A study from 2007 found that the ethanolic extract but not the volatile oil of Kaempferia parviflora had antiallergic properties.
