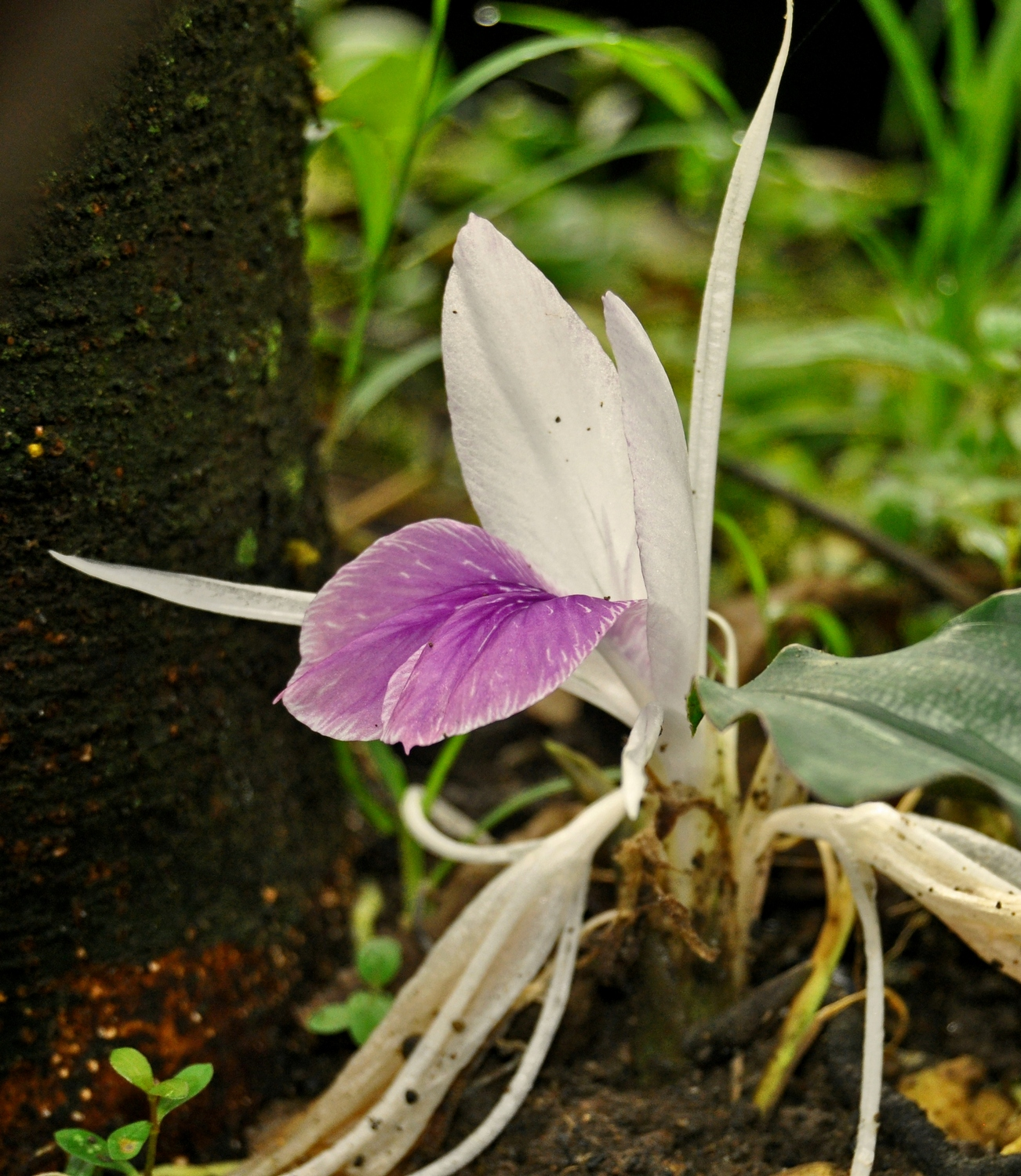
- Kaempferia rotunda

Scientific classification
- Kingdom: Plantae
- Clade: Tracheophytes
- Clade: Angiosperms
- Clade: Monocots
- Clade: Commelinids
- Order: Zingiberales
- Family: Zingiberaceae
- Subfamily: Zingiberoideae
- Tribe: Zingibereae
- Genus: Kaempferia; L.

Synonyms
- Zerumbet Garsault, invalid name; Monolophus Wall.; Tritophus T.Lestib.

= Kaempferia =

Genus of flowering plants

Kaempferia is a genus of plants in the ginger family. It is native to China, India, and Southeast Asia.

The genus is named after the naturalist and traveller Engelbert Kaempfer, who lived in Japan and east Asia for the years 1689-1693 and was one of the first Europeans to write detailed descriptions of plants there.

== Species ==
As of June 2025, Plants of the World Online accepts the following 67 species:

- Kaempferia albiflora Jenjitt. & Ruchis.
- Kaempferia alboviolacea Ridl.
- Kaempferia angustifolia Roscoe
- Kaempferia attapeuensis Picheans. & Koonterm
- Kaempferia aurora Noppornch. & Jenjitt.
- Kaempferia caespitosa Noppornch. & Jenjitt.
- Kaempferia champasakensis Picheans. & Koonterm
- Kaempferia chaveerachiae Saensouk, P.Saensouk & Boonma
- Kaempferia chayanii Koonterm
- Kaempferia cuneata Gagnep.
- Kaempferia daklakensis H.T.Nguyen & Nghiem
- Kaempferia elegans Wall.
- Kaempferia evansii Blatt.
- Kaempferia fallax Gagnep.
- Kaempferia filifolia K.Larsen
- Kaempferia fissa Gagnep.
- Kaempferia galanga L.
- Kaempferia gigantiphylla Picheans. & Koonterm
- Kaempferia gilbertii W.Bull
- Kaempferia glauca Ridl.
- Kaempferia graminifolia Noppornch. & Jenjitt.
- Kaempferia grandifolia Saensouk & Jenjitt.
- Kaempferia harmandiana Gagnep.
- Kaempferia isanensis Saensouk & P.Saensouk
- Kaempferia jenjittikuliae Noppornch.
- Kaempferia kamolwaniae Picheans., Meechonkit & Wongsuwan
- Kaempferia kamthornii Picheans. & Meechonkit
- Kaempferia koontermii Prasarn, Wongsuwan & Picheans.
- Kaempferia koratensis Picheans.
- Kaempferia laotica Gagnep.
- Kaempferia larsenii Sirirugsa
- Kaempferia lopburiensis Picheans.
- Kaempferia maculifolia Boonma & Saensouk
- Kaempferia mahasarakhamensis Saensouk & P.Saensouk
- Kaempferia minuta Jenjitt. & K.Larsen
- Kaempferia napavarniae Saensouk, P.Saensouk & Boonma
- Kaempferia nemoralis Insis.
- Kaempferia nigrifolia Boonma & Saensouk
- Kaempferia noctiflora Noppornch. & Jenjitt.
- Kaempferia ovalifolia Roxb.
- Kaempferia pardi K.Larsen & Jenjitt.
- Kaempferia parviflora Wall. ex Baker
- Kaempferia pascuorum Insis.
- Kaempferia philippinensis Merr.
- Kaempferia phuphanensis Saensouk & P.Saensouk
- Kaempferia picheansoonthonii Wongsuwan & Phokham
- Kaempferia pseudoparviflora Saensouk & P.Saensouk
- Kaempferia pulchra Ridl.
- Kaempferia purpurea J.Koenig
- Kaempferia roscoeana Wall.
- Kaempferia rotunda L.
- Kaempferia sakolchaii P.Saensouk, Saensouk & Boonma
- Kaempferia sakonensis Saensouk, P.Saensouk & Boonma
- Kaempferia saraburiensis Picheans.
- Kaempferia sawanensis Picheans. & Koonterm
- Kaempferia siamensis Sirirugsa
- Kaempferia simaoensis Y.Y.Qian
- Kaempferia sipraiana Boonma & Saensouk
- Kaempferia sisaketensis Picheans. & Koonterm
- Kaempferia spoliata Sirirugsa
- Kaempferia subglobosa Noppornch. & Jenjitt.
- Kaempferia takensis Boonma & Saensouk
- Kaempferia udonensis Picheans. & Phokham
- Kaempferia undulata Teijsm. & Binn.
- Kaempferia unifolia Saensouk & P.Saensouk
- Kaempferia uttaraditensis Picheans. & Meechonkit
- Kaempferia xiengkhouangensis Picheans. & Phokham
