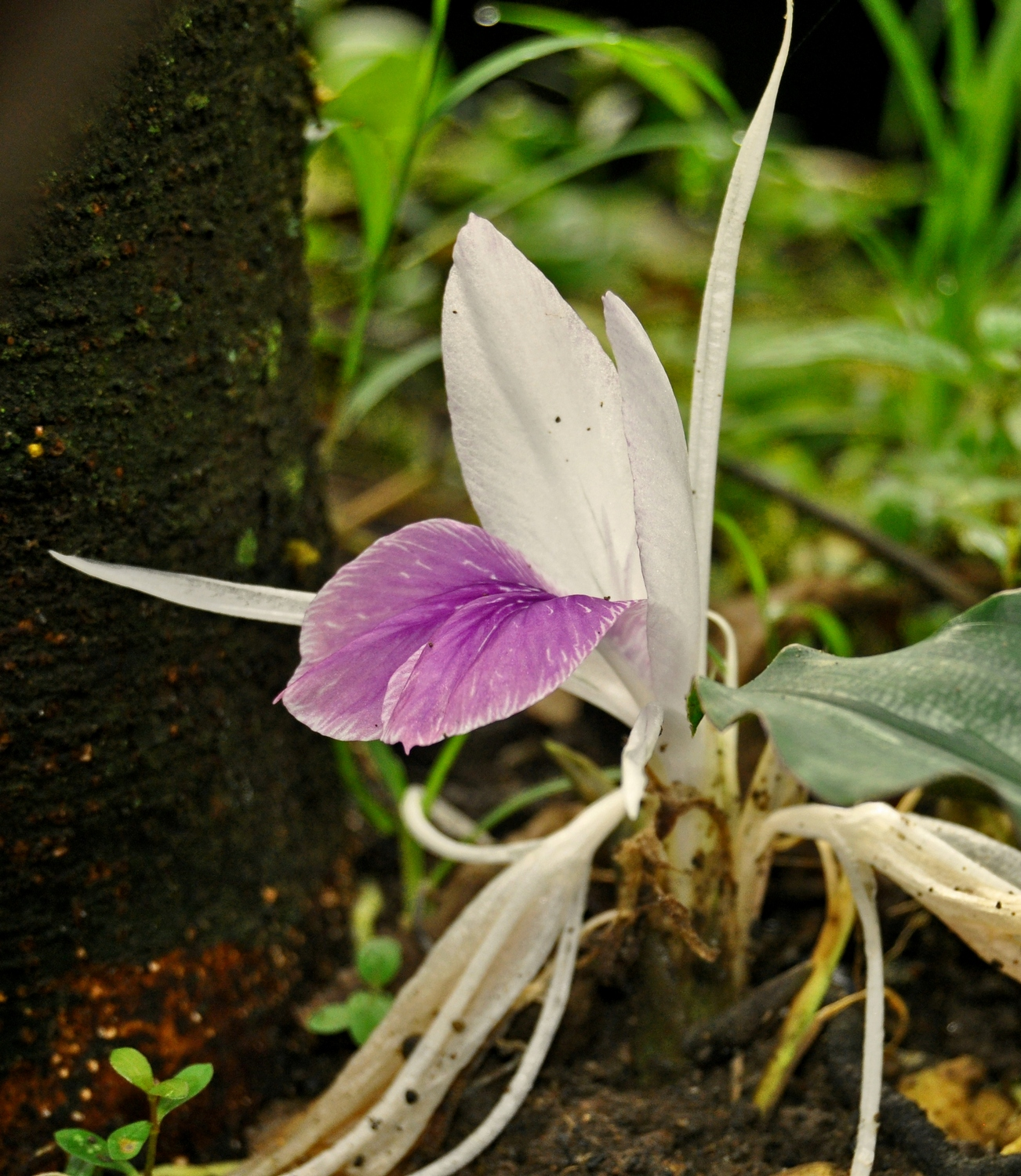

Scientific classification
- Kingdom: Plantae
- Clade: Embryophytes
- Clade: Tracheophytes
- Clade: Angiosperms
- Clade: Monocots
- Clade: Commelinids
- Order: Zingiberales
- Family: Zingiberaceae
- Genus: Kaempferia
- Species: K. rotunda

Binomial name
- Kaempferia rotunda L.

Synonyms
- Kaempferia bhucampac Jones; Zerumbet zeylanica Garsault; Kaempferia longa Jacq.; Kaempferia versicolor Salisb.

= Kaempferia rotunda =

Asian ginger

Species of flowering plant

Kaempferia rotunda, the asian ginger, is a flowering plant species in the ginger family. It is native to China (Guangdong, Guangxi, Hainan, Taiwan, Yunnan), the Indian subcontinent (including Assam, Nepal and Bangladesh), Indochina, and widely cultivated elsewhere. It is reportedly naturalized in Java, Malaysia and Costa Rica.

Kaempferia rotunda is a plant with many medicinal uses in Ayurvedic and allopathic medicinal systems. This plant is also called bhumi champa, Indian crocus, peacock ginger, and round-rooted galangale.

K. rotunda is found in various parts of India and adjoining regions, but rarely in the wild. The plant is grown in small herbal nurseries for applications in medicine preparation. As its Sanskrit name bhumi champa (bloom from within earth) implies, the indigo-coloured flower shoots from within the soil. In fact, the flower emerges much in advance of the whitish leafy shoot. The flower and leaf are never seen at the same time.

The flower contains the toxin benzyl benzoate used to make ointments to treat scabies. It has potential antioxidant effects.
