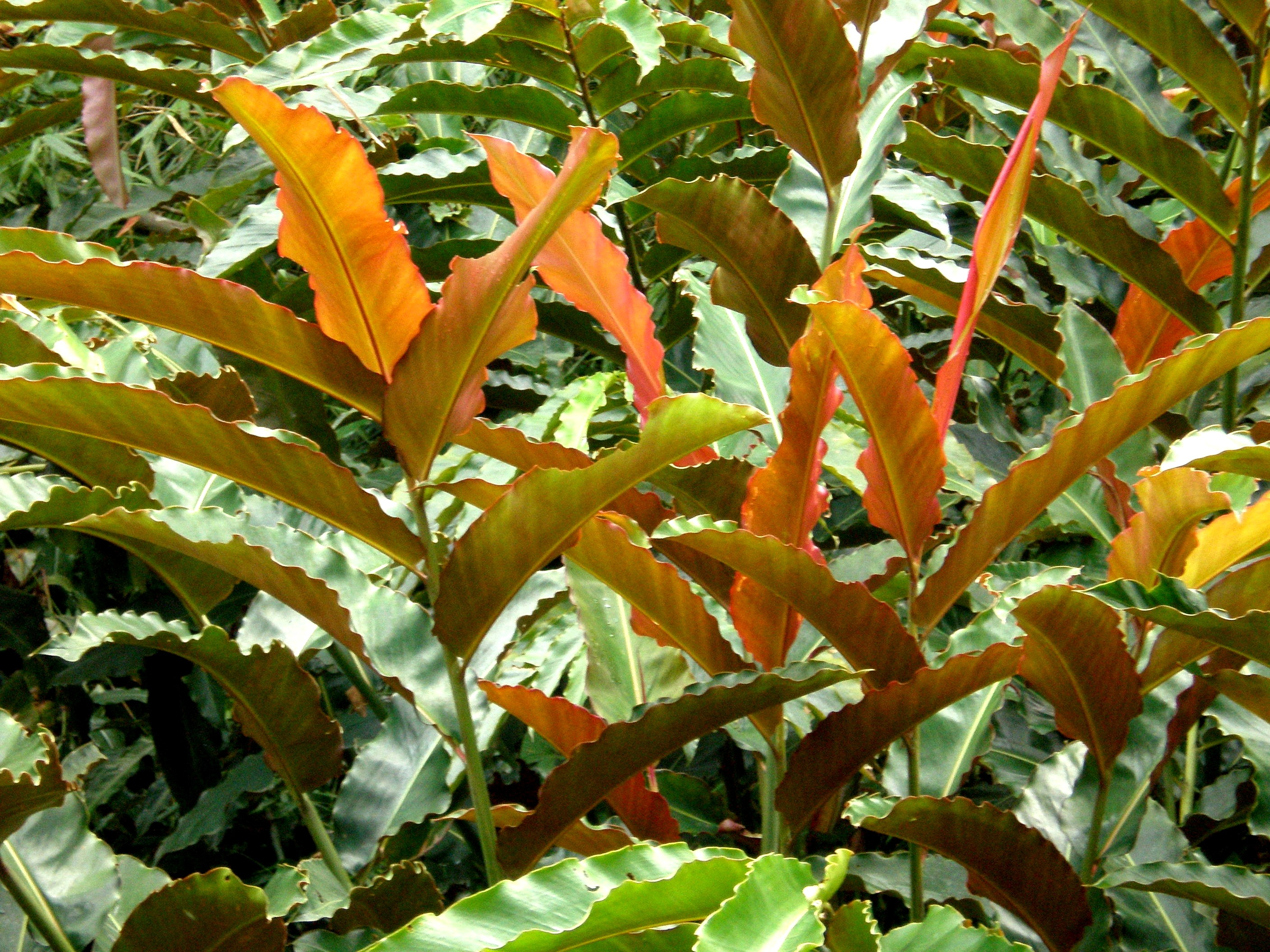

Scientific classification
- Kingdom: Plantae
- Clade: Tracheophytes
- Clade: Angiosperms
- Clade: Monocots
- Clade: Commelinids
- Order: Zingiberales
- Family: Zingiberaceae
- Genus: Etlingera
- Species: E. fulgens

Binomial name
- Etlingera fulgens (Ridl.) C.K.Lim, 2000

Synonyms
- Hornstedtia fulgens, Nicolaia fulgens, Phaeomeria fulgens

= Etlingera fulgens =

Species of flowering plant

Etlingera fulgens is a species of herbaceous perennial plant of the family Zingiberaceae. This species occurs in southern Thailand and peninsular Malaysia. E. fulgens is used as an ornamental plant in landscape gardens for its bright red flowers and young leaves.

== Description ==
Etlingera fulgens can be recognized by its shiny undulating leaves that are dark green in colour. When young, the undersides of its leaves are bright red in color, turning greenish on maturing. In older leaves, only the petiole and midrib are red. Petioles are 1.5–2.0 cm (0.6–0.8 in) in length. Rhizomes, 3 cm (1.2 in) in diameter, occur just below the ground. The plant can grow up to 5 m (16 ft) tall. Crushed leaf sheaths emit a pleasant sour fragrance similar to that of Etlingera elatior. Inflorescences are raised above the ground and infructescences are globular in shape.

== Chemistry ==
Leaves of E. fulgens displayed stronger ferrous ion-chelating ability than young leaves of Camellia sinensis. Chlorogenic acid found in leaves of E. fulgens was higher in content than Lonicera japonica (Japanese honeysuckle), the commercial source. Fruit and rhizome oils of E. fulgens are mainly aliphatic hydrocarbons with cyclododecane, dodecanol, and cyclotetradecane as main constituents. Oils of E. fulgens and E. elatior were very different in composition despite having very similar aroma. Oils of E. fulgens consist mainly of dodecyl acetate (21.6%), an ester, and pentadecanol (14.1%) and hexadecanol (3.60%), both long-chain alcohols.
