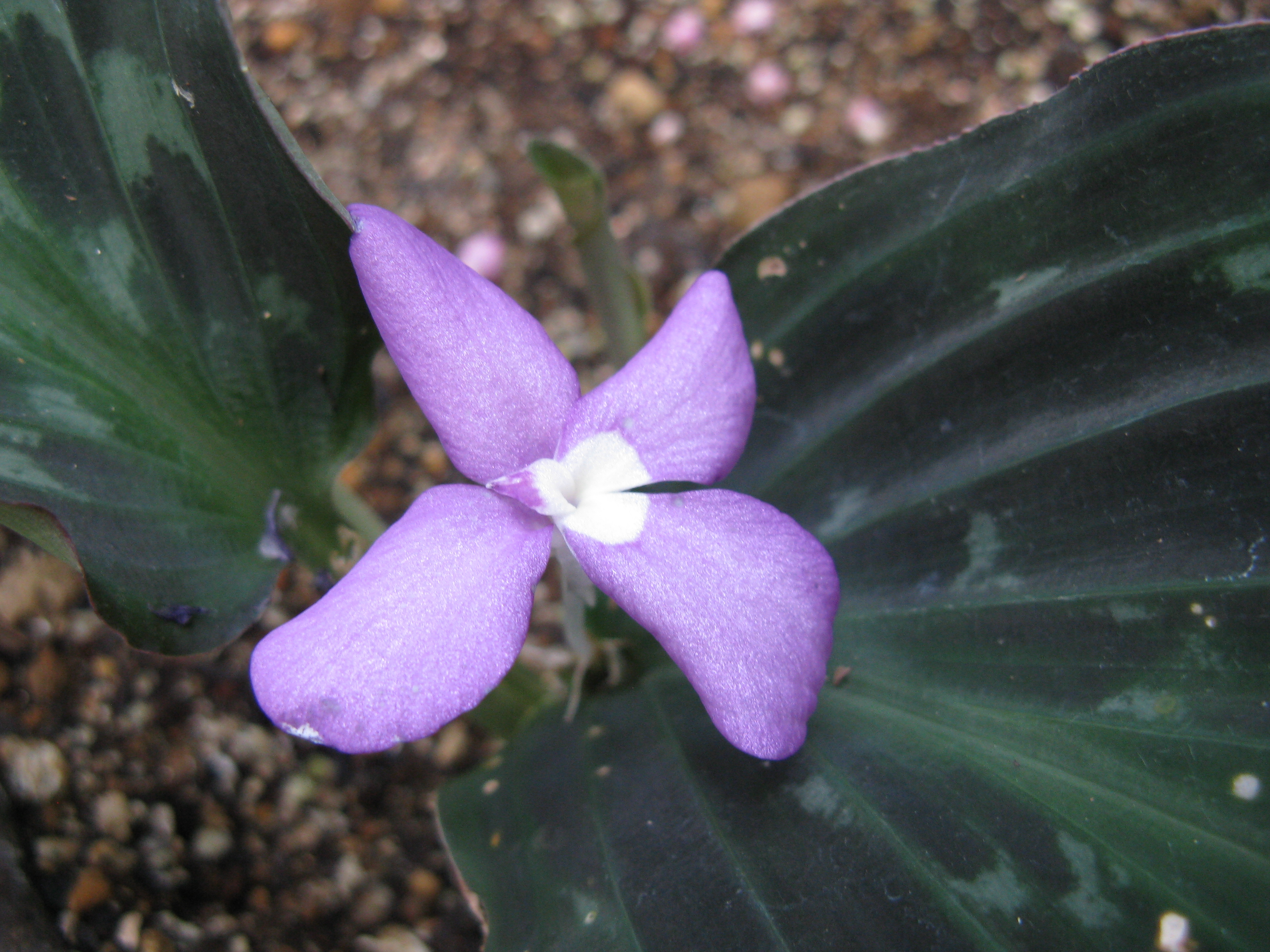
- Kaempferia pulchra in Osaka Prefectural Flowers Garden in Kawachinagano, Osaka, Japan

Scientific classification
- Kingdom: Plantae
- Clade: Tracheophytes
- Clade: Angiosperms
- Clade: Monocots
- Clade: Commelinids
- Order: Zingiberales
- Family: Zingiberaceae
- Genus: Kaempferia
- Species: K. elegans

Binomial name
- Kaempferia elegans (Wall.) Baker

Synonyms
- Kaempferia pulchra Ridl. Monolophus elegans Wall. Kaempferia crawfurdia Wall. ex Horan. Kaempferia atrovirens N.E.Br.

= Kaempferia elegans =

Species of flowering plant

Kaempferia elegans, commonly known as the silver spot, is a shade-loving ginger that has 6" round leaves with three rows of silver spots arranged across them. It has small purple flowers.

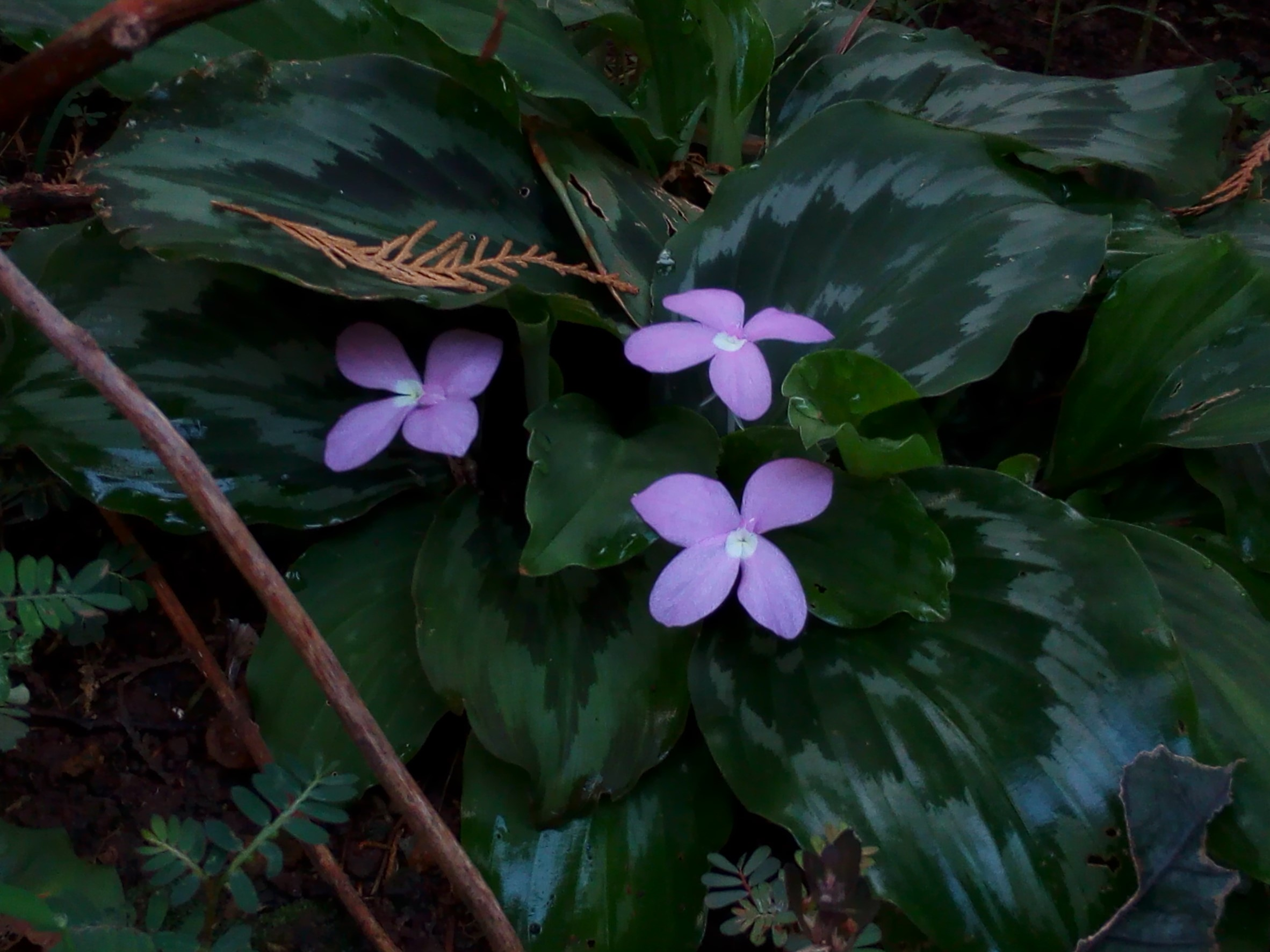
The leaves of Kaempferia elegans have color pattern.
