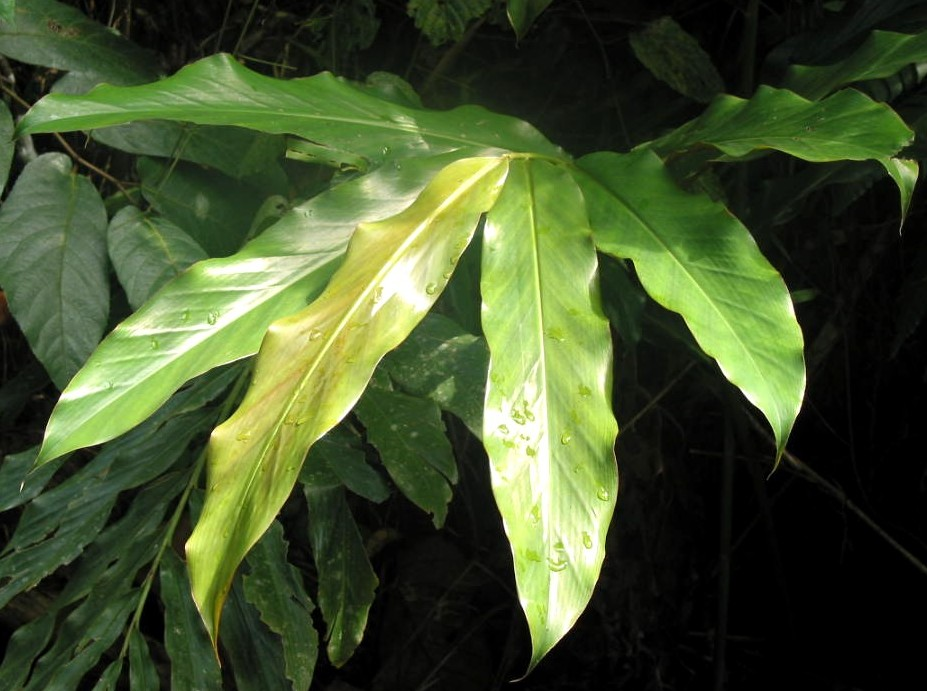

Conservation status
- Least Concern (IUCN 3.1)

Scientific classification
- Kingdom: Plantae
- Clade: Tracheophytes
- Clade: Angiosperms
- Clade: Monocots
- Clade: Commelinids
- Order: Zingiberales
- Family: Zingiberaceae
- Genus: Etlingera
- Species: E. maingayi

Binomial name
- Etlingera maingayi (Baker) R.M.Sm.

Synonyms
- Amomum maingayi Baker; Etlingera maingayi var. longibracteata (Holttum) I.M.Turner; Etlingera maingayi var. ovata C.K.Lim; Hornstedtia maingayi (Baker) Ridl.; Nicolaia maingayi (Baker) K.Larsen; Phaeomeria maingayi (Baker) K.Schum.

= Etlingera maingayi =

Species of plant

Etlingera maingayi, the Malay rose, is a species of herbaceous, perennial, flowering plant in the ginger family, Zingiberaceae. This species occurs in southern Thailand, where its flowers are eaten as vegetables, and Malaysia. It grows along forest edges and in disturbed areas.

== Description ==
Etlingera maingayi grows to less than 2 m (6 ft 7 in) high. Its leaves are variable, with undulating fringes, and emit a sour scent when crushed. Young leaves are translucent and reddish on both sides.

== Chemistry ==
Leaves of E. maingayi displayed ferrous ion chelating ability and lipid peroxidation inhibition activity that were much higher than young leaves of Camellia sinensis. Leaves of E. maingayi had the highest yield of oil (1320 mg/100 g) consisting mainly of lauric acid (45%) and decanoic acid (43%). The unpleasant sour scent of leaves when crushed may be due to these two acids.
