= List of culinary herbs and spices =

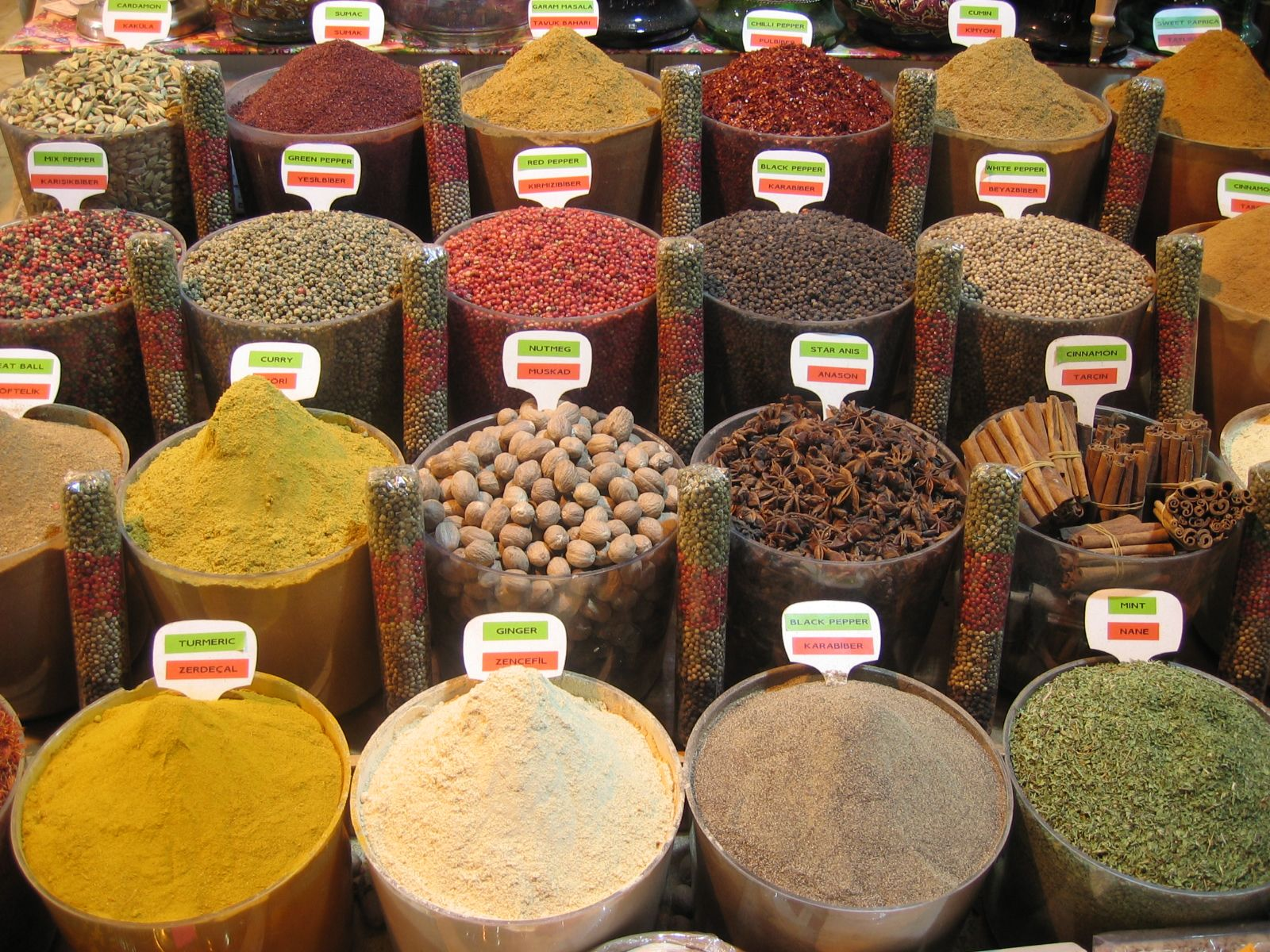
A spice market in Istanbul

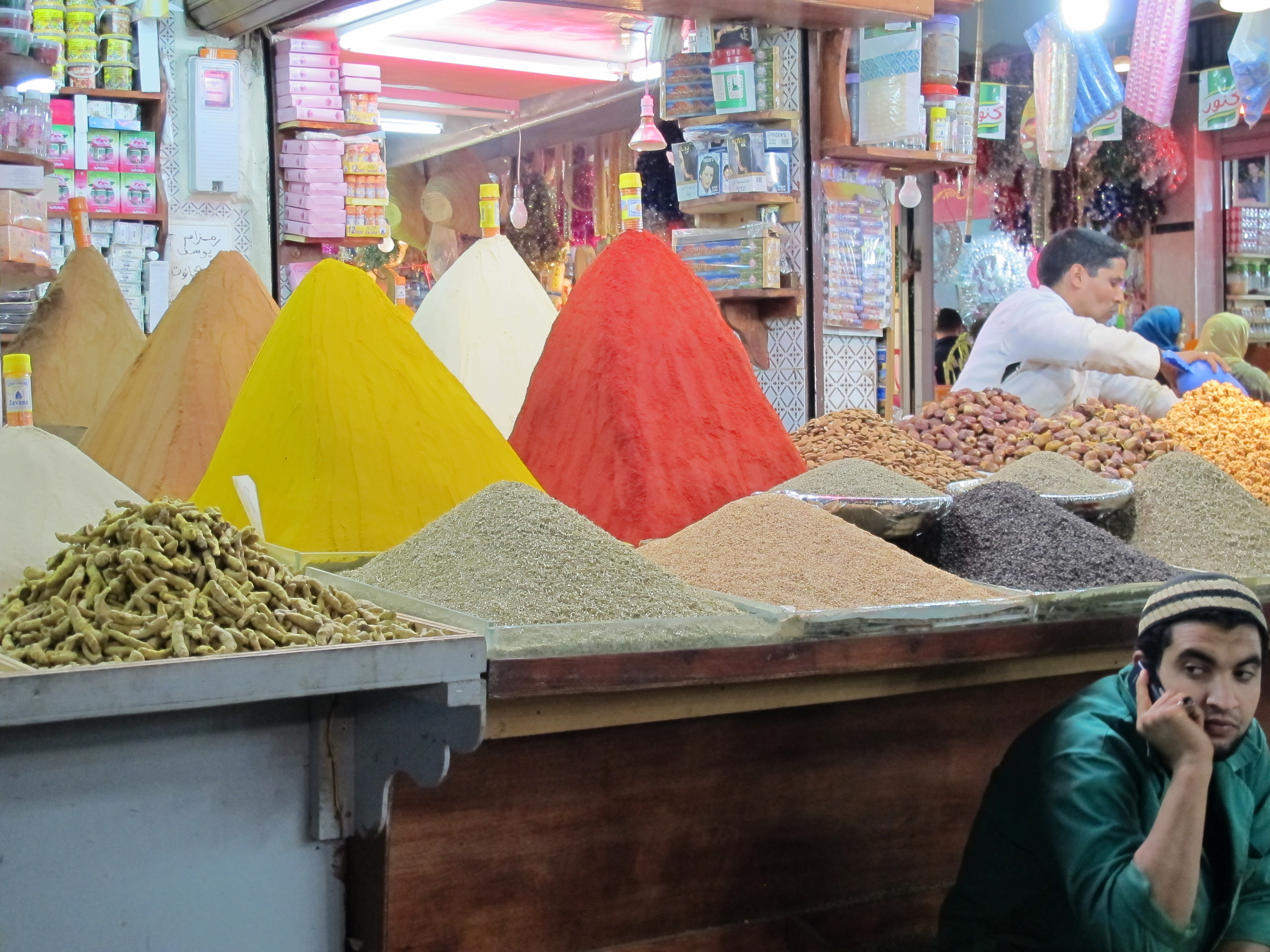
Casablanca's night spice market

This is a list of culinary herbs and spices. Specifically these are food or drink additives of mostly botanical origin used in nutritionally insignificant quantities for flavouring or colouring. Herbs are derived from the leaves and stalks of plants, whereas spices come from the seeds, fruit, roots, and bark of plants. Some plants give rise to both herbs and spices, such as coriander and fenugreek.

This list does not contain fictional plants such as aglaophotis, or recreational drugs such as tobacco. It also excludes plants used primarily for herbal teas or medicinal purposes.

== A ==
- Aidan fruit / Aridan / prekese / uyayak / osakrisa / dawo (Tetrapleura tetraptera)
- Ajwain, carom seeds / thymol seeds / bishop's weed (Trachyspermum ammi) — Pakistan, South Asia, India, Afghanistan, Iran, Egypt, Eritrea & Ethiopia
- Alexanders (Smyrnium olusatrum)
- Alkanet / dyer's alkanet (Alkanna tinctoria) — for red color
- Alligator pepper / hepper pepper / mbongochobi, mbongo spice (Aframomum danielli, A. citratum, or A. exscapum) — West Africa
- Allspice (Pimenta dioica)
- Angelica (Angelica spp.)
  - Angelica / garden angelica / Norwegian angelica / wild celery (Angelica archangelica)
  - Bai zhi / Dahurian angelica (Angelica dahurica)
- Anise (Pimpinella anisum)
  - Aniseed / anise / anix
  - Aniseed myrtle (Syzygium anisatum) — Australia
  - Star anise / badian (Illicium verum) — China
- Annatto (Bixa orellana)
- Artemisia (Artemisia spp.)
  - Absinthe / common wormwood (Artemisia absinthium)
  - Tarragon / estragon (Artemisia dracunculus)
- Asafoetida / hing (Ferula assafoetida)
- Avens (Geum spp.)
  - Wood avens / Herb bennet / St Benedict's herb (Geum urbanum)
- Avocado leaf (Persea americana)

== B ==
- Barberry (Berberis vulgaris and other Berberis spp.)
- Basil (Ocimum spp.)
  - African basil / scent leaf (Ocimum gratissimum)
  - Holy basil (Ocimum tenuiflorum)
  - Lemon Basil (Ocimum × citriodorum)
  - Sweet Basil / great basil (Ocimum basilicum)
  - Thai basil (O. basilicum var. thyrsiflora)
- Bay leaf
  - Bay leaf (Laurus nobilis)
  - Indian bay leaf / tejpat / malabathrum (Cinnamomum tamala)
  - Indonesian bay leaf / Indonesian laurel / Salam leaf / daun salam (Syzygium polyanthum)
  - Mexican bay leaf / laurél (Litsea glaucescens)
  - West Indian bay leaf (Pimenta racemosa)
- Bogbean (Menyanthes trifoliata)
- Boldo (Peumus boldus)
- Borage (Borago officinalis)

== C ==
- California bay laurel (Umbellularia californica)
- Calabash nutmeg / African Calabash nutmeg / ehuru / Jamaican nutmeg / ariwo (Monodora myristica)
- Capers (Capparis spinosa)
  - Caper (flowerbud)
  - Caperberry
- Caraway (Carum carvi)
- Cardamom
  - Black cardamom / badi ilaichi (Amomum subulatum) — India, Pakistan
  - Chinese black cardamom / Cao guo (Lanxangia tsaoko) — China
  - Chinese white cardamom / bai dou kou (Wurfbainia compacta) — China
  - Green cardamom (Elettaria cardamomum) — India
- Celery (Apium graveolens)
  - Celery leaf
  - Celery seed
- Chervil (Anthriscus cerefolium)
- Chicory (Cichorium intybus)
- Chili pepper / chilli / chile (Capsicum spp.)
  - Cayenne pepper / Cayenne chili (Capsicum annuum)
  - Jalapeño (Capsicum annuum cultivar)
  - New Mexico chile (Capsicum annuum) — 'New Mexico Group': Hatch, Anaheim, Big Jim, Chimayó, and Sandia, and other pepper cultivars.
  - Paprika (Capsicum annuum)
- Chironji / charoli nut (Buchanania lanzan)
- Chives (Allium schoenoprasum)
- Cicely / sweet cicely (Myrrhis odorata)
- Cinnamon (Cinnamomum spp.)
  - Cassia / Chinese cinnamon (Cinnamomum cassia)
  - Cinnamon / Ceylon cinnamon / true cinnamon (Cinnamomum verum)
  - Indonesian cinnamon (Cinnamomum burmannii)
  - Cinnamon myrtle (Backhousia myrtifolia) — Australia
  - Vietnamese / Saigon cinnamon (Cinnamomum loureiroi)
  - White cinnamon (Canella winterana) — Caribbean
- Clary / clary sage (Salvia sclarea)
- Clove (Syzygium aromaticum)
- Coriander (Coriandrum sativum)
  - Coriander leaf / coriander greens / cilantro / Chinese parsley
  - Coriander seed
  - Vietnamese coriander (Persicaria odorata)
- Costmary (Tanacetum balsamita)
- Cubeb pepper (Piper cubeba)
- Culangot / culantro / long coriander / recao (Eryngium foetidum)
- Cumin (Cuminum cyminum)
  - Black cumin / Kala zeera / kala jira (Elwendia persica) — South Asia
  - Cumin / white cumin — South Asia
- Curry leaf (Murraya koenigii)
- Curry plant (Helichrysum italicum)
- Cyperus articulatus

== D ==
- Dill (Anethum graveolens)
  - Dill seed
  - Dill weed / dill herb
- Dootsi (Agasyllis latifolia)

== E ==
- Elderflower (Sambucus spp.)
- Epazote / Jesuits' tea / Mexican tea / wormseed (Dysphania ambrosioides)

== F ==
- Fennel (Foeniculum vulgare)
- Fenugreek (Trigonella foenum-graecum)
  - Fenugreek leaf / methi — India, Mediterranean, Middle East
  - Fenugreek seed / methi seed — India, Mediterranean, Middle East
  - Blue fenugreek / blue melilot (Trigonella caerulea)
- Filé powder / gumbo filé (Sassafras albidum) — Creole
- Fingerroot / lesser galangal / temu kuntji / krachai / k'cheay (Boesenbergia rotunda) — Java, Thailand, Cambodia
- Fish mint (Houttuynia cordata)
  - giấp cá / fish mint, leaf — Vietnam
  - zhé ěrgēn / fish mint, rhizome — China: Guangxi, Guizhou, Sichuan, and Yunnan provinces

== G ==
- Galangal (Alpinia spp.)
  - Greater galangal (Alpinia galanga) — Indonesia
  - Lesser galangal (Alpinia officinarum) — Indonesia
  - Sand ginger / kencur / kentjur / shan nai / sha jiang (Kaempferia galanga) — Java, Bali, China
- Garlic (Allium spp.)
  - Garlic (Allium sativum)
  - Garlic chives / Chinese chives / Chinese leek (Allium tuberosum)
- Ginger
  - Ginger (Zingiber officinale)
  - Torch ginger / bunga siantan (Etlingera elatior) — Indonesia
- Golpar / Persian hogweed (Heracleum persicum) — Iran
- Grains of paradise / melegueta pepper (Aframomum melegueta)
- Grains of Selim / Kani pepper / uda (Xylopia aethiopica)

== H ==
- Herb bennet / St Benedict's herb / wood avens (Geum urbanum)
- Hoja santa / hierba santa / acuyo (Piper auritum) — Mexico
- Hops (Humulus lupulus) — European drinks herb: a bitter flavouring agent
- Horseradish (Armoracia rusticana)
- Huacatay / Mexican marigold / mint marigold (Tagetes minuta)
- Hyssop (Hyssopus officinalis)
  - Bible hyssop / Syrian oregano / za'atar / zahtar (Origanum syriacum)
  - Roman hyssop / savory of Crete / pink savory / whorled savory (Satureja thymbra)

== J ==
- Jasmine flowers (Jasminum spp.)
- Jakhya / wild mustard (Cleome viscosa)
- Jalapeño (Capsicum annuum cultivar)
- Jimbu (Allium hypsistum and Allium przewalskianum) — Nepal
- Juniper berry (Juniperus communis) — European drinks herb: an aromatic flavouring agent

== K ==
- Keluak / kluwak / kepayang (Pangium edule) — South-East Asia
- Kinh gioi / Vietnamese balm (Elsholtzia ciliata)
- Kokum (Garcinia indica) — India, a souring agent
- Korarima / Ethiopian cardamom / false cardamom (Aframomum corrorima) — Eritrea
- Koseret leaves (Lippia abyssinica) — Ethiopia
- Kudum Puli / Malabar tamarind (Garcinia gummi-gutta)
- Kutjura (Solanum centrale) — Australia

== L ==
- Lavender (Lavandula spp.)
- Lemon balm (Melissa officinalis)
- Lemon ironbark (Eucalyptus staigeriana) — Australia
- Lemon myrtle (Backhousia citriodora) — Australia
- Lemon verbena (Aloysia citrodora)
- Lemongrass (Cymbopogon spp.)
  - Common lemongrass (Cymbopogon citratus) — South-East Asia
  - Malabar grass (Cymbopogon flexuosus) — South-East Asia
- Kaffir lime leaves / Makrud lime leaves (Citrus hystrix) — South-East Asia
- Leptotes bicolor — Paraguay and southern Brazil
- Lesser calamint / nipitella / nepitella (Clinopodium nepeta) — Italy
- Licorice / liquorice (Glycyrrhiza glabra)
- Litsea cubeba ("mountain pepper"; maqaw)
- Lovage (Levisticum officinale)
  - Lovage leaves
  - Lovage seeds
- Locust beans (Ceratonia siliqua)

== M ==
- Mace (Myristica fragrans)
- Mahleb / mahalepi / St Lucie cherry (Prunus mahaleb)
- Mallow
  - Marsh mallow (Althaea officinalis)
  - Musk mallow / abelmosk (Abelmoschus moschatus)
- Maqaw — see Litsea cubeba
- Marjoram / sweet marjoram / cultivated oregano (Origanum majorana)
- Mastic (Pistacia lentiscus)
- Mint (Mentha spp.) — 25 species, hundreds of varieties
- Moldavian dragonhead (Dracocephalum moldavica)
- Mountain horopito / 'pepper-plant' (Pseudowintera colorata) — New Zealand
- Mustard
  - Mustard, black / mustard seed (Rhamphospermum nigrum)
  - Mustard, brown / mustard seed (Brassica juncea)
  - Mustard, white / mustard seed (Sinapis alba)
  - Mustard, yellow / mustard seed (Sinapis alba)

== N ==
- Nigella / black onion seed / black caraway / kalonji (Nigella sativa)
- Njangsa / djansang (Ricinodendron heudelotii) — West Africa
- Nutmeg (Myristica fragrans)

== O ==
- Oregano (Origanum spp.)
  - Oregano / wild marjoram (Origanum vulgare)
  - Greek / Turkish oregano (Origanum vulgare var. hirtum)
  - Lebanese oregano / Syrian oregano / bible hyssop / za'atar / zahtar (Origanum syriacum)
  - Sweet marjoram (Origanum majorana)
  - Cuban oregano (Coleus amboinicus)
  - Mexican oregano (Lippia graveolens)
- Orris root (Iris germanica and Iris pallida)

== P ==
- Pandan (Pandanus spp.)
  - Pandan flower / fragrant screw-pine / kewra (Pandanus odorifer)
  - Pandan leaf (Pandanus amaryllifolius)
- Pápalo / papaloquelite (Porophyllum ruderale) — Mexico and South America
- Paprika (Capsicum annuum) — q.v. Chili
- Paracress (Acmella oleracea) — Brazil
- Parsley (Petroselinum crispum)
  - French parsley / curly parsley
  - Italian parsley / flat-leaf parsley
  - Japanese parsley (Cryptotaenia japonica)
  - Stone parsley (Sison amomum)
- Passion berry / fringed rue / Tena adam (Ruta chalepensis)
- Pennyroyal / pudding grass (Mentha pulegium)
- Pepper (true and so-called)
  - Ashanti pepper / uziza / Edo Pepper / Guinea cubeb (Piper guineense)
  - Pepper, black, white, and green (Piper nigrum)
  - Brazilian pepper / pink pepper (Schinus terebinthifolius)
  - Dorrigo pepper (Tasmannia stipitata) — Australia
  - Kani pepper / uda / Grains of Selim (Xylopia aethiopica)
  - Long pepper (Piper longum)
  - Melegueta pepper / Grains of paradise (Aframomum melegueta)
  - Mountain pepper / Cornish pepper leaf (Tasmannia lanceolata)
  - Peruvian pepper (Schinus molle)
  - Szechuan pepper (Zanthoxylum spp. including Z. bungeanum, Z. schinifolium, and Z. armatum) — China
  - Tasmanian pepper (Tasmannia lanceolata)
  - Voatsiperifery (Piper borbonense) — Madagascar
- Peppermint (Mentha piperata) — q.v. Mint
- Peppermint gum leaf (Eucalyptus dives)
- Perilla (Perilla frutescens)
  - Korean perilla seeds / Deulkkae
  - Korean perilla leaves / Kkaennip
  - Japanese perilla leaves / Shiso (Perilla frutescens var. crispa)
- Pipicha / straight-leaf pápalo (Porophyllum linaria) — Mexico
- Poppy seed (Papaver somniferum)
- Purslane (Portulaca oleracea)

== Q ==
- Quassia (Quassia amara) — a bitter spice in aperitifs and fortified wines along with a few beers

== R ==
- Red rice powder (Monascus purpureus) — China
- Rice paddy herb (Limnophila aromatica) — Vietnam
- Rosemary (Salvia rosmarinus)
- Rue (Ruta spp.)
  - Common rue / herb-of-grace (Ruta graveolens)

== S ==
- Safflower (Carthamus tinctorius) — only for yellow color
- Saffron (Crocus sativus)
  - Use of saffron
- Sage (Salvia officinalis)
- Salad burnet (Sanguisorba minor)
- Sassafras (Sassafras albidum)
- Savory (Satureja spp.)
  - Summer savory (Satureja hortensis)
  - Winter savory (Satureja montana)
- Sesame (Sesamum spp.)
  - Black sesame seeds (Sesamum radiatum)
  - White sesame seeds / benne (Sesamum indicum)
- Sha ren (Wurfbainia villosa) — China
- Silphium / silphion / laser / laserpicium / sorado (unidentified and likely extinct Ferula species) — Ancient Roman cuisine, Ancient Greek cuisine
- Sorrel (Rumex spp.)
  - Common sorrel / spinach dock (Rumex acetosa)
  - Sheep sorrel / field sorrel / red sorrel (Rumex acetosella)
  - Garden sorrel / wrinkled sorrel (Rumex rugosus)
- Spearmint (Mentha spicata) — q.v. Mint
- Spikenard / muskroot (Nardostachys grandiflora or N. jatamansi)
- Star anise (Illicium verum) — q.v. Aniseed
- Strawberry Gum (Eucalyptus olida) — Australia
- Sumac (Rhus spp.)
  - Sicilian sumac (Rhus coriaria)
- Sweet woodruff / sweet-scented bed-straw (Galium odoratum)

== T ==
- Tarragon / estragon (Artemisia dracunculus) — q.v. Artemisia
- Tasmannia lanceolata
- Thyme (Thymus spp.)
  - Common thyme (Thymus vulgaris)
  - Creeping thyme (Thymus praecox)
  - Lavender thyme (Thymus thracicus)
  - Lemon thyme (Thymus citriodorus)
  - Wild thyme (Thymus serpyllum)
  - Woolly thyme (Thymus pseudolanuginosus)
- Tonka beans (Dipteryx odorata)
- Turkey berries / pendejera (Solanum torvum)
- Turmeric (Curcuma longa)

== V ==
- Vanilla (Vanilla planifolia)
- Voatsiperifery (Piper borbonense) — Madagascar — q.v. Pepper

== W ==
- Wasabi / Japanese horseradish (Wasabia japonica)
- Water-pepper / smartweed (Polygonum hydropiper)
- Wattleseed (Acacia — over 120 spp.)
  - Sandplain wattleseed / Murray's wattle / powder bark wattle (Acacia murrayana)
  - Elegant wattleseed / prickly wattle / gundabluey (Acacia victoriae)
- Wintergreen (Gaultheria spp.)
  - Boxberry / eastern teaberry / American wintergreen (Gaultheria procumbens)
  - Fragrant wintergreen (Gaultheria fragrantissima)
  - Slender wintergreen / Oregon spicy wintergreen / western teaberry (Gaultheria ovatifolia)
- Wood avens / herb bennet (Geum urbanum)
- Woodruff — q.v. Sweet woodruff
- Wormwood / absinthe (Artemisia absinthium) — q.v. Artemisia

== Y ==
- Yerba buena, any of several different species primarily in the mint family — q.v. Mint
- Yarrow (Achillea millefolium)

== Z ==
- Za'atar (a blend of herbs from the genera Origanum, Calamintha, Thymus, and Satureja) - The Levant
- Zedoary (Curcuma zedoaria)
- Zicao / red stoneroot / red gromwell (Lithospermum erythrorhizon) — for red color

== See also ==
- Bushfood spices
- Curry powder / Garam masala
- Food grading of spices
- Herbs
- List of basil cultivars
- List of Capsicum cultivars
- List of dried foods
- List of food origins
- List of smoked spices
- List of spices used in root beer
- List of foods
- Seasoning
- Spice Bazaar, Istanbul
- Spice mix
- Spice use in Antiquity

=== Culinary herbs and spices by country, region and culture ===
- African spices
  - Moroccan spices
  - Nigerien spices
- American spices
  - Aztec spices
  - Chilean herbs and spices
  - List of Puerto Rican spices and seasonings
- South Asian spices
  - Assamese spices
  - List of Bangladeshi spices
  - List of Gujarati spices
  - List of Indian spices
  - List of Pakistani spices
  - Sri Lankan spices
- South-East Asian spices
  - List of Indonesian bumbu spices
  - Indonesian spices
  - List of Indonesian spices
  - Manado spices
  - Thai herbs and spices
  - List of Thai herbs and spices
  - Vietnamese herbs and spices
  - List of Vietnamese spices and herbs
- List of Australian herbs and spices
- European spices
  - European Medieval spices
  - List of Armenian spices and herbs
  - Bulgarian spices
  - Hungarian spices
  - List of Italian herbs and spices
  - Lithuanian spices
