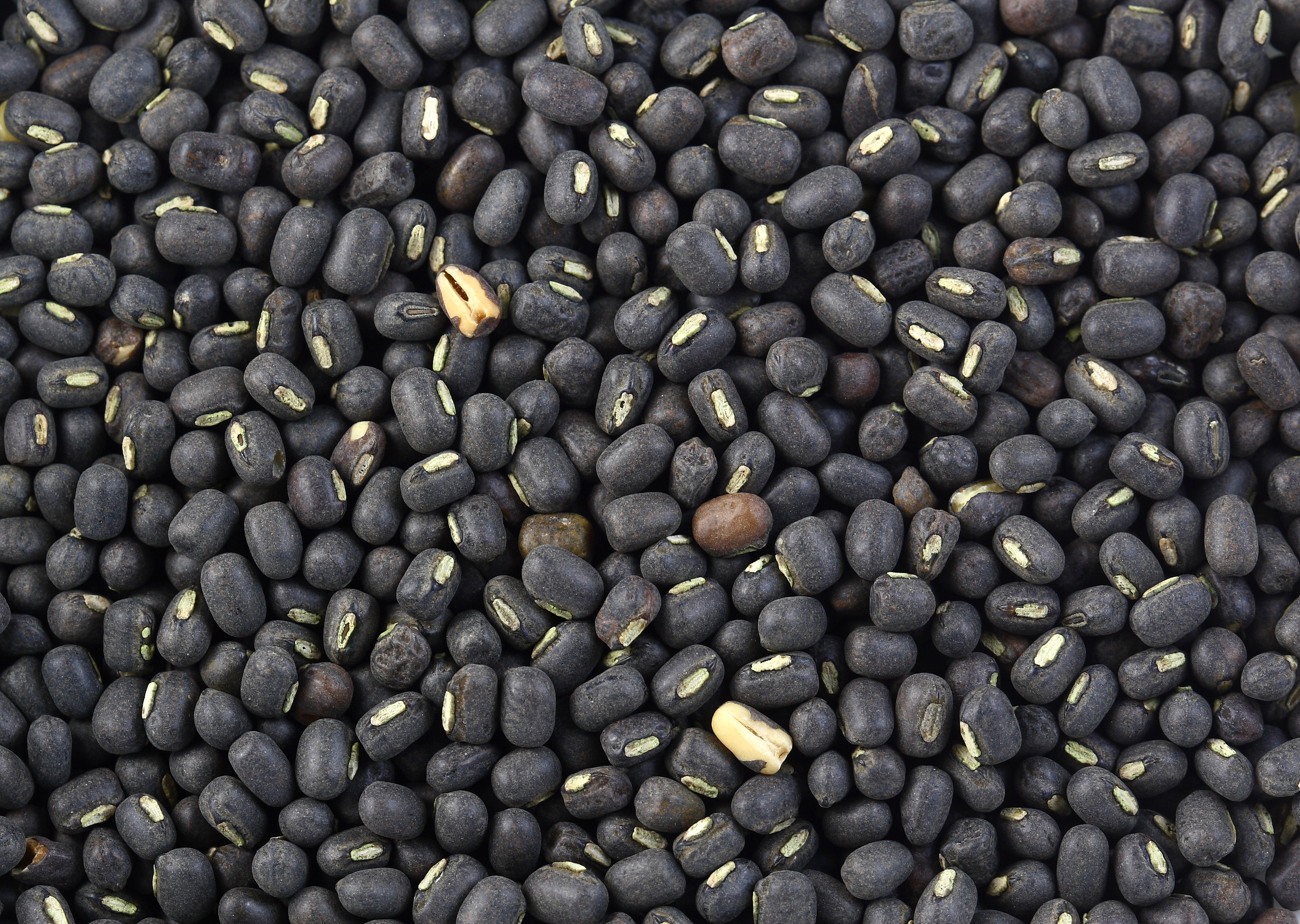
- Dry black gram

Scientific classification
- Kingdom: Plantae
- Clade: Embryophytes
- Clade: Tracheophytes
- Clade: Spermatophytes
- Clade: Angiosperms
- Clade: Eudicots
- Clade: Rosids
- Order: Fabales
- Family: Fabaceae
- Subfamily: Faboideae
- Genus: Vigna
- Species: V. mungo

Binomial name
- Vigna mungo (L.) Hepper

Synonyms
- Azukia mungo (L.) Masam.; Phaseolus hernandezii Savi; Phaseolus mungo L.; Phaseolus roxburghii Wight & Arn.

= Vigna mungo =

Species of plant

The black gram (Note: Also known as the urad bean, urid bean, minapa pappu, black matpe, matimah, matikolai, mash kalai, maas/kalo daal, uzhunnu/ulundu parippu, or uddu) (Vigna mungo) is a bean grown in South Asia. Like its relative the mung bean, it has been reclassified from the genus Phaseolus to Vigna. The product sold as black gram is usually the whole bean, whereas the split bean (the interior being white) is called white lentil. It should not be confused with the much smaller true black lentil (Lens culinaris).

Black gram originated in South Asia, where it has been in cultivation from ancient times. It is very widely used in South Asian cuisine. In India the black gram is one of the important pulses grown in both kharif and rabi seasons. This crop is extensively grown in the southern part of India and the northern part of Bangladesh and Nepal. In Nepal it is known as maas and mash daal in Bangladesh. It is a popular daal (legume) side dish in South Asia that goes with curry and rice as a platter. Black gram has also been introduced to other tropical areas, such as the Caribbean, Fiji, Mauritius, Myanmar and Africa, mainly by Indian immigrants during the Indian indenture system.

== Description ==
It is an erect, suberect or trailing, densely hairy, annual bush. The tap root produces a branched root system with smooth, rounded nodules. The pods are narrow, cylindrical and up to 6 centimetres (2 1/4 in) long. The plant grows 30–100 cm (12–39 in) tall with large hairy leaves and 4–6 cm seed pods.

== Taxonomy ==
While the black gram was, along with the green gram, originally placed in Phaseolus, it has since been transferred to Vigna.

=== Varieties ===
Pant Urd 31 (PU-31) Lam Black Gram 884 (LBG 884) Trombay Urd (TU 40)

- Pant U-13
- JU-2
- Type-9
- Barkha
- Gwalior-2

Mutant varieties:CO-1 and Sarla. Spring season varieties:Prabha and AKU-4. First black gram variety developed in – T9(1948).

== Nutrition ==
Mungo beans, mature seeds, raw
Nutritional value per 100 g (3.5 oz)
- Energy: 1,427 kJ (341 kcal)
- Carbohydrates: 58.99
- Sugars: 0
- Dietary fiber: 18.3
- Fat: 1.64 g
- Protein: 25.21
Vitamins and minerals
Vitamins	Quantity %DV^{†}
Thiamine (B1)	23% 0.273 mg
Riboflavin (B2)	20% 0.254 mg
Niacin (B3)	9% 1.447 mg
Pantothenic acid (B5)	0% 0.0 mg
Vitamin B6	17% 0.281 mg
Folate (B9)	157% 628 μg
Choline	0% 0 mg
Vitamin C	0% 0 mg
Vitamin E	0% 0 mg
Vitamin K	0% 0 μg
Minerals	Quantity %DV^{†}
Calcium	11% 138 mg
Iron	42% 7.57 mg
Magnesium	64% 267 mg
Manganese	0% 0 mg
Phosphorus	30% 379 mg
Potassium	33% 983 mg
Sodium	2% 38 mg
Zinc	30% 3.35 mg
- Other constituents: Quantity
- Water: 10.8
- Link to USDA Database entry
- ^{†}Percentages estimated using US recommendations for adults, except for potassium, which is estimated based on expert recommendation from the National Academies.

It contains high levels of protein (25 g/100 g dry weight), potassium (983 mg/100 g), calcium (138 mg/100 g), iron (7.57 mg/100 g), niacin (1.447 mg/100 g), thiamine (0.273 mg/100 g), and riboflavin (0.254 mg/100 g). Black gram complements the essential amino acids provided in most cereals and plays an important role in the diets of the people of Nepal and India. Black gram is also very high in folate (628 μg/100 g raw, 216 μg/100 g cooked).

== Uses ==
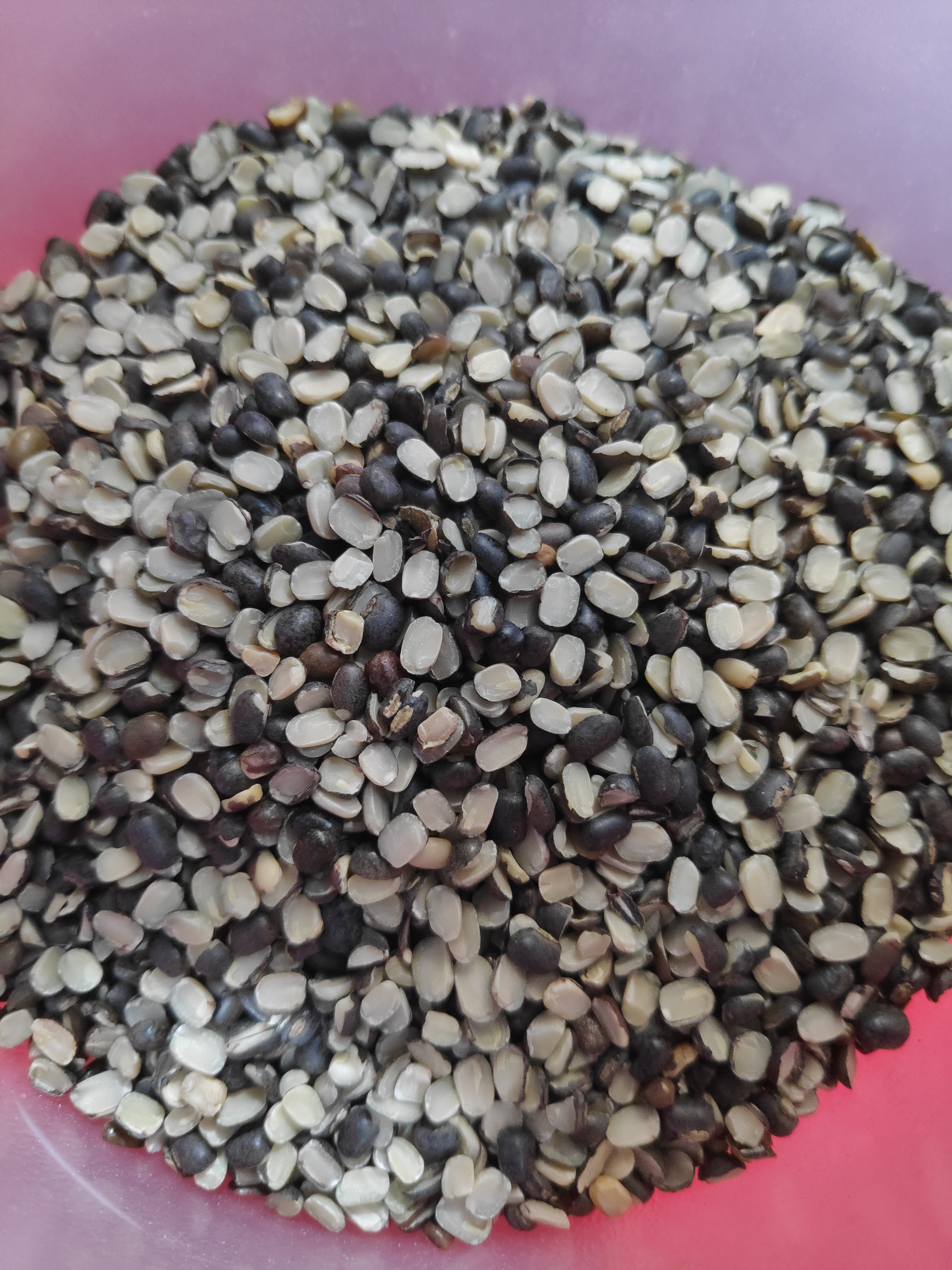
Dry split black gram.

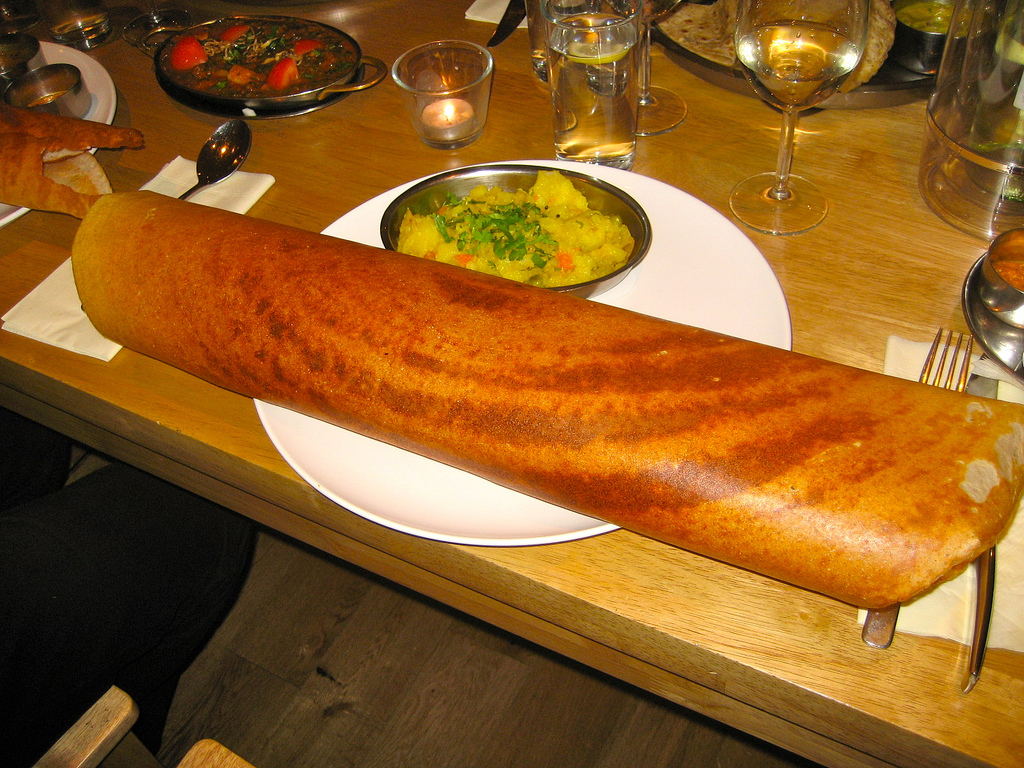
Crispy masala dosa made from batter

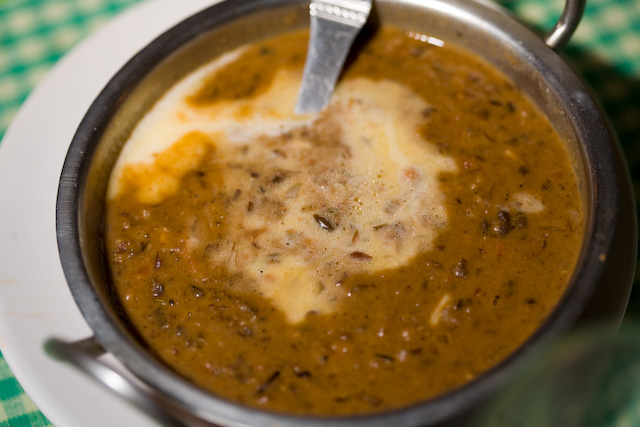
Dal makhani, a popular Indian dish with Vigna mungo as its main ingredient

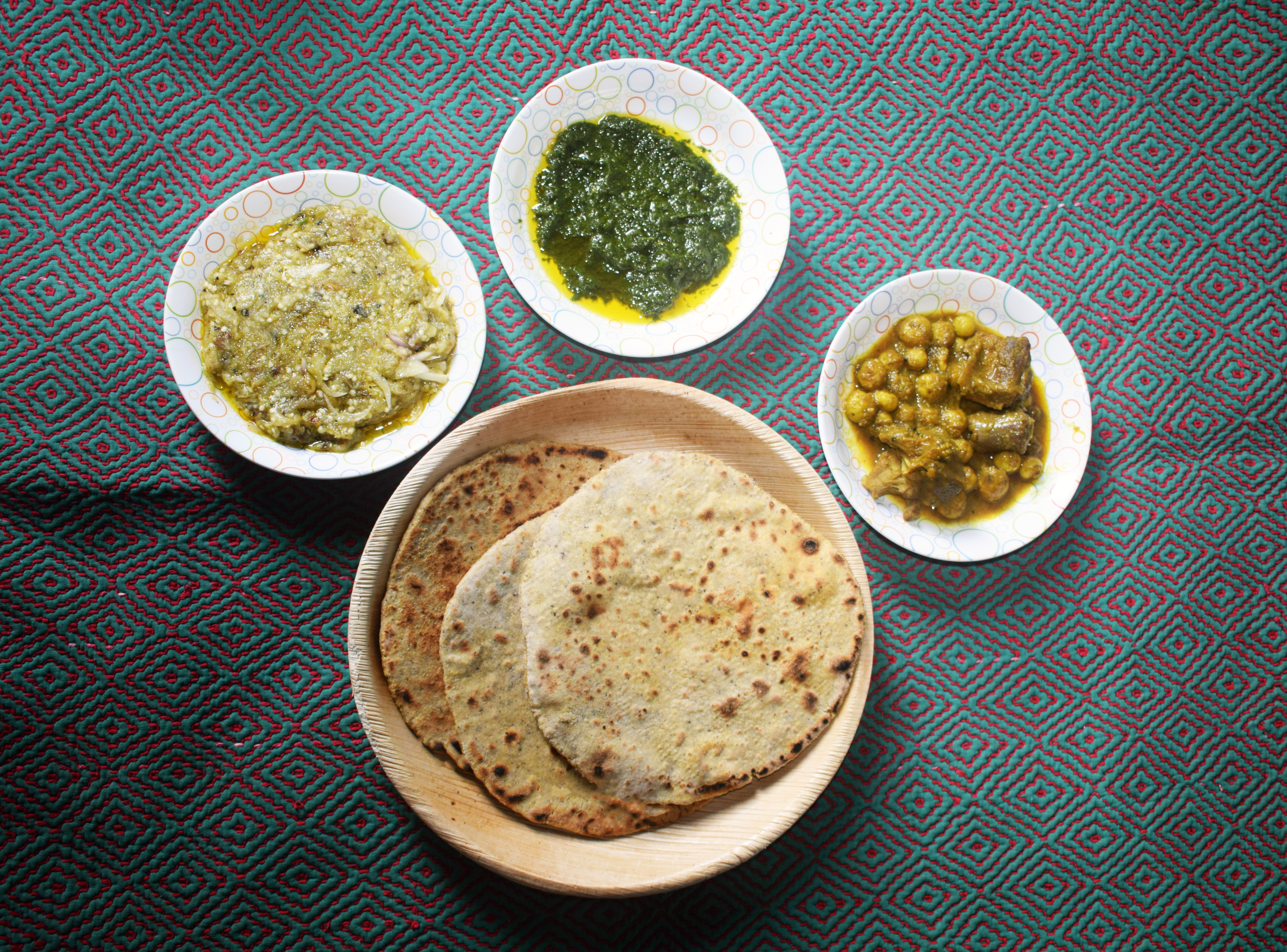
Kalai ruti, breakfast served with different vortas and chicken curry in Rajshahi, Bangladesh

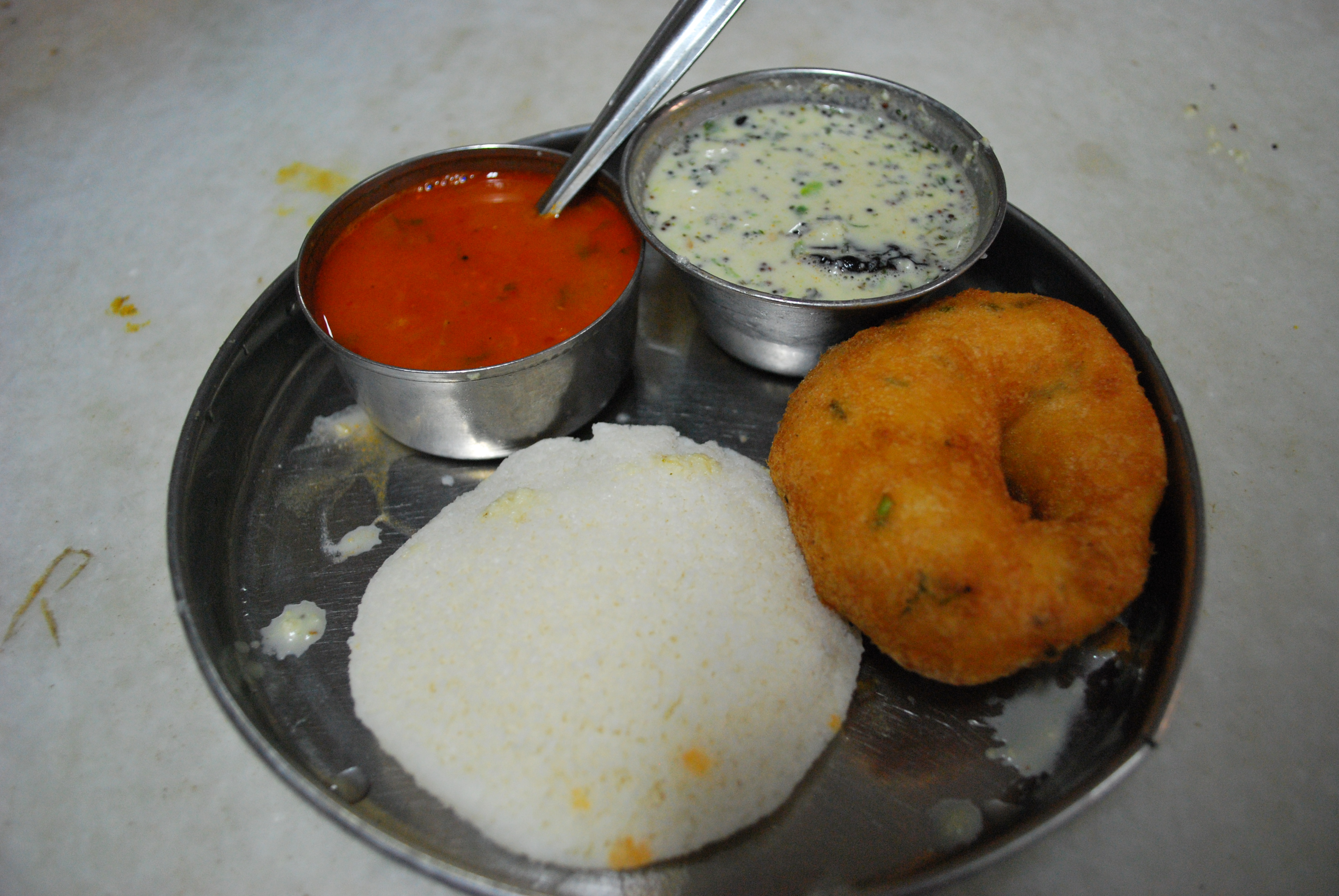
Idli and medu vada, a very common breakfast in South India

In Nepal, 'maas ko dal' is an important part of the staple food Dal bhat where it is cooked in an iron pot (falaam ko tapke - फलाम को ताप्के) by simmering slowly, spiced with jimbu and tempered with ghee (jhaneko) giving it an authentic rich flavor.

Vigna mungo is popular in Northern India, largely used to make dal from the whole or split, dehusked seeds. The bean is boiled and eaten whole or, after splitting, made into dal; prepared like this it has an unusual mucilaginous texture.

Its usage is quite common in Dogra Cuisine of Jammu and Lower Himachal region. The key ingredient of Dal Maddhra or Maah Da Maddhra dish served in Dogri Dhaam of Jammu is Vigna mungo lentil. Similarly, another dish Teliya Maah popular in Jammu & Kangra uses this lentil. Traditionally, Vigna mungo is used for preparing Dogra-style khichdi during Panj Bhikham and Makar Sankranti festival in Jammu and Lower Himachal. Fermented Vigna mungo paste is also used to prepare Lakhnapuri Bhalle or Lakhanpuri Laddu (a popular street food of Jammu region).

In Uttarakhandi cuisine, Vigna mungo is used for preparing traditional dish called Chainsu or Chaisu.

In North Indian cuisine, it is used as an ingredient of Dal makhani, which is a modern restaurant style adaptation of Traditional Sabut Urad Dal of Northern India.

In Bengal, it is used in kalai ruti, biulir dal. In Rajasthan, It is one of the ingredients of Panchmel dal which is usually consumed with bati. In Pakistan, it is called Dhuli Mash ki daal and used to make laddu Pethi walay and Bhalla.

It is also extensively used in South Indian culinary preparations. Black gram is one of the key ingredients in making idli and dosa batter, in which one part of black gram is mixed with three or four parts of idli rice to make the batter. Vada or udid vada also contain black gram and are made from soaked batter and deep-fried in cooking oil. The dough is also used in making papadum, in which white lentils are usually used.

In the Telugu states, it is eaten as a sweet in the form of laddoos called Sunnundallu or Minapa.

=== Other uses ===
In medieval India, this bean was used in a technique to facilitate making crucibles impermeable.

== Names ==
Vigna mungo is known by various names across South and Southeast Asia. Its name in most languages of India derives from Proto-Dravidian *uẓ-untu-, borrowed into Sanskrit as uḍida:

- Caribbean Hindustani/Fiji Hindi: उरदी दाल (urdi dāl)
- Gujarati: અળદ (aḷad), અડદ (aḍad)
- Hindi: उड़द दाल (uṛad dāl), उरद दाल (urad dāl)
- Kannada: ಉದ್ದು (uddu), ಉದ್ದಿನ ಬೇಳೆ (uddina bēḷe)
- Marathi/Konkani: उडीद (uḍid)
- Sinhala : උඳු (undu)
- Malayalam: ഉഴുന്ന് (uẓhunnu)
- Tamil: உளுந்து (uḷuntu/uḷundu), உளுத்தம்பருப்பு (uḷutham paruppu)
- Telugu: మినుములు (minumulu) and ఉద్ది పాప్పు (uddi pappu) in Rayalaseema dialect
- Tulu: ಉರ್ದು ಸಲೈ (urdu salāyi)

Its name in selected Indic languages, however, derives from Sanskrit masa (माष) :

- Dogri: 𑠢𑠬𑠪𑠹 𑠛𑠮 𑠛𑠬𑠥 / माह् दी दाल (māh di dāl)
- Assamese: মাটিমাহ (mātimāh), মাটিকলাই (mātikolāi)
- Bengali: মাসকালাই ডাল (mashkālāi ḍāl)
- Nepali: कालो दाल (kālo dāl ), मास (mās)
- Punjabi : ਮਾਂਹ / ਮਾਸ਼ ਦੀ ਦਾਲ (mãha/māsh di dāl)
- Urdu: ماش کی دال (māsh ki dāl)

Other names include:

- Odia: ବିରି ଡାଲି (biri ḍāli)
- Meitei: ꯁꯒꯣꯜ ꯍꯋꯥꯏ (sagol hawāi)
- Myanmar: မတ်ပဲ (matpe)
- Vietnamese: (đậu muồng ăn)
- Thai: ถั่วเขียวผิวดำ/ถั่วแขก (thua kiew piw dam/thua kaek)

== See also ==
- Chakuli pitha
- Dahi vada
- Uttapam
