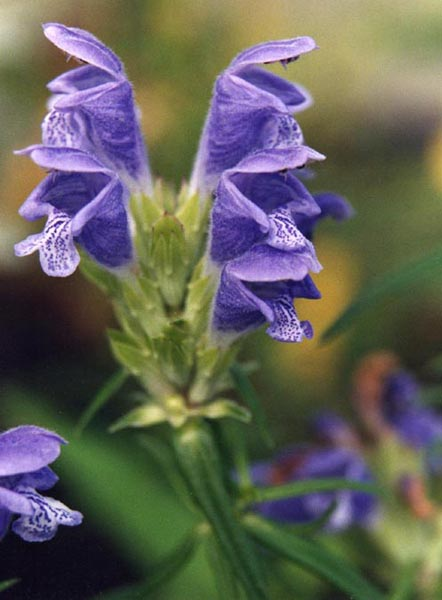
- Dracocephalum ruyschiana

Scientific classification
- Kingdom: Plantae
- Clade: Tracheophytes
- Clade: Angiosperms
- Clade: Eudicots
- Clade: Asterids
- Order: Lamiales
- Family: Lamiaceae
- Subfamily: Nepetoideae
- Tribe: Mentheae
- Genus: Dracocephalum; L. (1753)

Synonyms
- Cephaloma Neck. (1790), opus utique oppr.; Dracontocephalium Hassk. (1844); Fedtschenkiella Kudr. (1941); Hyssopus L. (1753); Lallemantia Fisch. & C.A.Mey. (1840); Moldavica Fabr. (1759); Ruyschia Fabr. (1759), nom. superfl.; Ruyschiana Mill. (1754)

= Dracocephalum =

Genus of flowering plants

Dracocephalum is a genus of flowering plants in the family Lamiaceae, native to temperate regions of the Northern Hemisphere. These flowers, collectively called dragonhead, are annual or perennial herbaceous plants or subshrubs, growing to 15 to 90 centimeters tall. The genus has 89 species as currently circumscribed, which includes the formerly separate genera Hyssopus, Lallemantia, and others. Older circumscriptions include 60 to 70 species.

== Species ==
Plants of the World Online accepts 89 species.

- Dracocephalum adylovii I.I.Malzev
- Dracocephalum aitchisonii Rech.f.
- Dracocephalum argunense Fisch. ex Link
- Dracocephalum aucheri Boiss.
- Dracocephalum austriacum L.
- Dracocephalum baldshuanicum (Gontsch.) A.L.Budantzev
- Dracocephalum bipinnatum Rupr.
- Dracocephalum botryoides Steven
- Dracocephalum breviflorum Turrill
- Dracocephalum bullatum Forrest ex Diels
- Dracocephalum butkovii Krassovsk.
- Dracocephalum calophyllum Hand.-Mazz.
- Dracocephalum canescens L.
- Dracocephalum charkeviczii Prob.
- Dracocephalum cuspidatum (Boriss.) Y.P.Chen & B.T.Drew
- Dracocephalum discolor Bunge
- Dracocephalum diversifolium Rupr.
- Dracocephalum ferganicum Lazkov
- Dracocephalum foetidum Bunge
- Dracocephalum formosum Gontsch.
- Dracocephalum forrestii W.W.Sm.
- Dracocephalum fragile Turcz. ex Benth.
- Dracocephalum fruticulosum Steph. ex Willd.
- Dracocephalum ghahremanii Jamzad
- Dracocephalum grandiflorum L.
- Dracocephalum heterophyllum Benth.
- Dracocephalum hoboksarensis G.J.Liu
- Dracocephalum ibericum M.Bieb.
- Dracocephalum imberbe Bunge
- Dracocephalum imbricatum C.Y.Wu & W.T.Wang
- Dracocephalum integrifolium Bunge
- Dracocephalum isabellae Forrest ex W.W.Sm.
- Dracocephalum jacutense Peschkova
- Dracocephalum junatovii A.L.Budantsev
- Dracocephalum kafiristanicum Bornm.
- Dracocephalum komarovii Lipsky
- Dracocephalum kotschyi Boiss.
- Dracocephalum krylovii Lipsky
- Dracocephalum latilabiatum (C.Y.Wu & H.W.Li) Y.P.Chen & B.T.Drew
- Dracocephalum lindbergii Rech.f.
- Dracocephalum longipedicellatum Muschl.
- Dracocephalum macranthum (Boriss.) Y.P.Chen & B.T.Drew
- Dracocephalum microflorum C.Y.Wu & W.T.Wang
- Dracocephalum microphyton Y.P.Chen, Y.S.Chen & C.L.Xiang
- Dracocephalum moldavica L. (type)
- Dracocephalum multicaule Montbret & Aucher ex Benth.
- Dracocephalum multicolor Kom.
- Dracocephalum nodulosum Rupr.
- Dracocephalum nuratavicum Adylov
- Dracocephalum nuristanicum Rech.f. & Edelb.
- Dracocephalum nutans L.
- Dracocephalum oblongifolium Regel
- Dracocephalum officinalis (L.) Y.P.Chen & B.T.Drew – hyssop
- Dracocephalum olchonense Peschkova
- Dracocephalum origanoides Steph. ex Willd.
- Dracocephalum palmatoides C.Y.Wu & W.T.Wang
- Dracocephalum palmatum Steph. ex Willd.
- Dracocephalum parviflorum Nutt.
- Dracocephalum paulsenii Briq.
- Dracocephalum peltatum L.
- Dracocephalum peregrinum L.
- Dracocephalum pinnatum L.
- Dracocephalum polychaetum Bornm.
- Dracocephalum popovii T.V.Egorova & Sipliv.
- Dracocephalum propinquum W.W.Sm.
- Dracocephalum psammophilum C.Y.Wu & W.T.Wang
- Dracocephalum purdomii W.W.Sm.
- Dracocephalum renati Emb.
- Dracocephalum rigidulum Hand.-Mazz.
- Dracocephalum royleanum Benth.
- Dracocephalum rupestre Hance
- Dracocephalum ruyschiana L.
- Dracocephalum sajanense Stepanov
- Dracocephalum schischkinii Strizhova
- Dracocephalum scrobiculatum Regel
- Dracocephalum seravschanicum (Dubj.) Y.P.Chen & B.T.Drew
- Dracocephalum spinulosum Popov
- Dracocephalum stamineum Kar. & Kir.
- Dracocephalum stellerianum Hiltebr.
- Dracocephalum subcapitatum (Kuntze) Lipsky
- Dracocephalum subulifolium (Rech.f.) Y.P.Chen & B.T.Drew
- Dracocephalum surmandinum Rech.f.
- Dracocephalum taliense Forrest ex W.W.Sm.
- Dracocephalum tanguticum Maxim.
- Dracocephalum thymiflorum L.
- Dracocephalum truncatum Y.Z.Sun ex C.Y.Wu
- Dracocephalum velutinum C.Y.Wu & W.T.Wang
- Dracocephalum wallichii Sealy
- Dracocephalum wendelboi Hedge
