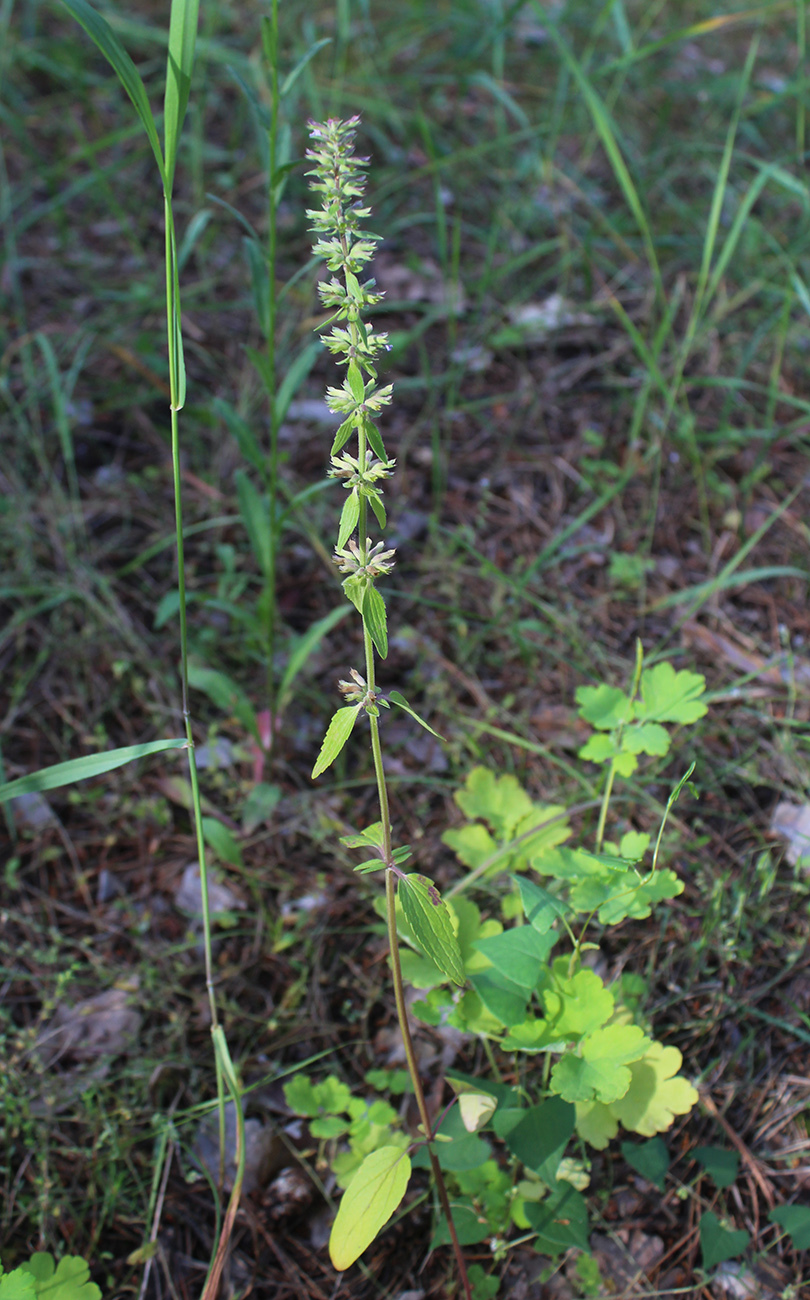

Scientific classification
- Kingdom: Plantae
- Clade: Tracheophytes
- Clade: Angiosperms
- Clade: Eudicots
- Clade: Asterids
- Order: Lamiales
- Family: Lamiaceae
- Genus: Dracocephalum
- Species: D. thymiflorum

Binomial name
- Dracocephalum thymiflorum L.

= Dracocephalum thymiflorum =

Species of flowering plant

Dracocephalum thymiflorum is a species of flowering plant belonging to the family Lamiaceae.

Its native range is Bulgaria to Southern Siberia and Iran.
