= List of Chilean ingredients =

This is a list of found in Chilean cuisine which are mostly those used in Mediterranean and Andean cuisine.

== Grains and maize ==
- Wheat
  - mote
- Maize
- Quinoa, a grain-like crop grown primarily for its edible seeds.

== Legume ==
- Bean

== Meat ==
- Beef
- Charqui, a form of jerky common in South America made from dried and salted meat, usually horse, llama or beef.
- Pork
- Goose

== Seafood ==
- Cod
- Crab
- Juan Fernández lobster
- Chilean mussel
- Rainbow trout
- Chilean sea urchin
- Salmon
- Centolla, a species of king crab, found off the Pacific coasts of South America
- Corvina - Chilean Sea Bass
- Congrio, the family of conger and garden eels
- Merluza, a family of cod-like fishes, including most hakes.
- Loco, a species of large sea snail, a marine gastropod mollusk native to the coasts of Chile and Peru.
- Picoroco, a species of giant barnacles native to the coasts of Chile and southern Peru.
- Piure, a class in the Urochordata subphylum of sac-like marine invertebrate filter feeders.
- Cochayuyo, algae

== Dairy products ==
- Milk (although rarely in fresh form in cities; long-life milk is standard).

== Vegetables ==
- Potato
    - Chuño, a freeze-dried potato product
- Chilean rhubarb
- Sweet potato
- Tomato
- Artichoke
- Basil
- Cabbage
- Carrot
- Coriander
- Garlic
- Key lime
- Onion

== Fruits ==
- Avocado
- Magellan Barberry
- Grape
- Olive
  - Olive oil
- Quince
- Cherimoya, a fruit
- Lúcuma, a subtropical fruit of Andean origin.
- Mountain papaya, a fruit usually cooked as a vegetable, but is also eaten raw; like Papaya, it is rich in the digestive enzyme papain.
- Murta, a shrub native to southern Chile. The fruit is a small red, white or purple berry 1 cm diameter with a strong strawberry flavour.
- Piñón, The seeds are edible, similar to large pine nuts, and are extensively harvested in Chile.

== Mushroom ==
- Changle, fungi
- Digüeñe, an orange-white coloured edible ascomycete fungus native to south-central Chile.

== Herbs and spices ==
- Boldo, herb
- Matico
- Yerba mate, grown in Paraguay, Argentina and Brazil.
- Sugar cane
- Merkén, It is a smoked and dried red hot chili pepper cacho cabra, which is ground into a powder.
