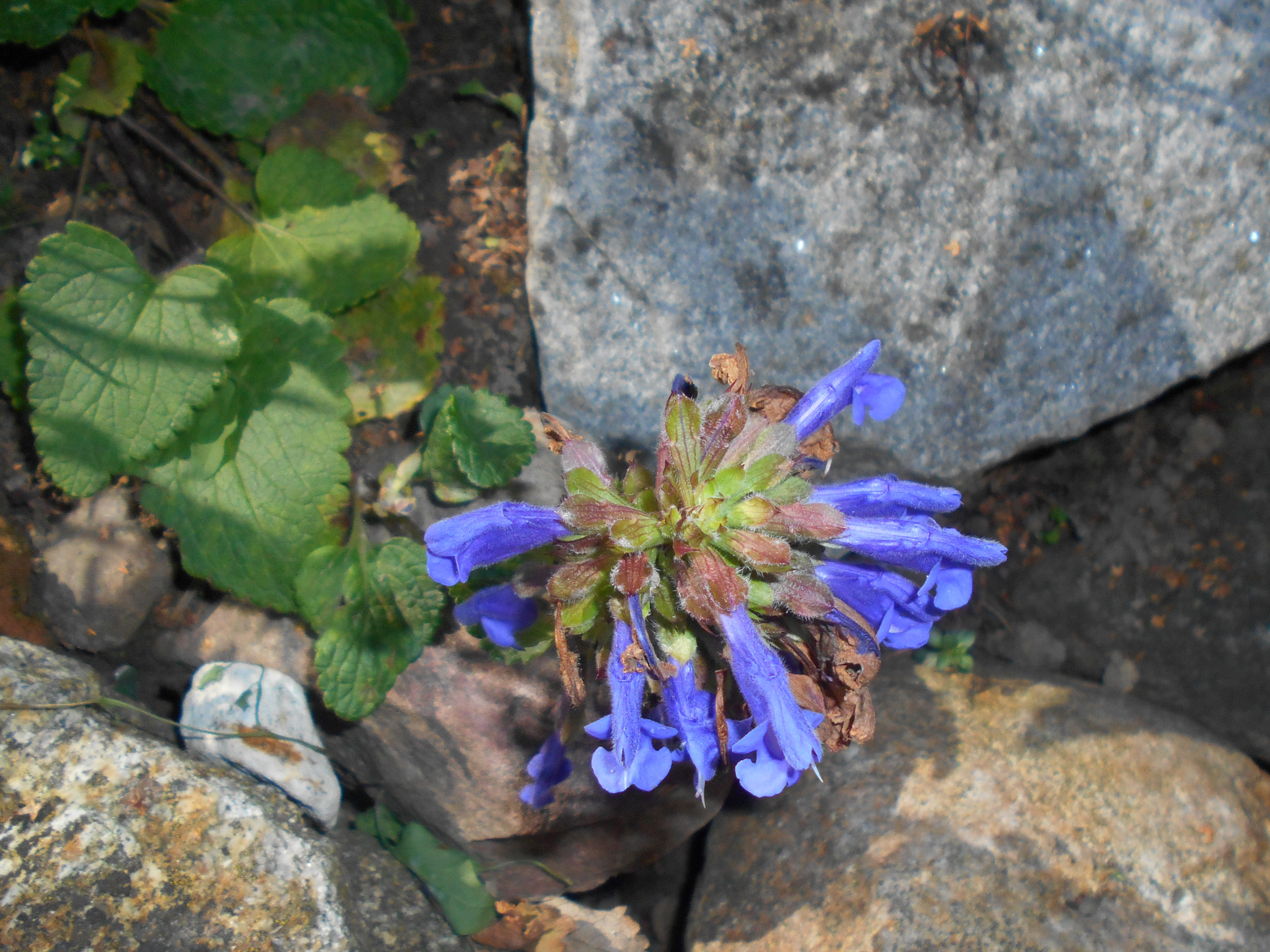

Scientific classification
- Kingdom: Plantae
- Clade: Tracheophytes
- Clade: Angiosperms
- Clade: Eudicots
- Clade: Asterids
- Order: Lamiales
- Family: Lamiaceae
- Genus: Dracocephalum
- Species: D. rupestre

Binomial name
- Dracocephalum rupestre Hance

= Dracocephalum rupestre =

Species of flowering plant

Dracocephalum rupestre is a plant species in the genus Dracocephalum, endemic to China. The specific epithet, "rupestre", is derived from Latin, and pertains to the plant growing among rocks.

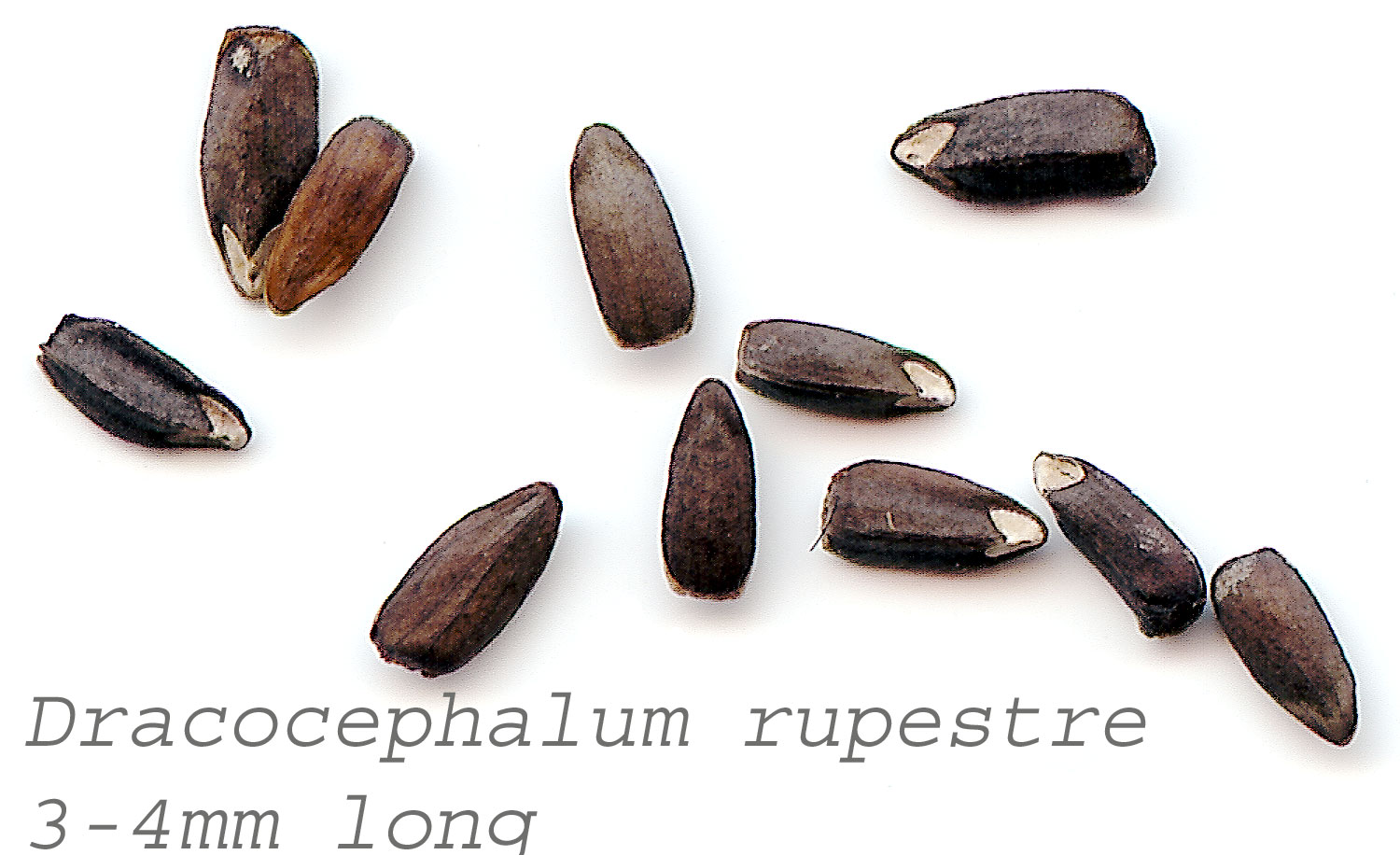
Seeds

== Description ==
Dracocephalum rupestre is a rhizomatous herb having numerous purplish, upwards-rising and unbranching stems (15–42 cm) scantily covered in backward-pointing hairs. Triangular-ovate, sparsely villous leaves (1.4–5.5 × 1.2–4.5 cm) are numerous. Inflorescences are verticillastrate with bluish-purple petalled flowers. Flowering period is from July–September.

== Habitat and distribution ==
The habitats of Dracocephalum rupestre are mountain meadows and slopes, or areas of thinning forest where more sun reaches the surface, at elevations between 700 and 3100 meters. They are native to China; occurring in Hebei, Inner Mongolia, Liaoning, Qinghai, and Shanxi provinces.

== Uses ==
People in Hebei and Shanxi have used Dracocephalum rupestre as a tea substitute, and in gardens for their showy flowers.
