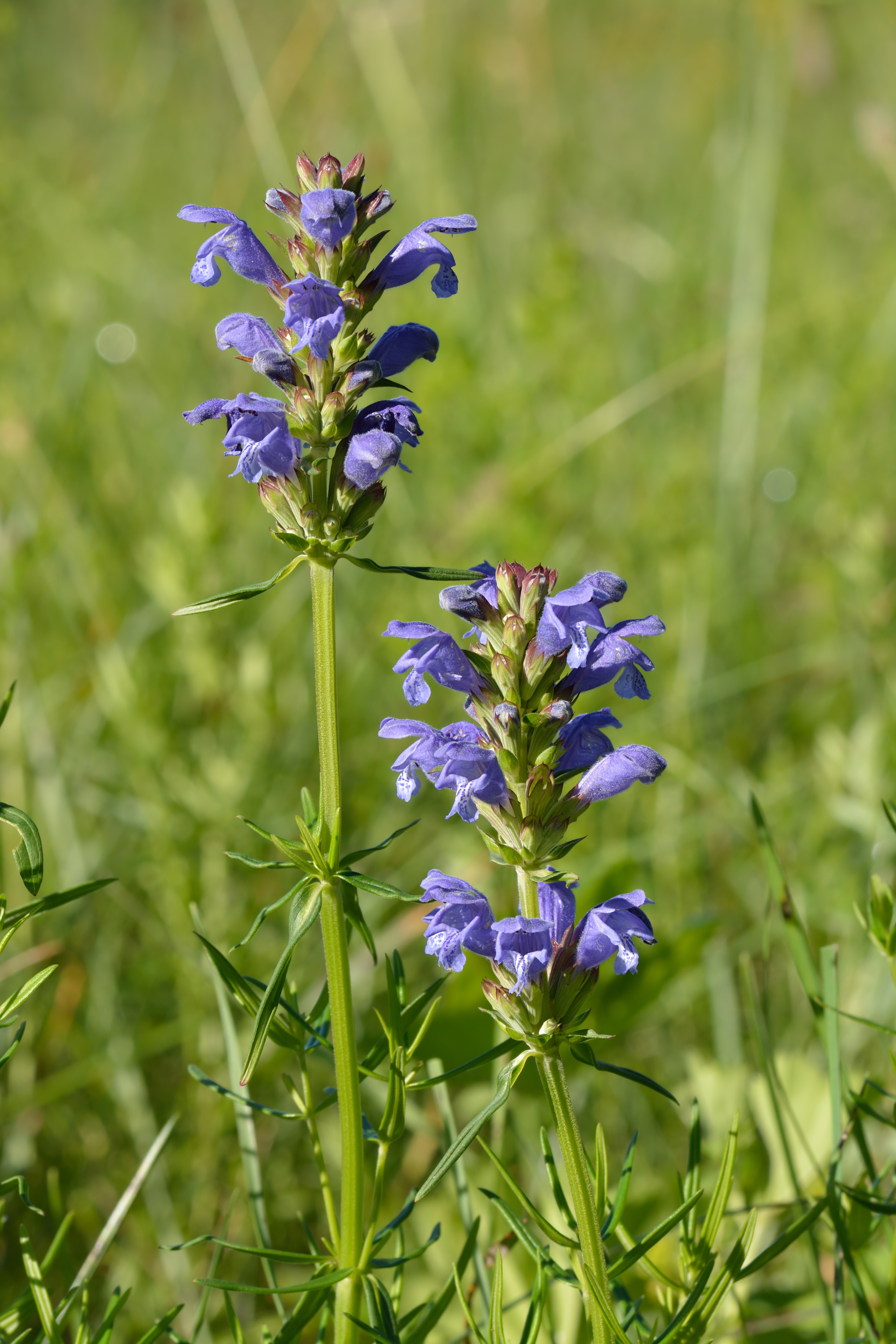

Scientific classification
- Kingdom: Plantae
- Clade: Tracheophytes
- Clade: Angiosperms
- Clade: Eudicots
- Clade: Asterids
- Order: Lamiales
- Family: Lamiaceae
- Genus: Dracocephalum
- Species: D. ruyschiana

Binomial name
- Dracocephalum ruyschiana L., 1753

= Dracocephalum ruyschiana =

Species of flowering plant

Dracocephalum ruyschiana is a species of Dracocephalum.

It is native to Eurasia.

== Synonyms ==
- Dracocephalum alpinum Salisb.
- Dracocephalum angustifolium Gilib.
- Dracocephalum hyssopifolium Mart. ex Steud.
- Dracocephalum spicatum (Mill.) Dulac
- Ruyschiana fasciculata Clairv.
- Ruyschiana ruyschiana (L.) House
- Ruyschiana spicata Mill.
- Zornia linearifolia Moench
