= Dal bhat =

Lentil and rice dish from South Asia

- Alternative names: Dal chawal; Dhal bhaat
- Course: Meal
- Place of origin: South Asia
- Associated cuisine: South Asian; Bangladeshi; Indian; Assamese; Awadhi; Bengali; Bhojpuri; Bihari; Gujarati; Kutchi; Marathi; Odia; Sikkimese; Nepalese; Sri Lankan; Indo-Caribbean; Guyanese; Jamaican; Surinamese; Trinidad and Tobago; Mauritian; Fijian
- Main ingredients: Chili pepper; cumin; garam masala; ghee; ginger; garlic; jimbu; lentil; onion; oil; rice; salt; tamarind; tomato; turmeric

Dal bhat (or dhal bhaat), also known as dal chawal or dal and rice, is a legume and rice dish which consists of thick soup called dal (lentils) and cooked rice called bhat (rice). It is a traditional meal in South Asia and one of the most common everyday meals in the region and in the Caribbean. The meal is simple, nutritious, and widely eaten as a daily staple food. The combination of dal and bhat is valued because it provides both protein and carbohydrates, making it a balanced and filling meal.

== History ==
Its exact origin is unclear, but the combination of dal (lentils) and bhat (rice) is rooted in ancient South Asian farming traditions, where both crops were staple foods. Over time, this combination became a balanced and practical meal due to its nutritional value, providing both carbohydrates from rice and protein from lentils.

In Nepal, dal bhat was not the main daily meal in its hilly and Himalayan regions. As a result, people in these regions traditionally ate dhindo which is made from grains such as maize, buckwheat, barley, or millet. These crops grow well in cooler climates and higher elevations, unlike rice, which requires warmer temperatures and is more suitable for lowland regions. It gradually became more common in areas with suitable conditions for rice cultivation, such as the Terai plains and fertile valleys like the Kathmandu Valley. With better farming and trade, dal bhat spread throughout Nepal. Today, it remains a traditional and widely eaten meal.

== Preparation and serving ==
=== Preparation ===
Dal (lentils) may be cooked with ingredients such as onion, garlic, ginger, chili pepper, tomatoes, or tamarind in addition to lentils or beans. It typically includes herbs and spices such as coriander, garam masala, cumin, and turmeric. Recipes may vary by season, region, ethnic group, or family traditions. In Nepal, for example, dal is often flavoured by frying jimbu (Himalayan aromatic leaf) in ghee or cooking oil and adding it to the cooked lentils.

Bhat (rice) is prepared by boiling or steaming rice in water until it becomes soft and fluffy. It is commonly cooked without spices and served as the main staple food alongside dal.

=== Serving ===
Dal bhat is commonly served with side dishes such as tarkari (vegetables), achar (pickles), chutney (relish), papadam (crispy flatbread), and others.

In Nepal and Bengal, it is sometimes referred to as dal bhat tarkari. The term tarkari is also used more broadly to refer to side dishes in general, and may include items such as masu (meat) in Nepalese cuisine, and machh bhaja (fried fish) in Bengali cuisine.

In the Indian state of Bihar, dal bhat is commonly referred to as dal bhat bhujiya. The term bhujiya ("fried or sautéed vegetables") is also used more broadly to refer to side dishes in Bihari cuisine in general, it is often eaten with chokha (mashed seasonal vegetables especially potatoes).

== Gallery ==
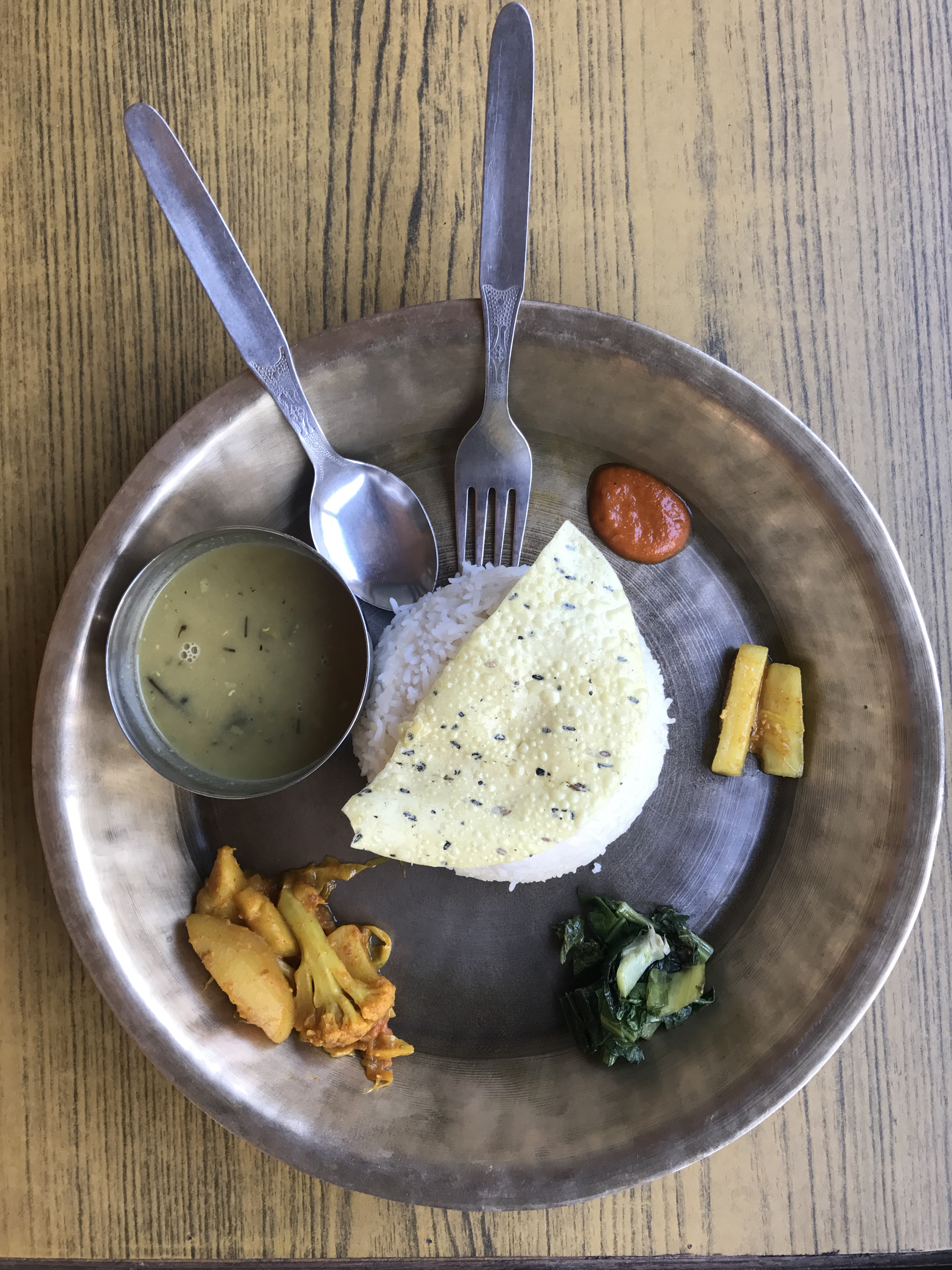
Nepalese-style dal bhat

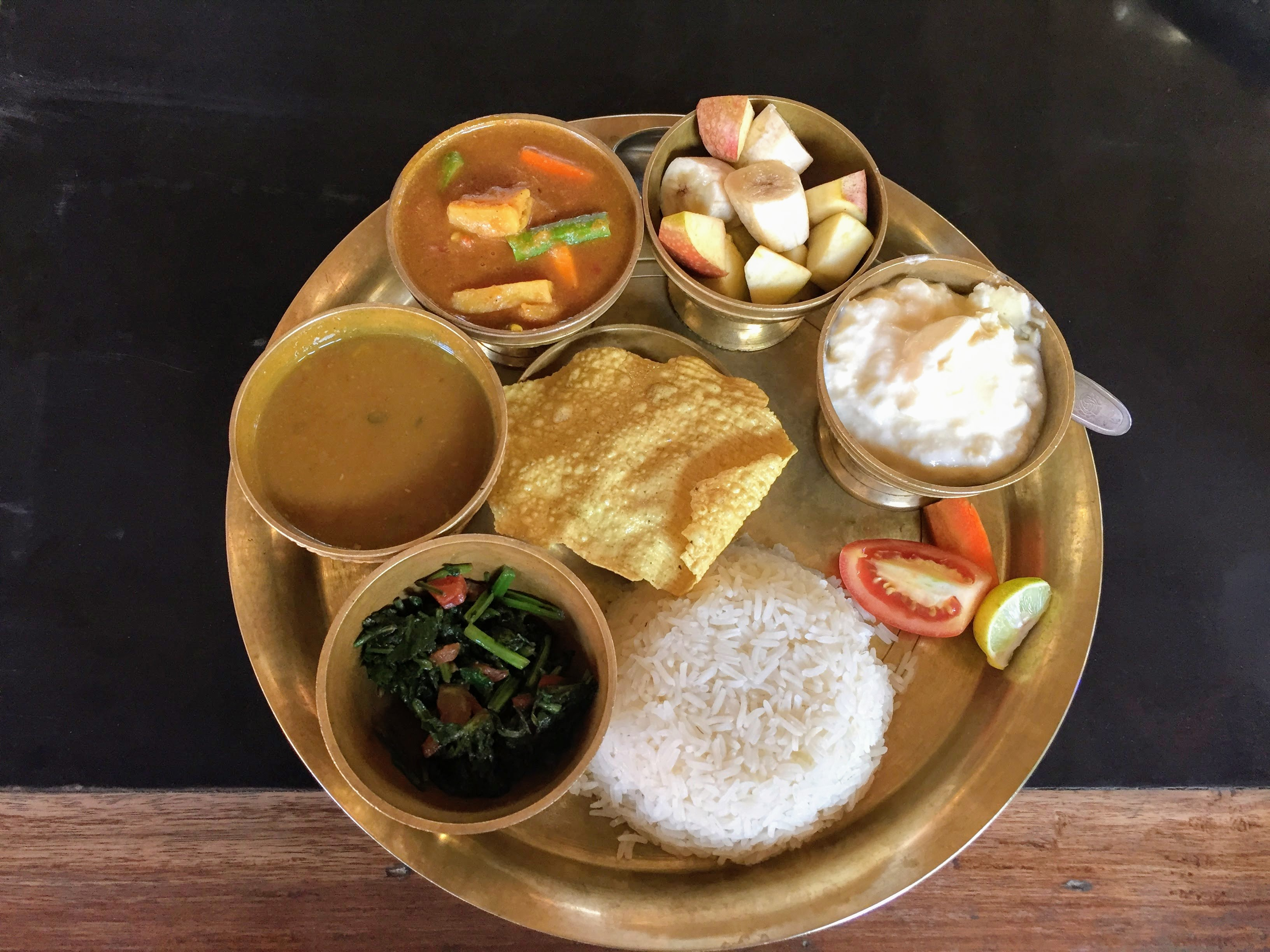
Nepalese-style dal bhat tarkari

== See also ==
- Thali
