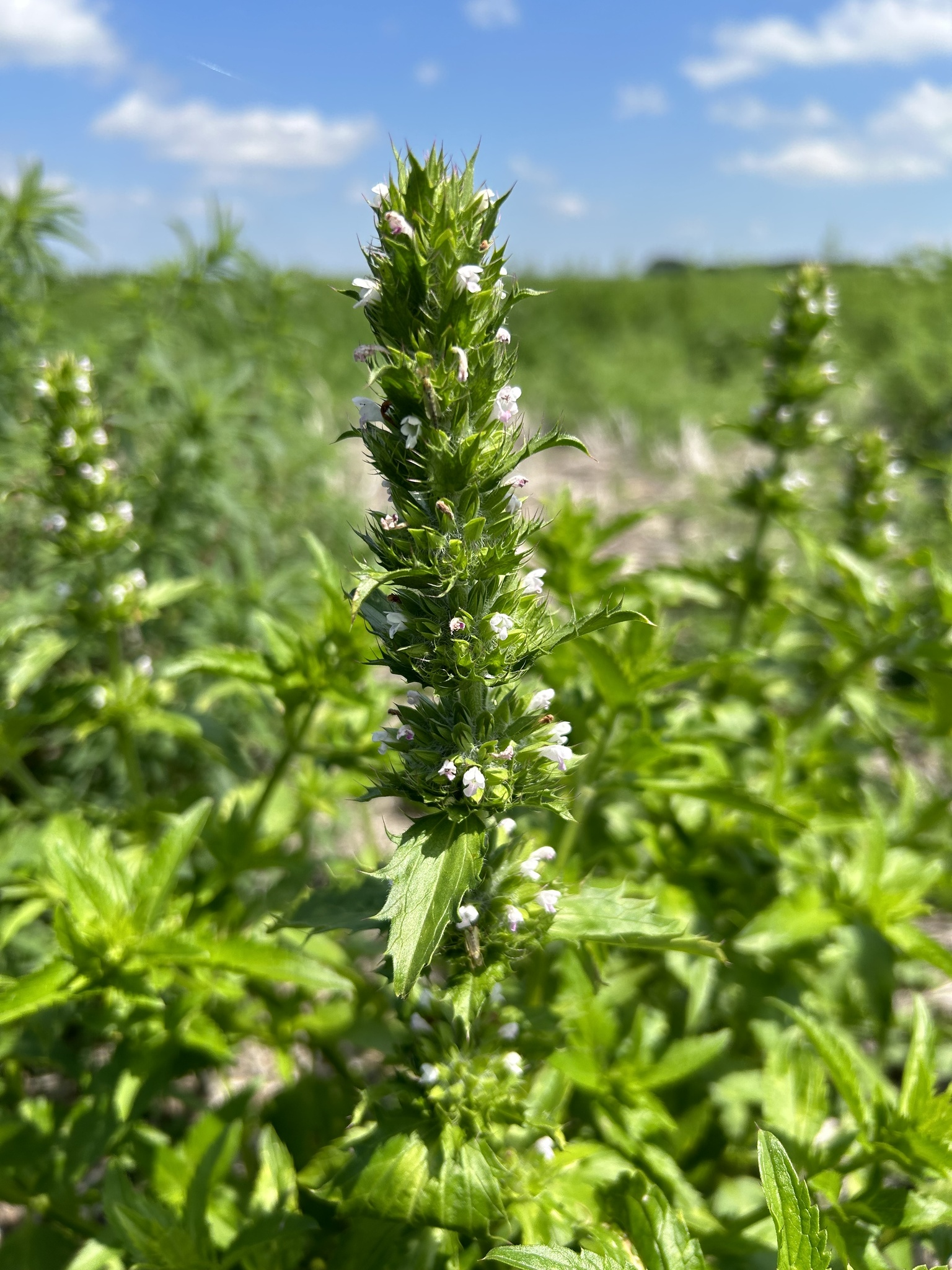
- Dracocephalum parviflorum

Conservation status
- Secure (NatureServe)

Scientific classification
- Kingdom: Plantae
- Clade: Tracheophytes
- Clade: Angiosperms
- Clade: Eudicots
- Clade: Asterids
- Order: Lamiales
- Family: Lamiaceae
- Genus: Dracocephalum
- Species: D. parviflorum

Binomial name
- Dracocephalum parviflorum Nutt.

Synonyms
- List: Dracocephalum parviflorum var. chelonicum Lunell; Ruyschiana parviflora (Nutt.) House

= Dracocephalum parviflorum =

Dragonhead mint

Plant species in the mint family

Dracocephalum parviflorum, known as dragonhead mint or American dragonhead, is a wild North American mint growing across much of the United States (especially in the Great Lakes region and in the deserts and mountains of the West), as well as much of Canada and Alaska. It grows as either an annual or biennial, producing clusters of small pink to violet flowers in whorls at the ends of many branching stems. The seeds are small (about 2 mm), dark, and high in oil content, about 20%.

A 2006 study suggests that this mint may have application as a commercial birdseed crop in Alaska.
