= Allium przewalskianum =

jimbu Ladakh onion 青甘韭 qing gan jiu

Scientific classification
- Kingdom: Plantae
- Clade: Tracheophytes
- Clade: Angiosperms
- Clade: Monocots
- Order: Asparagales
- Family: Amaryllidaceae
- Subfamily: Allioideae
- Genus: Allium
- Subgenus: A. subg. Rhizirideum
- Species: A. przewalskianum

Binomial name
- Allium przewalskianum Regel

Synonyms
- Allium jacquemontii Regel; Allium jacquemontii var. parviflorum (Ledeb.) Aswal; Allium junceum Jacquem. ex Baker; Allium przewalskianum var. planifolium Regel; Allium rubellum var. parviflorum Ledeb.; Allium stenophyllum Wall.; Allium stoliczkii Regel

Species of plant

Allium przewalskianum is an Asian species of wild onion in the Amaryllis family.

The species is widely distributed in mountains areas in the Himalayas (India, Nepal, Pakistan) and parts of China (Gansu, Inner Mongolia, Ningxia, Qinghai, Shaanxi, Sichuan, Xinjiang, Tibet, Yunnan).

Allium przewalskianum has narrow bulbs up to 10 mm across. Scape is up to 40 cm tall, round in cross-section. Leaves are tubular, about the same length as the scape. Umbel is densely crowded with many red or dark purple flowers.

Allium przewalskianum is one of two species referred to as jimbu in Nepal, used in Nepalese cuisine. The other is Allium hypsistum.
