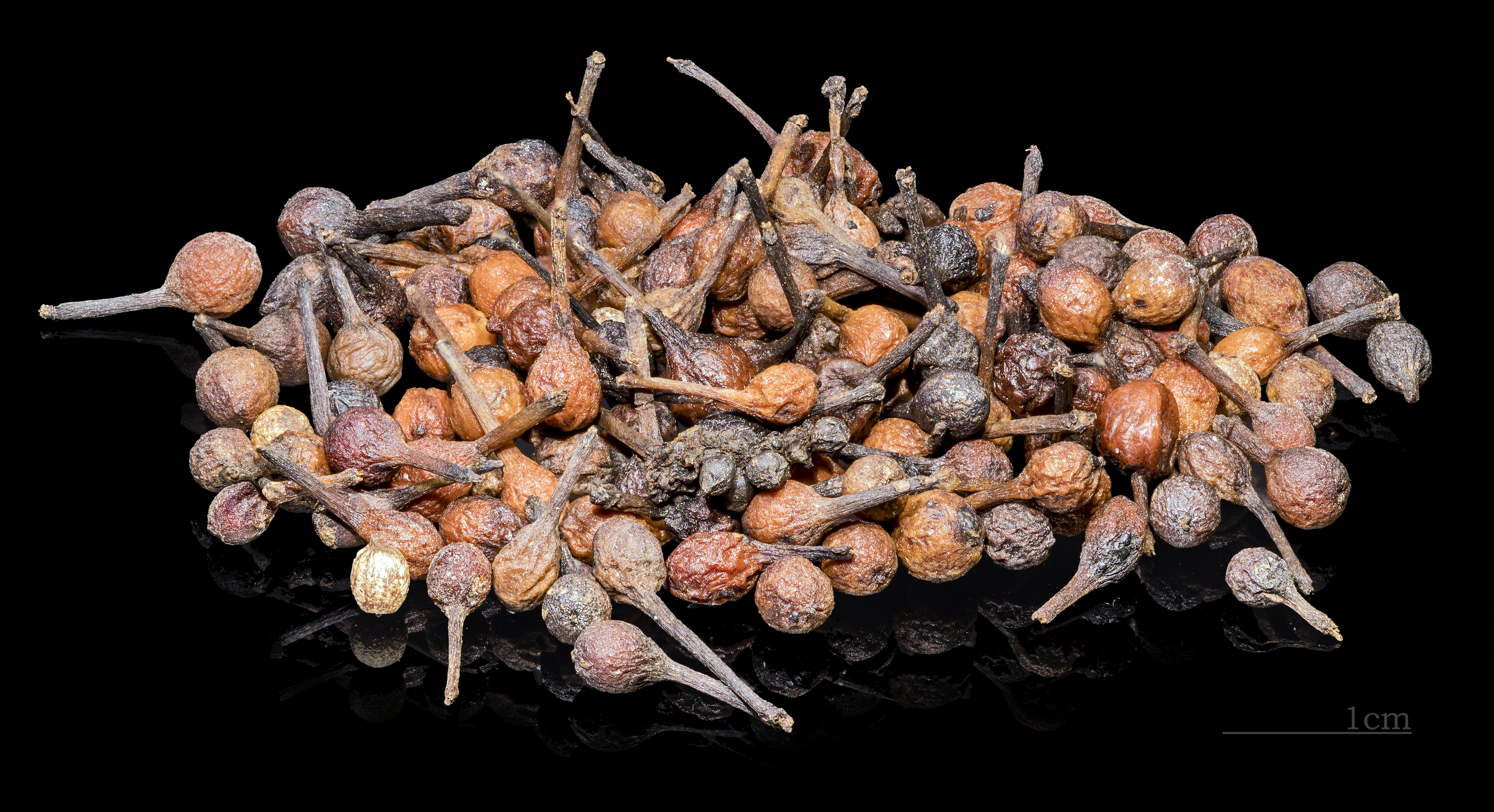

Scientific classification
- Kingdom: Plantae
- Clade: Tracheophytes
- Clade: Angiosperms
- Clade: Magnoliids
- Order: Piperales
- Family: Piperaceae
- Genus: Piper
- Species: P. borbonense

Binomial name
- Piper borbonense (Miq.) C. DC.

= Piper borbonense =

Voatsiperifery

Species of flowering plant

Piper borbonense is a species of plant in the genus Piper. A close relative of black pepper, its berries are used as a spice known as voatsiperifery, which comes from voa, the Malagasy word for fruit, and tsiperifery, the local name of the plant. A wild pepper, it grows in Madagascar. It can reach up to 20 metres and needs natural plant support.
