= Changle (disambiguation) =

Changle, Fuzhou is a city in China

Changle may also refer to:

- Changle County, in Shandong, China

== Towns and townships ==
- Changle, Shaoyang (长乐乡), a township of Shaoyang County, Hunan province
- Changle, Miluo (长乐镇), a town in Miluo City, Hunan province
- Changle River, in Zhejiang, China

== Edible fungi ==
- Clavulina cristata
- Ramaria flava
