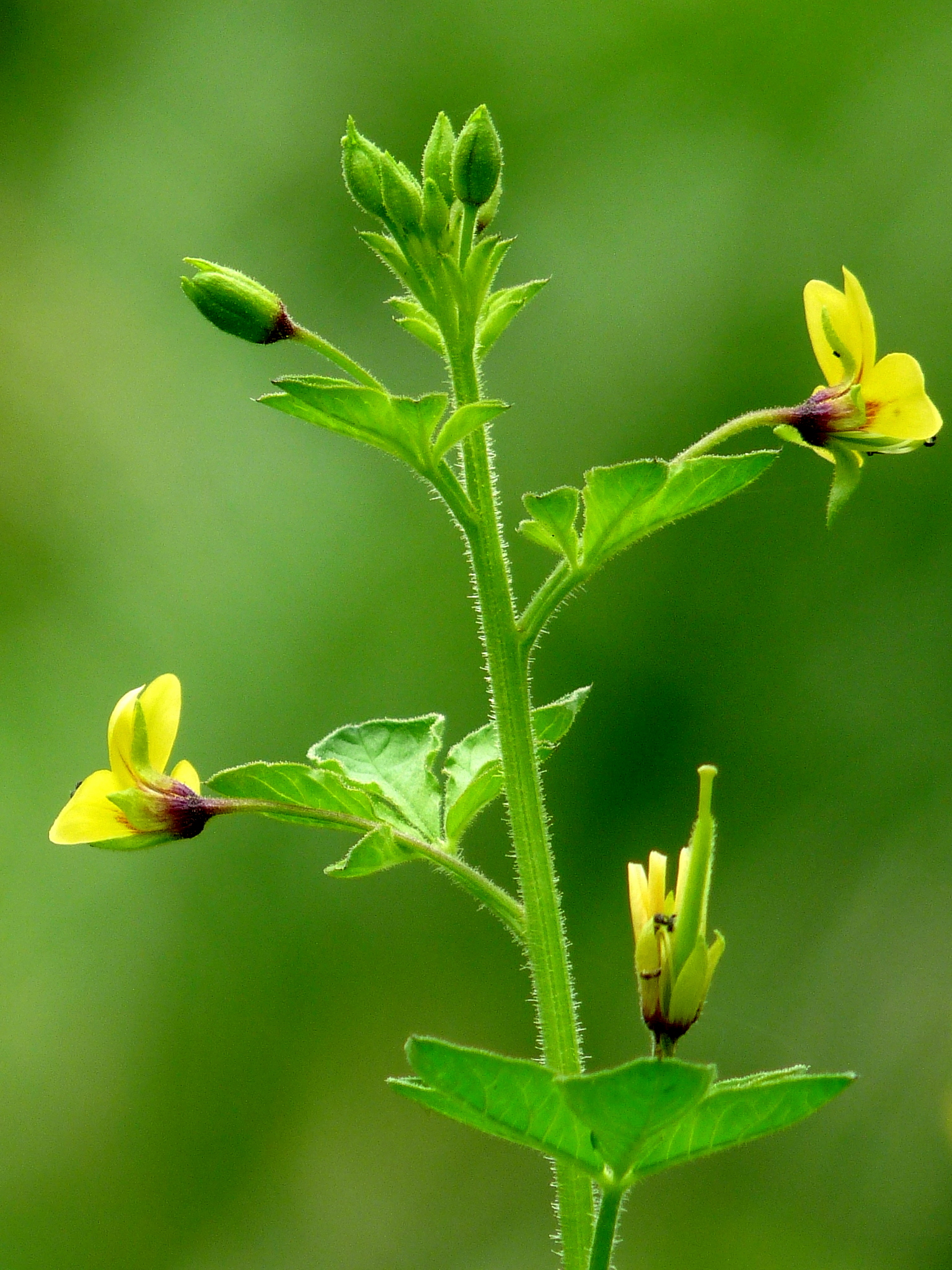

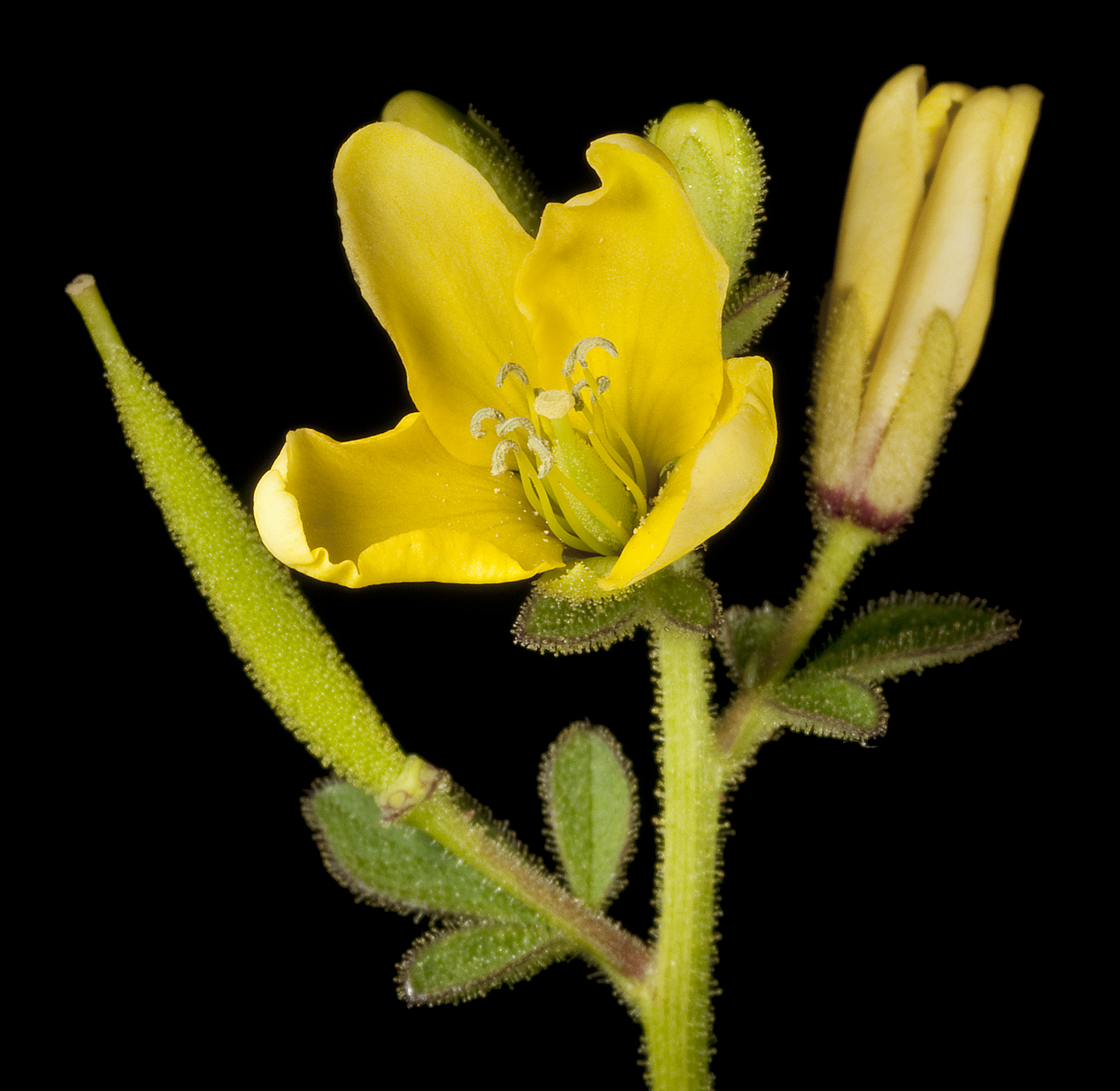

Scientific classification
- Kingdom: Plantae
- Clade: Tracheophytes
- Clade: Angiosperms
- Clade: Eudicots
- Clade: Rosids
- Order: Brassicales
- Family: Cleomaceae
- Genus: Cleome
- Species: C. viscosa

Binomial name
- Cleome viscosa L.

Synonyms
- Arivela viscosa (L.) Raf.; Cleome acutifolia Elmer; Cleome icosandra L.; Polanisia icosandra (L.) Wight & Arn.; Polanisia microphylla Eichler; Polanisia viscosa (L.) Blume; Sinapistrum viscosum (L.) Moench

= Cleome viscosa =

Species of flowering plant

Cleome viscosa, the Asian spiderflower or tick weed is an annual herb that grows up to a meter high. It belongs to the family Cleomaceae. It is considered an invasive species and is widely distributed in warm and humid habitats across the Americas, Africa and Asia, and in Australia (where it is considered a native). It is commonly found during the rainy season.

The crushed leaves have been investigated as a treatment for stored seeds of cowpea, to prevent weevil infestation.

The leaves are used as external application to wounds and ulcers. The seeds are anthelmintic and carminative. The juice of the leaves is used as a remedy against discharge of pus from the ear. In a study comparing C. viscosa to standard antibiotics, it was proven to be effective at inhibiting microbial growth. This demonstrates its effectiveness as an antimicrobial agent in comparison to the antibiotic tetracycline.

In northern India, the seeds (called Jakhya) are used as a culinary herb, mainly for tempering. in Australia, the Walmajarri people of the southern Kimberley call it Jirlpirringarni.

== Description ==
Plants (10–)30–100(–160) cm. Stems viscid. Leaves: petiole 1.5–4.5(–8) cm, glandular-hirsute; leaflet blade ovate to oblanceolate-elliptic, (0.6–)2–6 × 0.5–3.5 cm, margins entire and glandular-ciliate, apex acute to obtuse, surfaces glandular-hirsute. Racemes 5–10 cm (10–15 cm in fruit); bracts (often deciduous), trifoliate, 10–25 mm, glandular-hirsute. Pedicels 6–30 mm, glandular-hirsute. Flowers: sepals green, lanceolate, 5–10 × 0.8–1.2 mm, glandular-hirsute; petals arranged in adaxial semicircle before anthesis, radially arranged at anthesis, bright yellow, sometimes purple basally, oblong to ovate, 7–14 × 3–4 mm; stamens dimorphic, 4–10 adaxial ones much shorter with swelling proximal to anthers, green, 5–9 mm; anthers 1.4–3 mm; ovary 6–10 mm, densely glandular; style 1–1.2 mm. Capsules dehiscing only partway from apex to base, 30–100 × 2–4 mm, glandular-hirsute. Seeds light brown, 1.2–1.8 × 1–1.2 mm, finely ridged transversely. 2n = 20.

=== Phenology ===
June–August (summer)

== Taxonomy ==
The species was first described as Cleome viscosa in 1753 by Carl Linnaeus This name is not accepted by the Western Australian Herbarium. In Western Australia the accepted name is Arivela viscosa (L.) Raf., the name given to it in 1838 by Constantine Samuel Rafinesque for the phylogenetic reasons given by Russell Barrett and others in 2017.

== Gallery ==
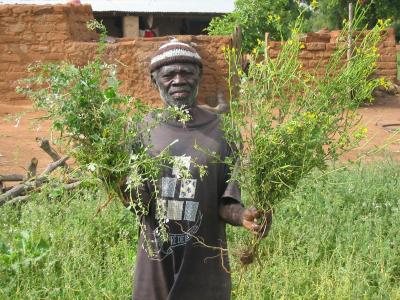
Cleome viscosa

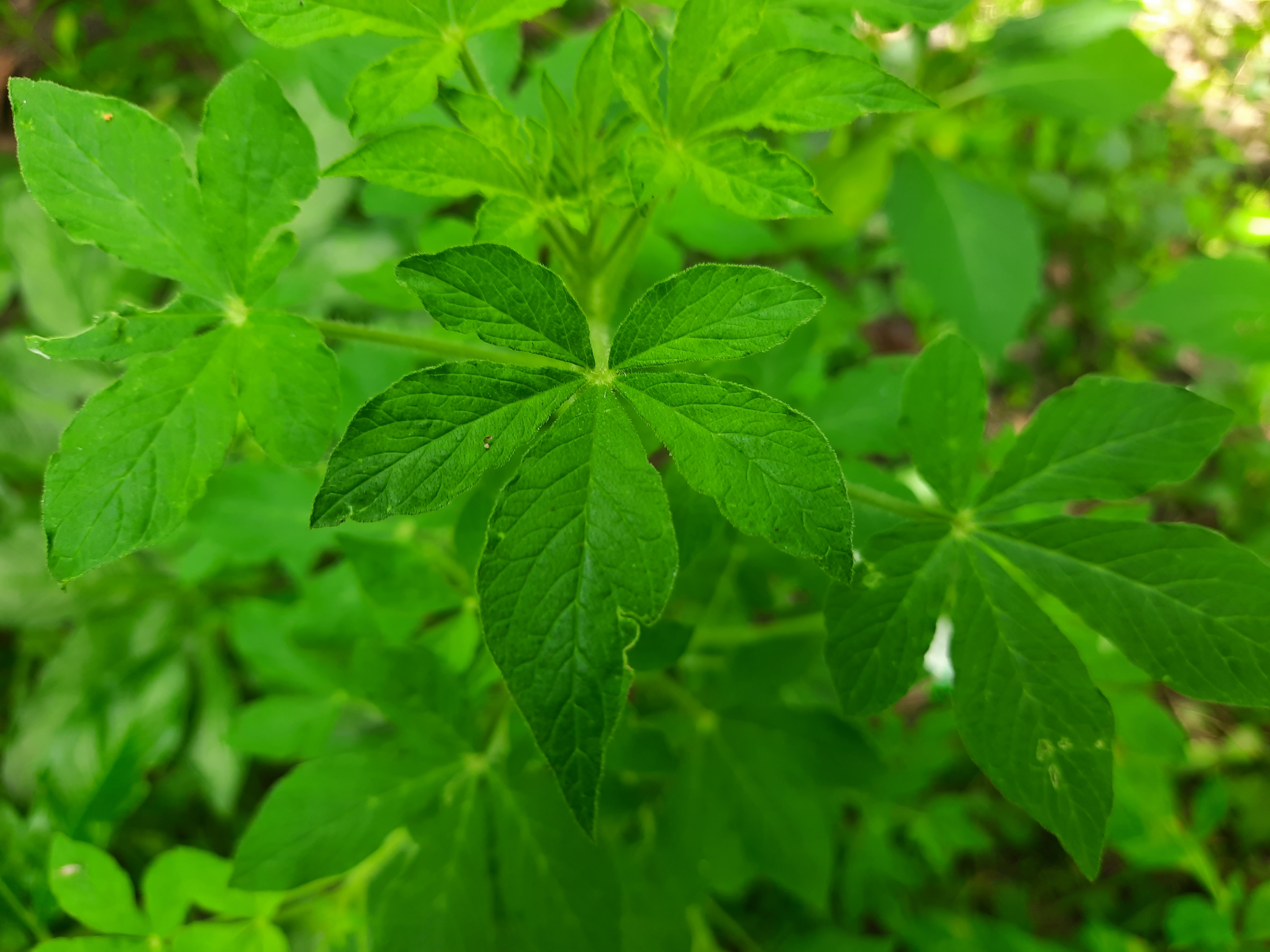
Leaf of Cleome viscosa

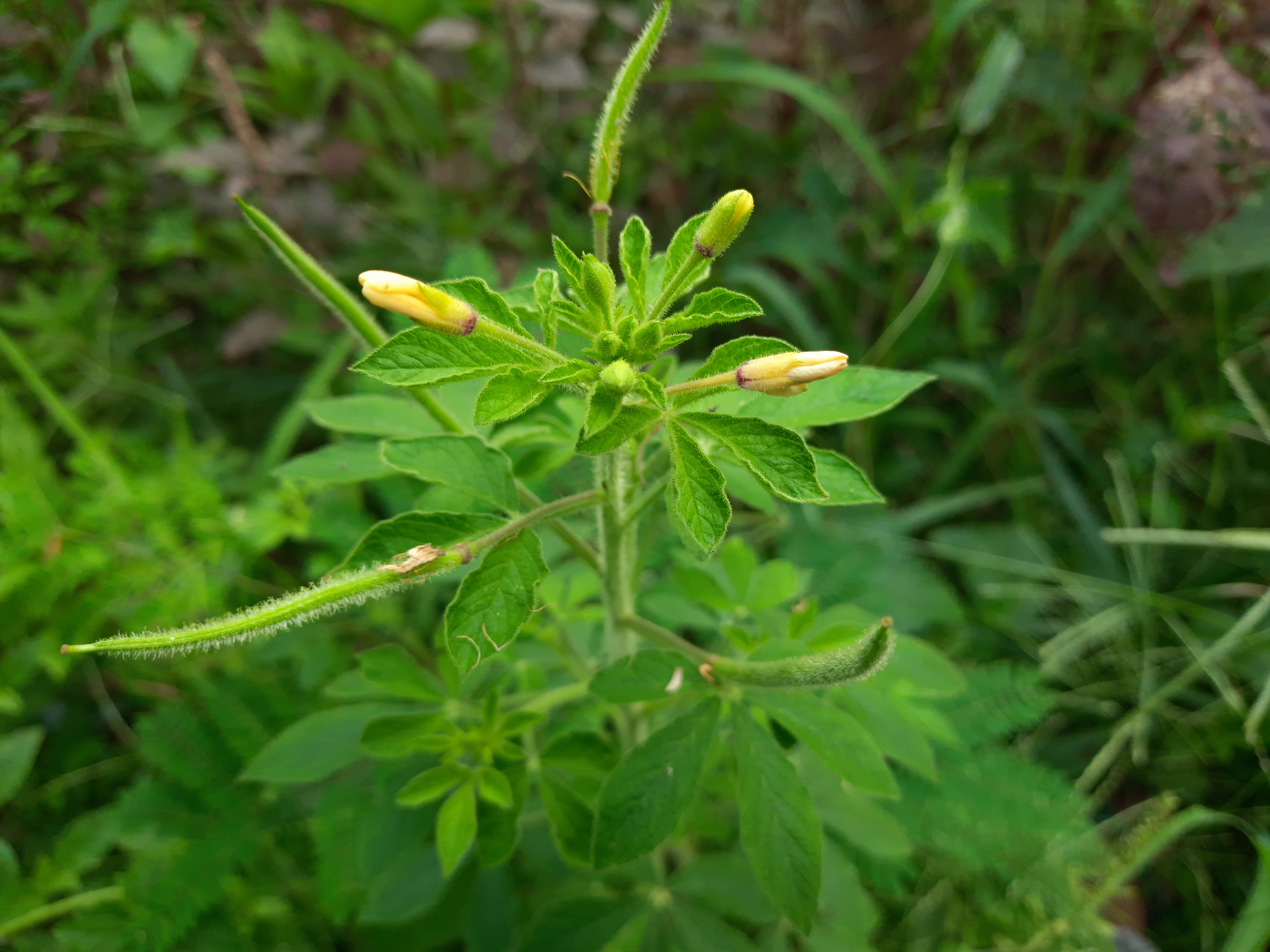
Flower buds and Fruits of Cleome viscosa

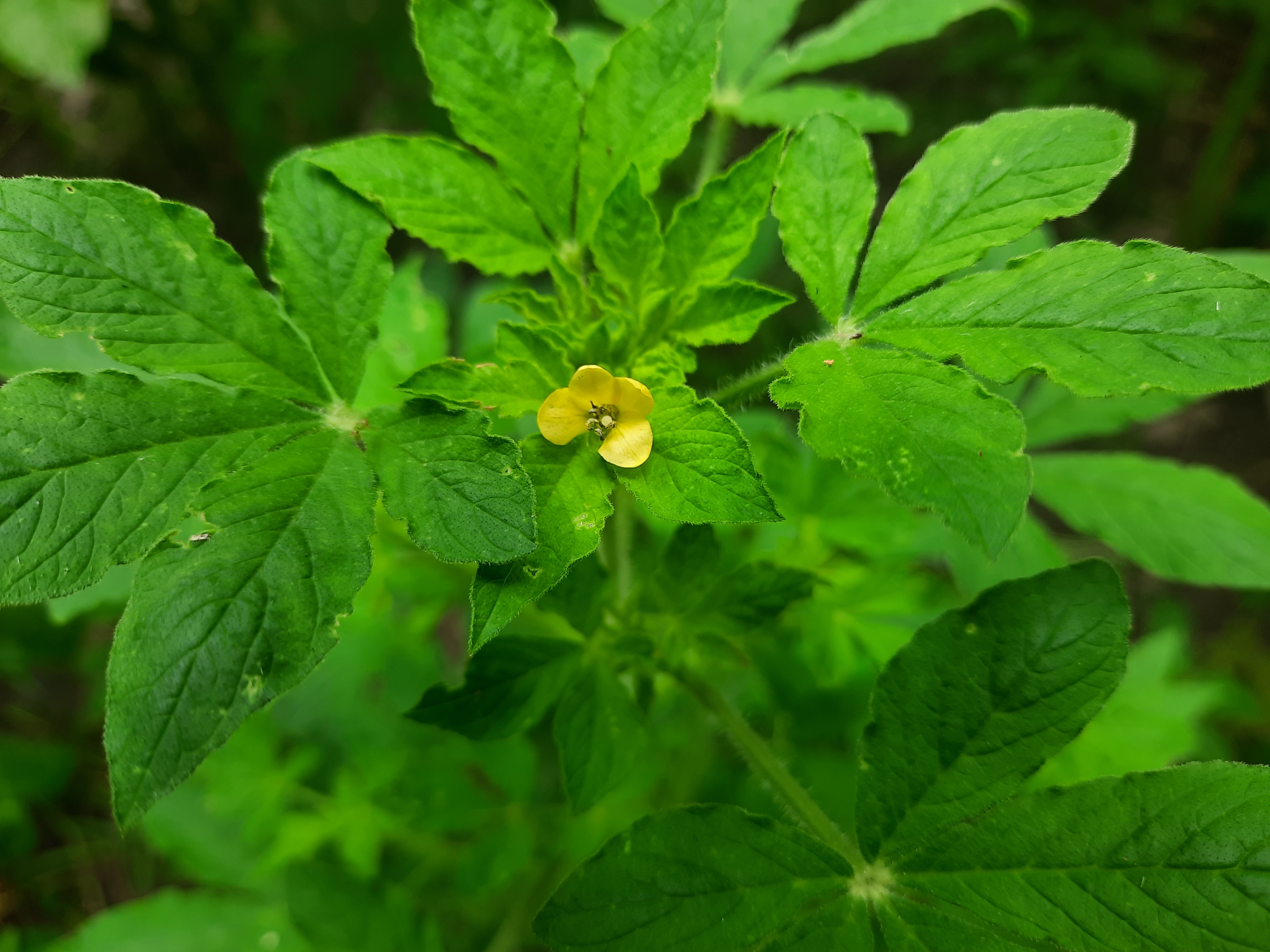
Flower of Cleome viscosa

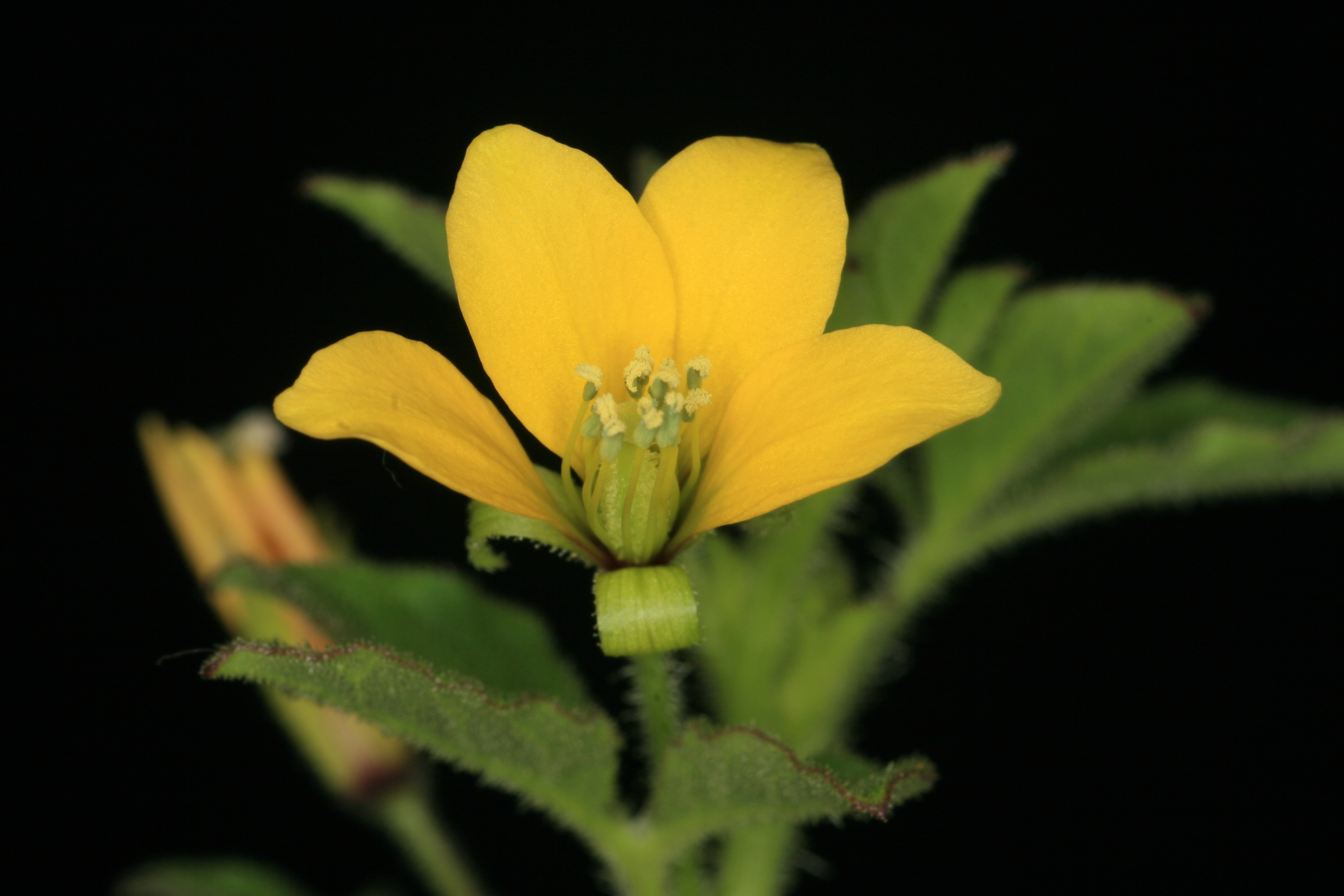
Flower of Cleome viscosa

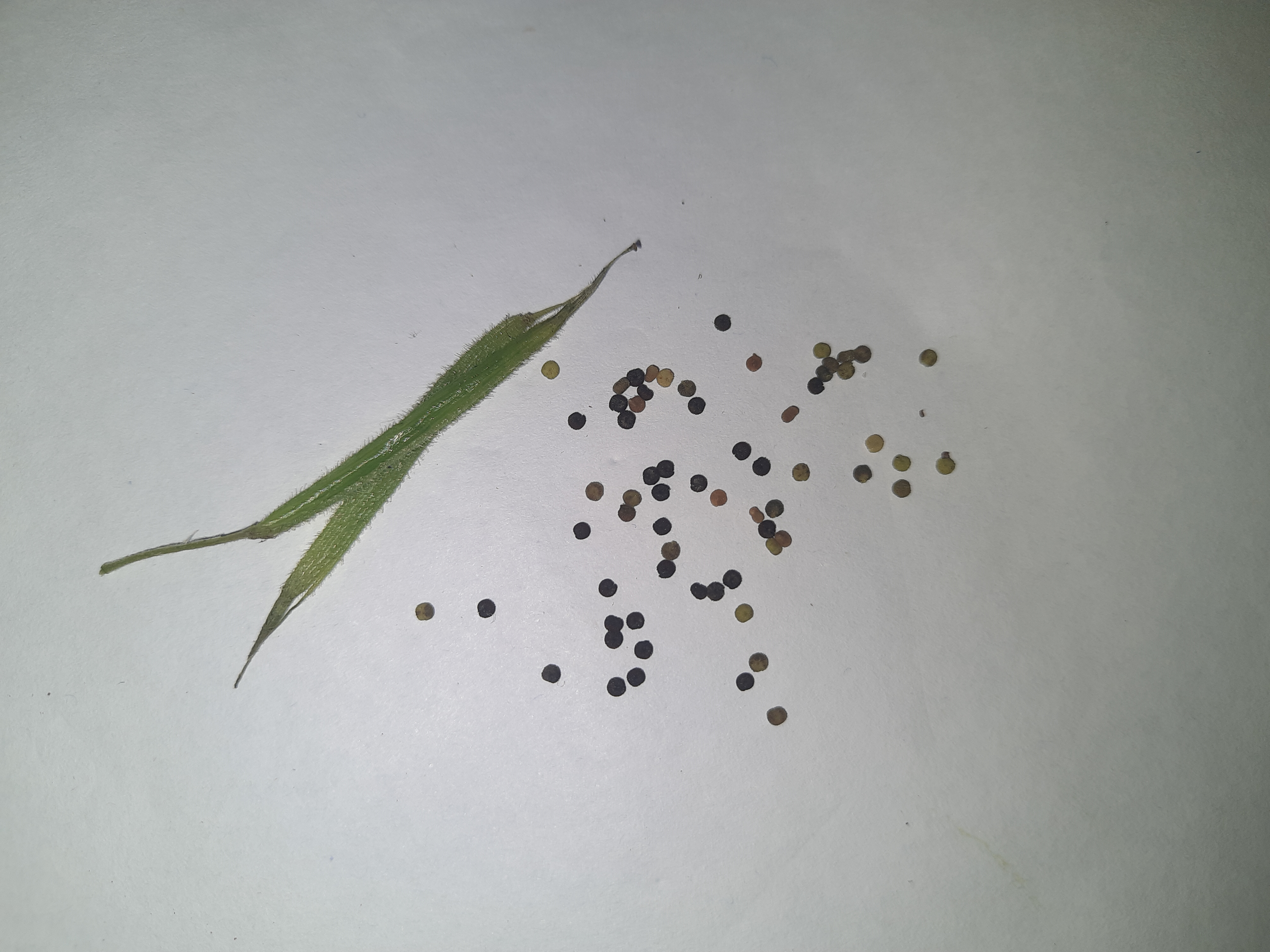
Seeds of Cleome viscosa
