= Jakhya =

Spice, seed of Cleome viscosa

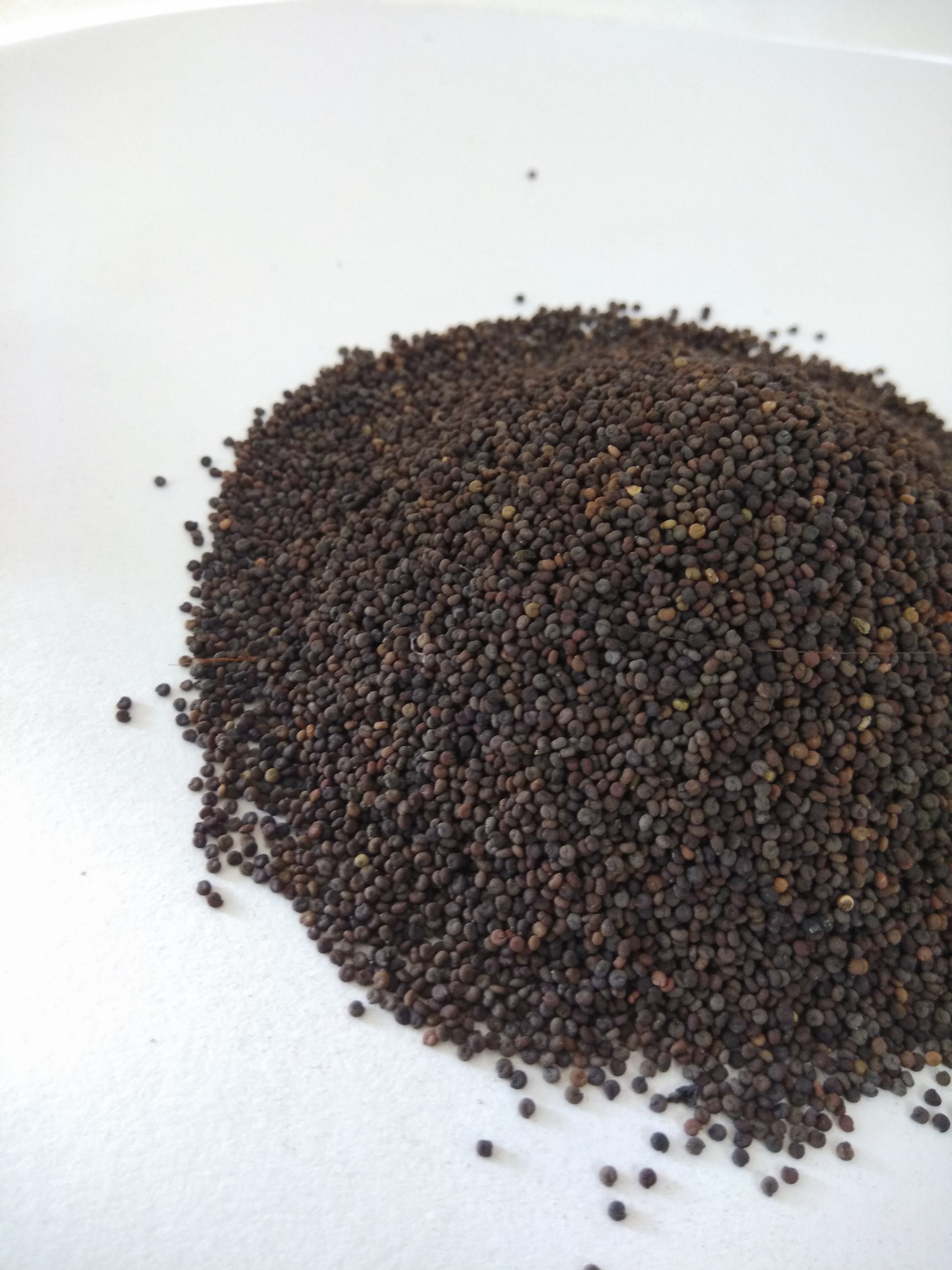
Jakhya

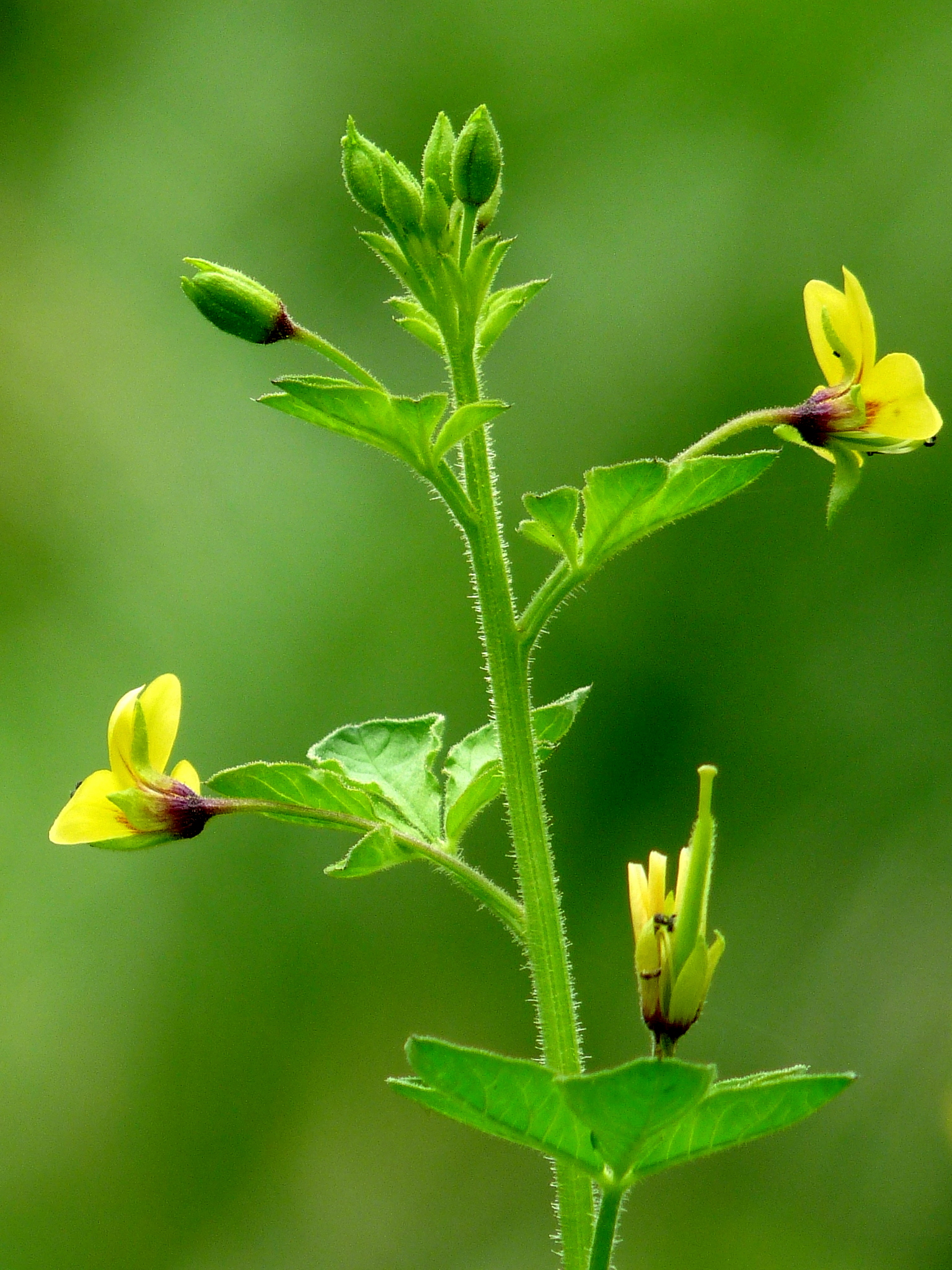
Cleome viscosa

Jakhya (Garhwali: जख्या) (also called dog mustard or wild mustard) is the seed of the Cleome viscosa plant used for tempering on culinary dishes. It is mostly grown and consumed in Uttarakhand and in the Terai regions of India and Nepal.

The seeds are dark brown in color, and crackle on being heated in oil. It is used in the Garhwali and Kumaoni styles of cuisine.
