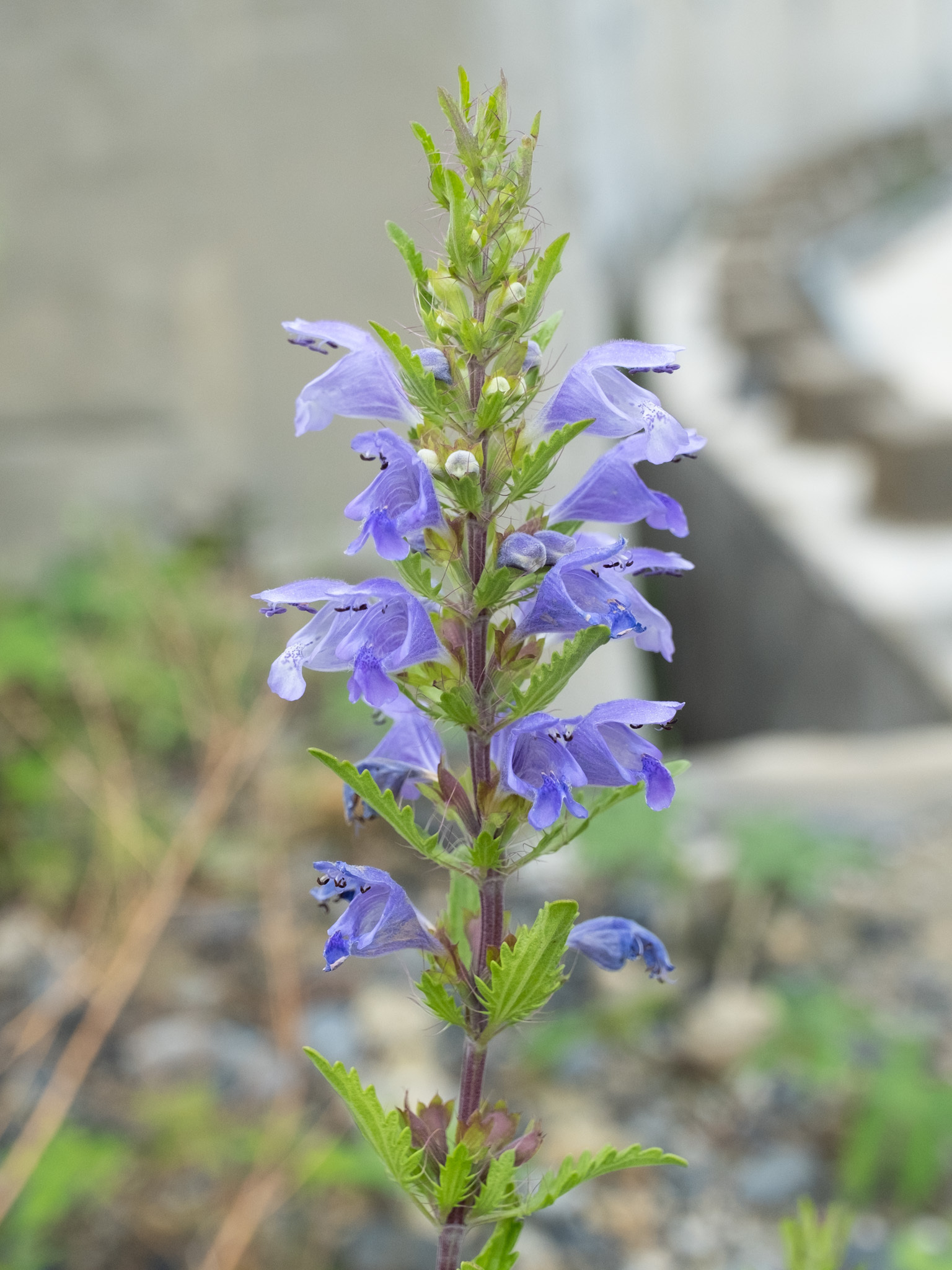
- Dracocephalum moldavica, figure from Deutschlands Flora in Abbildungen by Johann Georg Sturm (1796)

Scientific classification
- Kingdom: Plantae
- Clade: Tracheophytes
- Clade: Angiosperms
- Clade: Eudicots
- Clade: Asterids
- Order: Lamiales
- Family: Lamiaceae
- Genus: Dracocephalum
- Species: D. moldavica

Binomial name
- Dracocephalum moldavica L.

= Dracocephalum moldavica =

Moldavian dragonhead

Species of flowering plant

Dracocephalum moldavica, the Moldavian dragonhead, is an annual herbaceous plant. The first formal botanical description of D. moldavica was by Linnaeus in Species Plantarum 2:595. 1753.

== Distribution ==
Although there is no precise accounting of its native range, Dracocephalum moldavica is known to be native to the temperate climate of Asia; in China (Gansu, Hebei, Heilongjiang, Henan, Jilin, Liaoning, Inner Mongolia, Shaanxi, Xinjiang and Shanxi provinces); Russia (Primorsky Krai; eastern and western Siberia); Tajikistan; and Turkmenistan. It has become naturalized in many locales in Eurasia, and is also cultivated elsewhere as a garden ornamental.

Dracocephalum moldavica is an introduced plant to diverse parts of the United States, and is now present in Connecticut, Nebraska, Vermont, and Wisconsin.

Dracocephalum moldavica is often mistaken for Melissa officinalis.
