= Allium hypsistum =

jimbu

Scientific classification
- Kingdom: Plantae
- Clade: Tracheophytes
- Clade: Angiosperms
- Clade: Monocots
- Order: Asparagales
- Family: Amaryllidaceae
- Subfamily: Allioideae
- Genus: Allium
- Species: A. hypsistum

Binomial name
- Allium hypsistum Stearn

Species of flowering plant

Allium hypsistum is a Nepalese species of wild onion in the Amaryllis family.

Allium hypsistum is one of two species referred to as jimbu in Nepal, used in Nepalese cuisine. The other is Allium przewalskianum.
