= Jimbu =

Family of flowering plants

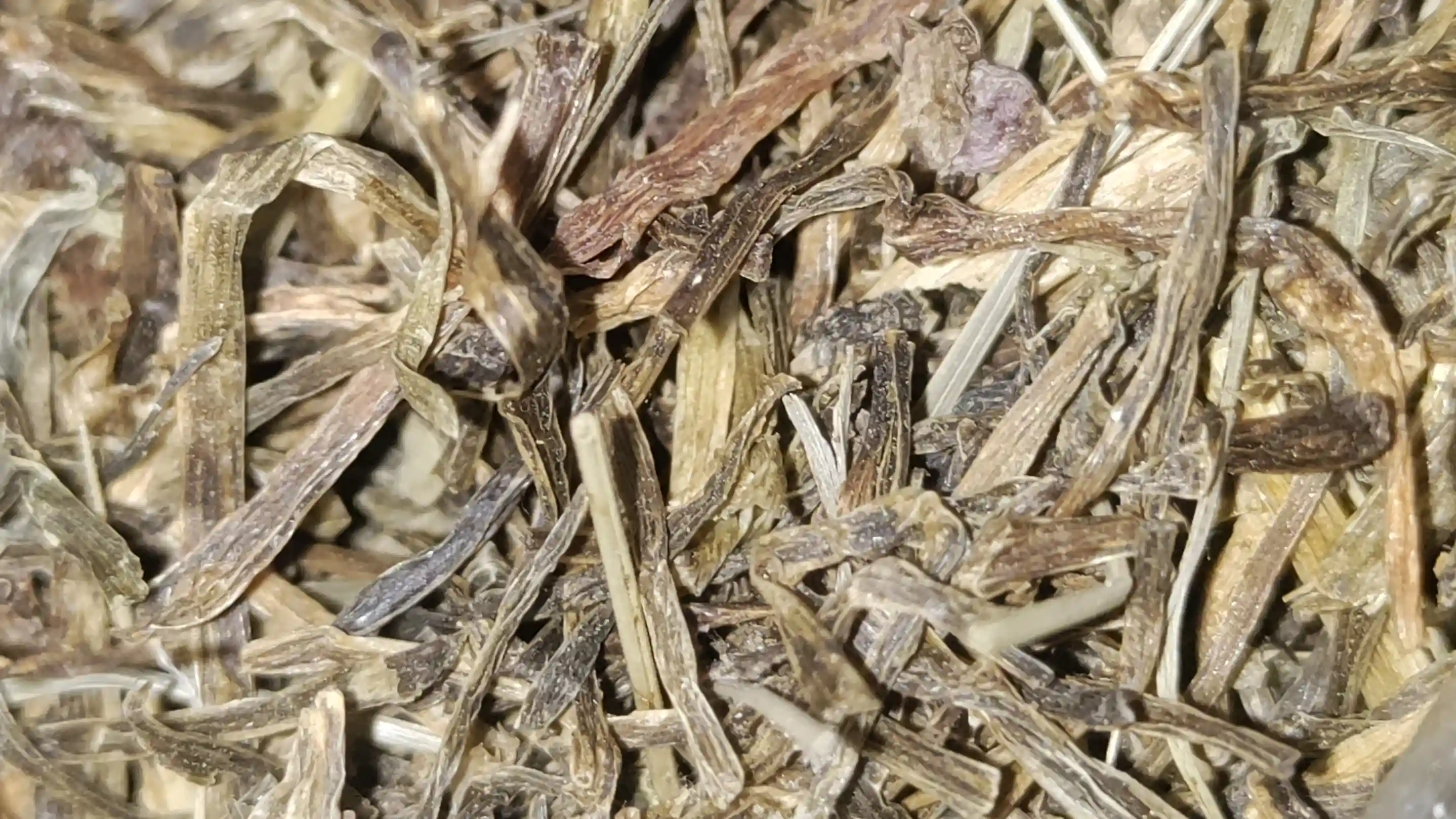
Dried jimbu leaves from Nepal

Jimbu is an herb belonging to the onion family, used extensively in Nepal and in some regions of central Himalayan states of India, such as Uttarakhand, where it is called jamboo or faran. It is composed of two species of Allium, A. hypsistum and A. przewalskianum. The herb, which has a taste in between onion and chives, is most commonly used dried. In the Mustang district of Nepal and Kumaon region of Uttarakhand, it is used to flavor vegetables, pickles, and meat. In the rest of Nepal it is most commonly used to flavor urad dal or lentils. The dried leaves are fried in ghee to develop their flavor. After harvest, people store jimbu dried for later use since it is a seasonal herb (main harvest between June and September).

== Uses ==
The above ground parts of these plants are used for traditional medicine. The use of the spice is primarily for flavoring and seasoning, although it is considered nutritious by people in the Upper Mustang region. Almost all (90%) households in the Upper Mustang region use jimbu as a spice in curries, soups, pickles, and meat items. Populations throughout the rest of Nepal and parts of Northern India like Uttarakhand use the herb extensively in their cuisine and for medicinal purposes. Jimbu is also considered to be a high value medicinal plant collected from Nepalese hillside pastures. In Upper Mustang and other North-Central parts of Nepal, households use jimbu for various illnesses such as flu, cough, and stomach pain. This could be related to the isolated nature of these villages, which lack basic health facilities.

In a 2006 study:

- 95% of households in the Upper Mustang region of Nepal use jimbu in cooking, mostly in curries to make the temper because this is a flavoring agent.
- 38% of households use jimbu as medicine (mostly as a treatment believed to help flu).
- 52% of households report having been involved in jimbu collection (and this percentage varies wildly by household size, with vastly more jimbu collection in households of size 5–6 people, with much less jimbu collection in sizes larger or smaller than that number.

== Economic benefits ==
After collection, the jimbu plant is dried in a closed area, such as a shed, for several days before it is completely air-dried. About 3288 kilograms of air dried jimbu was estimated to be collected in Upper Mustang during 2004, and almost all of that was used to sell. Most household income in alpine regions of Nepal is from collection and trade in medicinal plants. In the Upper Mustang Region of Central Nepal, agriculture, wild-plant collection, and seasonal trading are the most important economic activities for local livelihoods. Most households in the Upper Mustang region are involved in the collection of wild jimbu. The sale of jimbu makes a significant (10%) contribution to the annual household income in Upper Mustang. The income derived from jimbu is significantly influenced by the involvement of a household in the seasonal trade. On average, the annual income from jimbu sale for households involved in the trade was about $70 USD in 2003 and 2004. People usually act as both the collectors and traders of jimbu in order to maximize profits earned. The primary mode of trade for jimbu was door-to-door selling, although it is common for traders to travel to Kathmandu and other parts of Nepal and India to take part in seasonal trade. This means that people involved in the jimbu trade are currently looking for consumer markets to sell to, and would benefit from supplying to foreign markets. Furthermore, spices such as jimbu can be “high value, low volume cash crops”, and international trade in this product can enhance rural Nepalese incomes and livelihoods.

== Availability and practicality ==
There is a consistent availability of A. hypsistum, however A. przewalskianum was considered to be vulnerable in the 1990s. There are some agronomic constraints for jimbu collected in the wild that contribute to the vulnerability of this product. One constraint is the degradation of the plants due to sheep, goat and other livestock grazing. This is mainly because wild jimbu is generally found on communal land, and there is no active management to control access to the plants. One natural constraint to the availability of jimbu is the reliance on rainfall, especially during the early summer months, which is critical for the growth and survival of the plant. Most of the hillside land surface within the Mustang region lacks vegetation, and the sandy soils can easily become eroded by wind, snow, and rain, resulting in challenges for local livelihoods and agriculture. The jimbu plant species can be seen as an answer to erosion, as they grow in clumps in high-arid regions with sandy soils. Because of the remote, mountainous areas where jimbu is found, collection mainly involves physically able and energetic people. This means that collection is not always practical for elders or those with physical disabilities.

== Need for management ==
There are currently no active management systems in Upper Mustang for the collection and trade in the jimbu industry. Formal management systems like farmer groups and cooperatives are necessary in order to overcome the agronomic restraints of jimbu, such as controlling livestock grazing. Farmer cooperatives can improve community organization for jimbu collection and increase earnings through shared buying and selling in bulk. There are also few alternative systems for collecting jimbu besides in the wild. This means that, through active management, further domestication can be seen as an opportunity to enhance production and development of the jimbu industry. Sustainable collection of jimbu can be further developed if rotational harvesting sites (crop rotation) are introduced both on communal and private land. Jimbu, along with other spices, does not require extensive inputs of cash, machinery, land or labor in order to profit from. This means that jimbu can be planted in gardens or close proximity to a poorer Nepalese household in the Mustang Region, and especially on hillsides where the plants grow. A profitable crop near the household can benefit women in particular, mainly because it is easier for them to be involved and tend to the jimbu plants.

== See also ==
- Nepalese cuisine
