= Spice mix =

Blend of spices or herbs

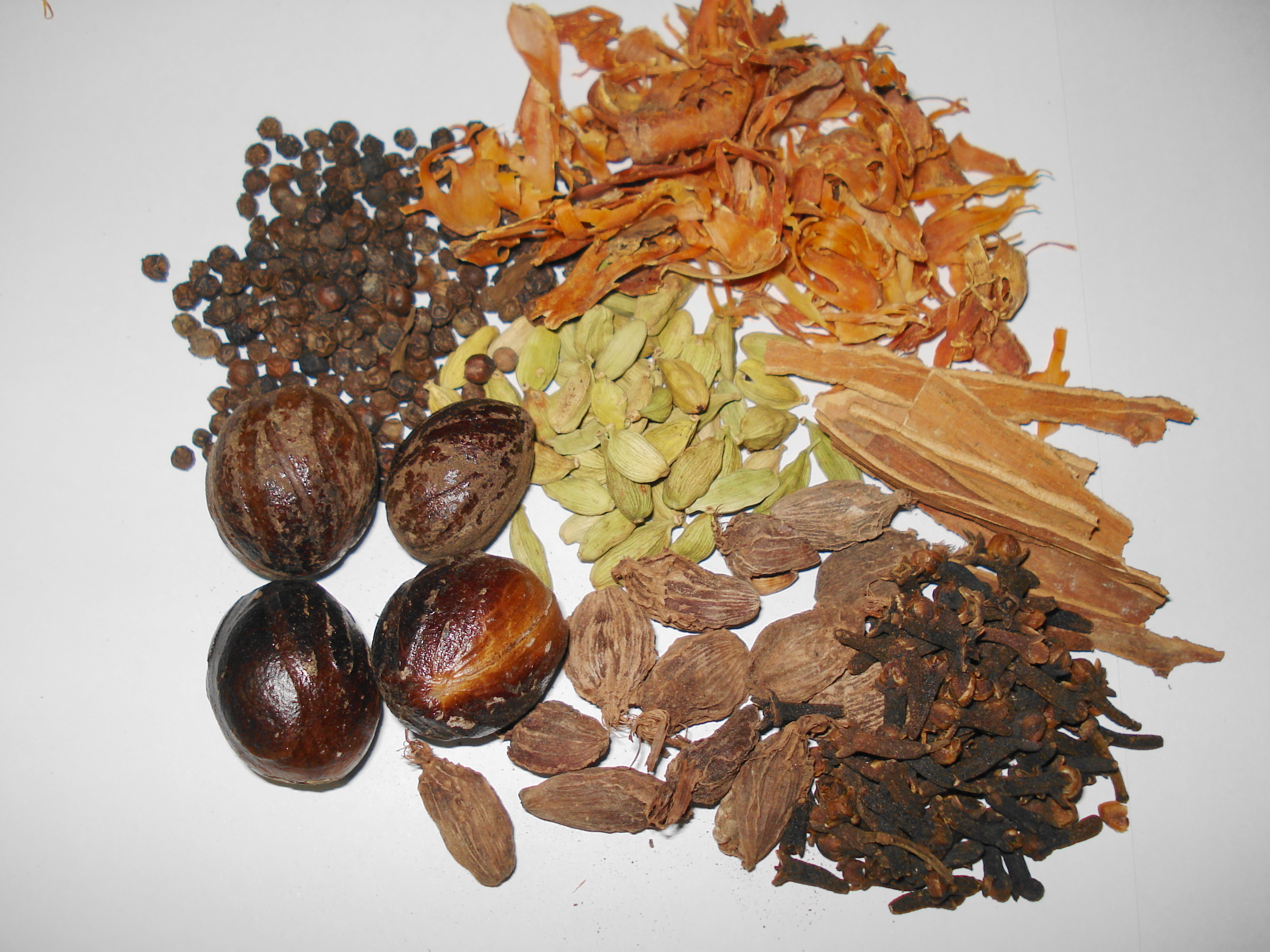
Whole spices used to create garam masala

Spice mixes are blended spices or herbs. When a certain combination of herbs or spices is called for in a recipe, it is convenient to blend these ingredients beforehand. Blends such as chili powder, curry powder, herbes de Provence, garlic salt, and other seasoned salts are traditionally sold pre-made by grocers, and sometimes baking blends such as pumpkin pie spice are also available. These spice mixes are also easily made by the home cook for later use.

== Masala ==
Masala (derived from Sanskrit मषि (maṣi), to mash or powder/grind to powder) is a term from the Indian subcontinent for a spice mix. A masala can be either a combination of dried (and usually dry-roasted) spices, or a paste (such as vindaloo masala) made from a mixture of spices and other ingredients—often garlic, ginger, onions, chilli paste and tomato. Masalas are used extensively in Indian cuisine to add spice and flavour, most familiarly to Western cuisine in chicken tikka masala and chicken curry, or in masala chai. Other South Asian cuisines including Bangladeshi, Nepalese, Pakistani and Sri Lankan, Southeast Asian cuisine such as Burmese, and the Caribbean regularly use spice mixes.

== Notable spice mixes by region ==
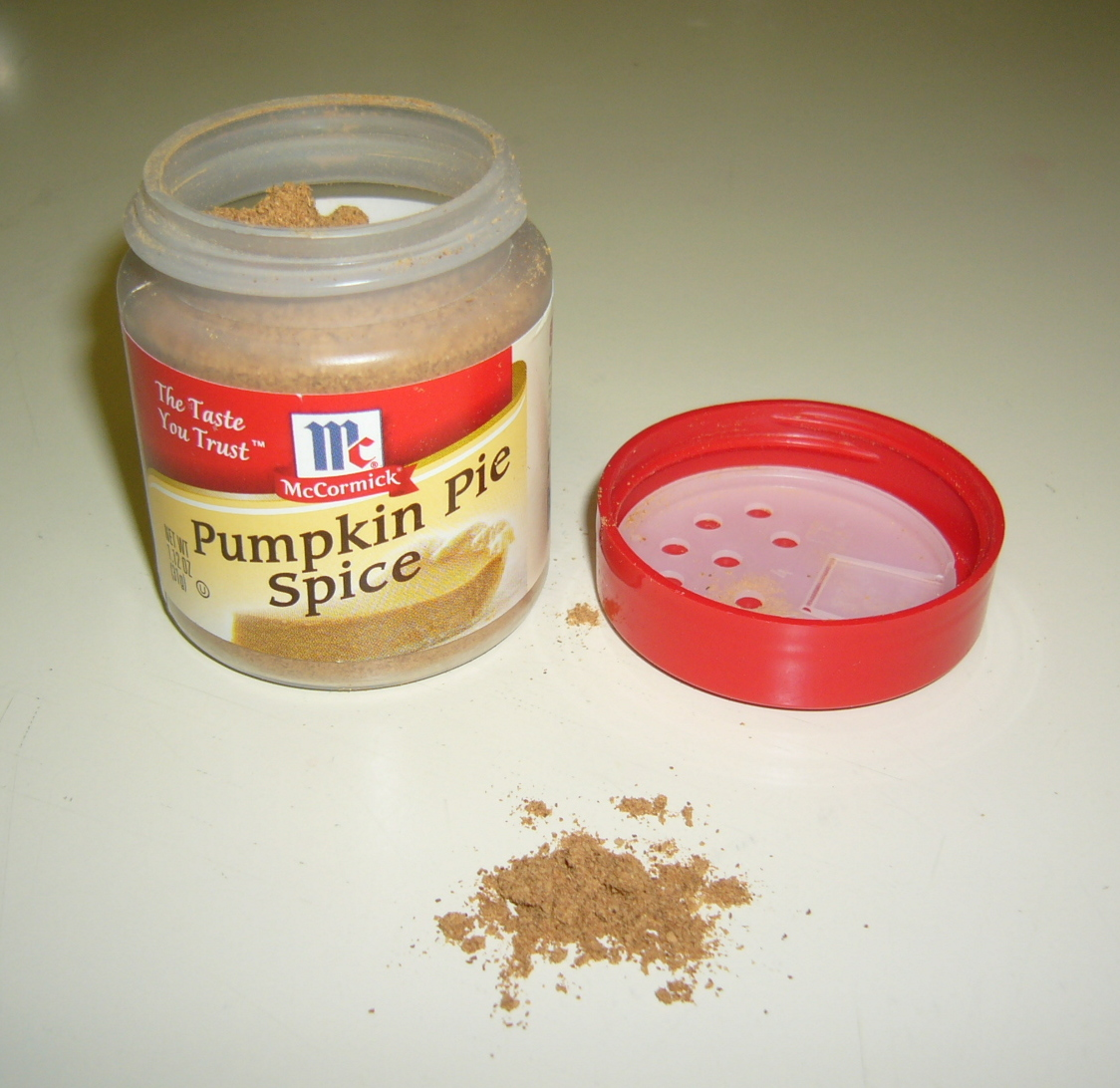
A container of pumpkin pie spice

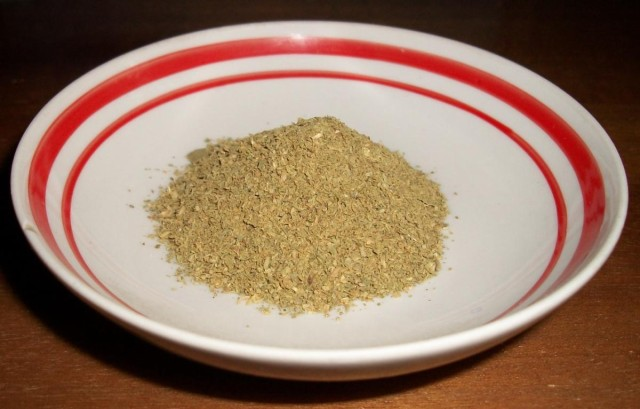
A bowl of khmeli suneli

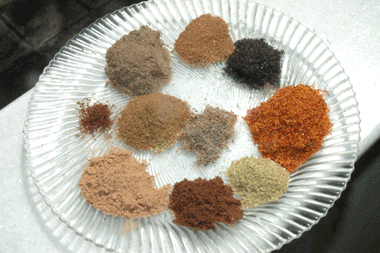
Ingredients for a Gulf-style baharat

=== Americas ===
- Jerk, a spicy Jamaican dry-rub for meat primarily made with allspice and Scotch bonnet peppers
- Montreal steak spice, a seasoning mix for steaks and grilled meats
- Old Bay Seasoning, a seasoning mix of celery salt, black pepper, crushed red pepper flakes, and paprika originally created in Baltimore and regionally popular in Maryland as well as Mid-Atlantic and Southern states, parts of New England, and the Gulf Coast
- Pumpkin pie spice, a North American blend of cinnamon, clove, ginger, nutmeg, and allspice
- Italian seasoning, a blend of rosemary, thyme, basil and oregano
- Seasoned salt, a blend of table salt, herbs and spices.
- Tony Chachere, a Creole/Cajun type seasoning - a blend of salt, red pepper, black pepper, chili powder, and dehydrated garlic.
- Tajín, a Mexican blend of chili powder, salt, and dehydrated lime juice

=== European ===
- Adobo, a marinade of paprika, oregano, salt, garlic, and vinegar originating in Iberia and widely adopted in Latin America and elsewhere; not to be confused by the Philippines preparation given the same name by colonial-era Spaniards
- Beau Monde seasoning, containing salt, onion powder and celery powder, sometimes with other ingredients
- Fines herbes, a French blend of parsley, chives, tarragon, and chervil for seasoning delicate dishes
- Garlic salt, a mixture of dried garlic and table salt
- Herbes de Provence, a Provençal blend of thyme, marjoram, rosemary, basil, bay leaf, and sometimes lavender
- Italian seasoning, a blend of oregano, thyme, basil, parsley, and sage
- Khmeli suneli, a blend used in Georgia and the Caucasus region
- Lemon pepper, a blend of lemon zest, cracked black peppercorns, salt, and spices
- Mixed spice or pudding spice, a British blend of cinnamon, nutmeg, allspice, and other spices
- Mulling spices, a European spice mixture of cinnamon, cloves, allspice, nutmeg and dried fruit
- Quatre épices, a French blend of ground pepper, cloves, nutmeg and ginger
- Seasoned salt, a blend of table salt, herbs, spices, other flavourings
- Sharena sol, a Bulgarian mixture of summer savory, paprika and salt, with other optional ingredients
- Vadouvan, French version of an Indian masala

=== Middle East and Africa ===
- Advieh, a spice mixture used in Iranian cuisine and Mesopotamian cuisine
- Afrinj, an Ethiopian blend that is milder than berbere or mitmita
- Baharat, used throughout the Middle East
- Berbere, an Eritrean and Ethiopian blend
- Duqqa, a blend popular in Egypt and its surroundings, made from nuts, spices and herbs
- Hawaij, Yemenite ground spice mixtures used primarily for soups and coffee
- Mitmita, an Ethiopian blend of African birdseye chili peppers, cardamom, cloves and salt
- Ras el hanout, a Maghrebi blend that includes cinnamon and cumin among other spices
- Qâlat daqqa, also known as Tunisian five-spice
- Tabil, a Tunisian spice mix made from herbs, spices, and sometimes roses
- Yaji, a Hausa spice mix for traditional suya and chichinga kebabs in Sahelian West Africa; made from cayenne, ginger, peppercorns, ground peanuts, dried onion, and chili
- Za'atar, a Middle Eastern mix which is both an individual herb and a blend of that herb with sesame seeds and sometimes dried sumac

=== East and Southeast Asian ===
- Bumbu, several Indonesian blends
- Five-spice powder, a blend of cassia (Chinese cinnamon), star anise, cloves, and two other spices, usually fennel seeds and Szechuan peppercorns
- Thirteen-spice powder (十三香), eight more (not always fixed) ingredients mixed with Five-spice powder
- Húng lìu, a Vietnamese blend
- Shichimi, a mix of ground red chili pepper, Japanese pepper, roasted orange peel, black and white sesame seed, hemp seed, ground ginger and nori

=== South Asia ===
- Bafat, used in Mangalorean cuisine
- Chaat masala, ground spices used for flavouring chaat
- Garam masala, most commonly used spice blend in the Indian subcontinent
- Kaala masala, black spice blend used in the Indian subcontinent
- Panch phoron, a five-spice blend of whole fenugreek, nigella, fennel, cumin, and mustard or radhuni seeds originating from the Indian subcontinent
- Tandoori masala, spice blend originating from the Indian subcontinent for tandoor-cooked meats
- Thuna paha, a spice blend of coriander, cumin and fennel seed used in traditional Sri Lankan cuisine

== See also ==
- List of culinary herbs and spices
- Seasoning
