= Spice =

Food flavouring

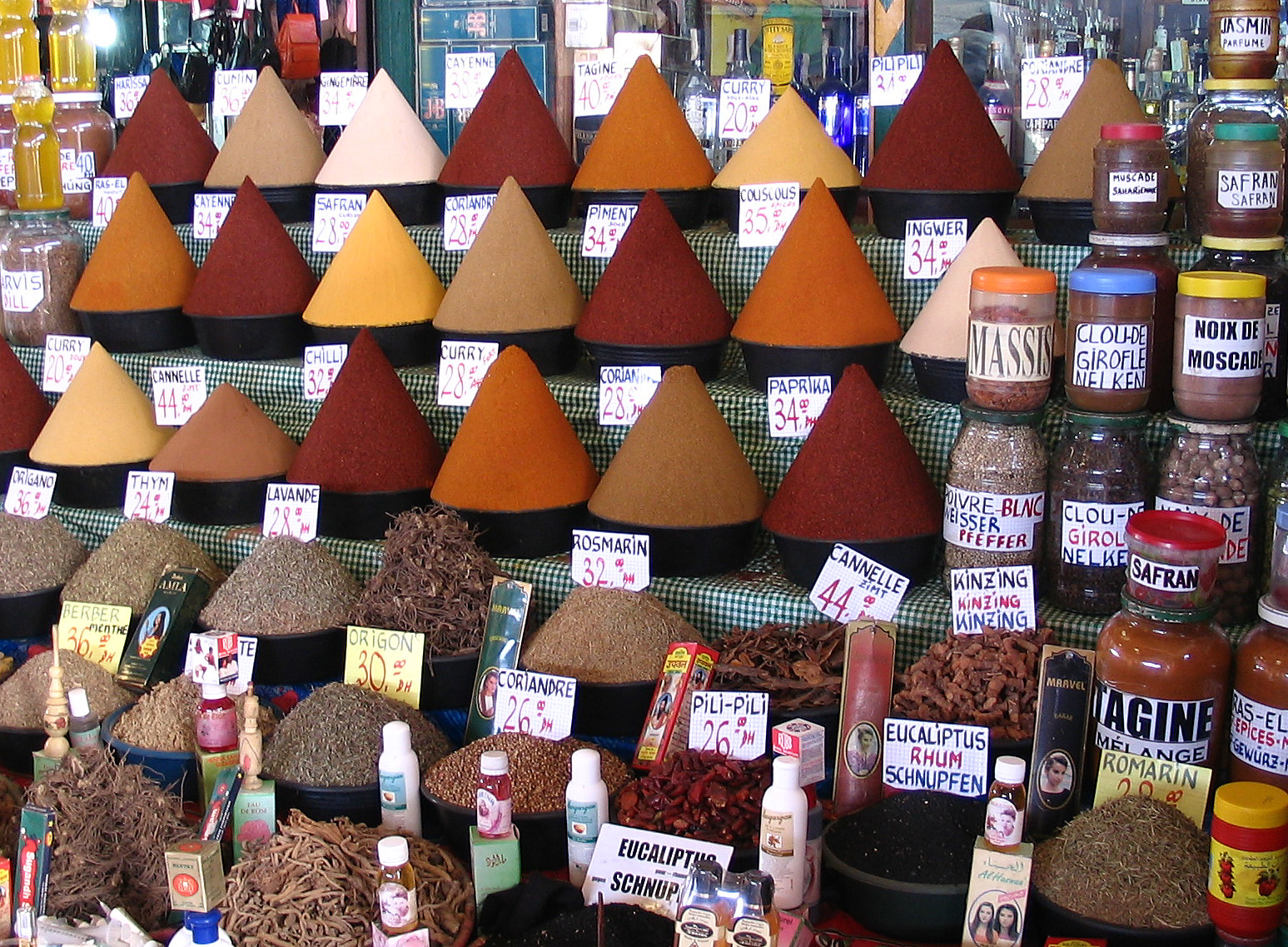
Spices at a central market in Agadir, Morocco

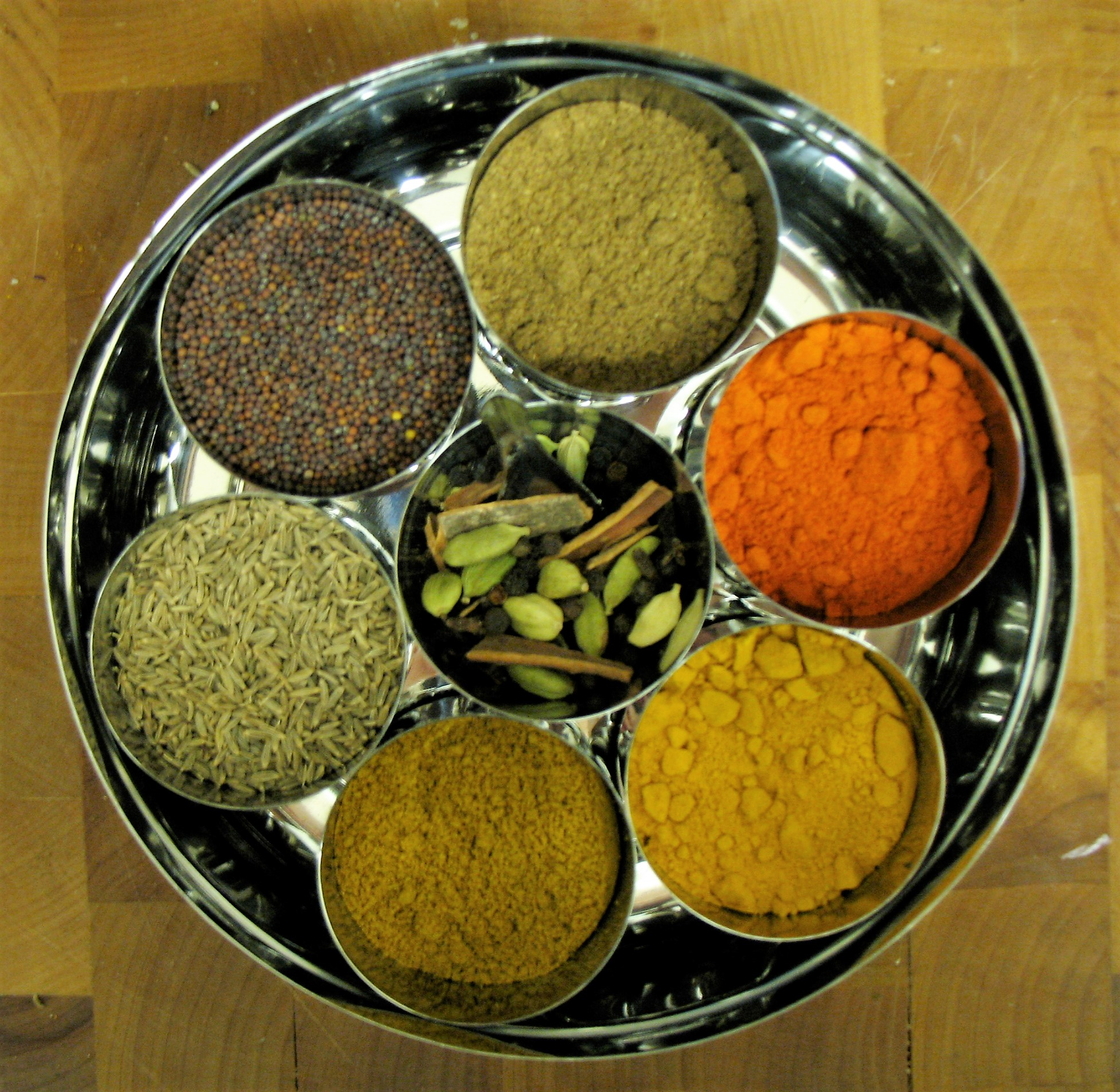
A group of Indian herbs and spices in bowls

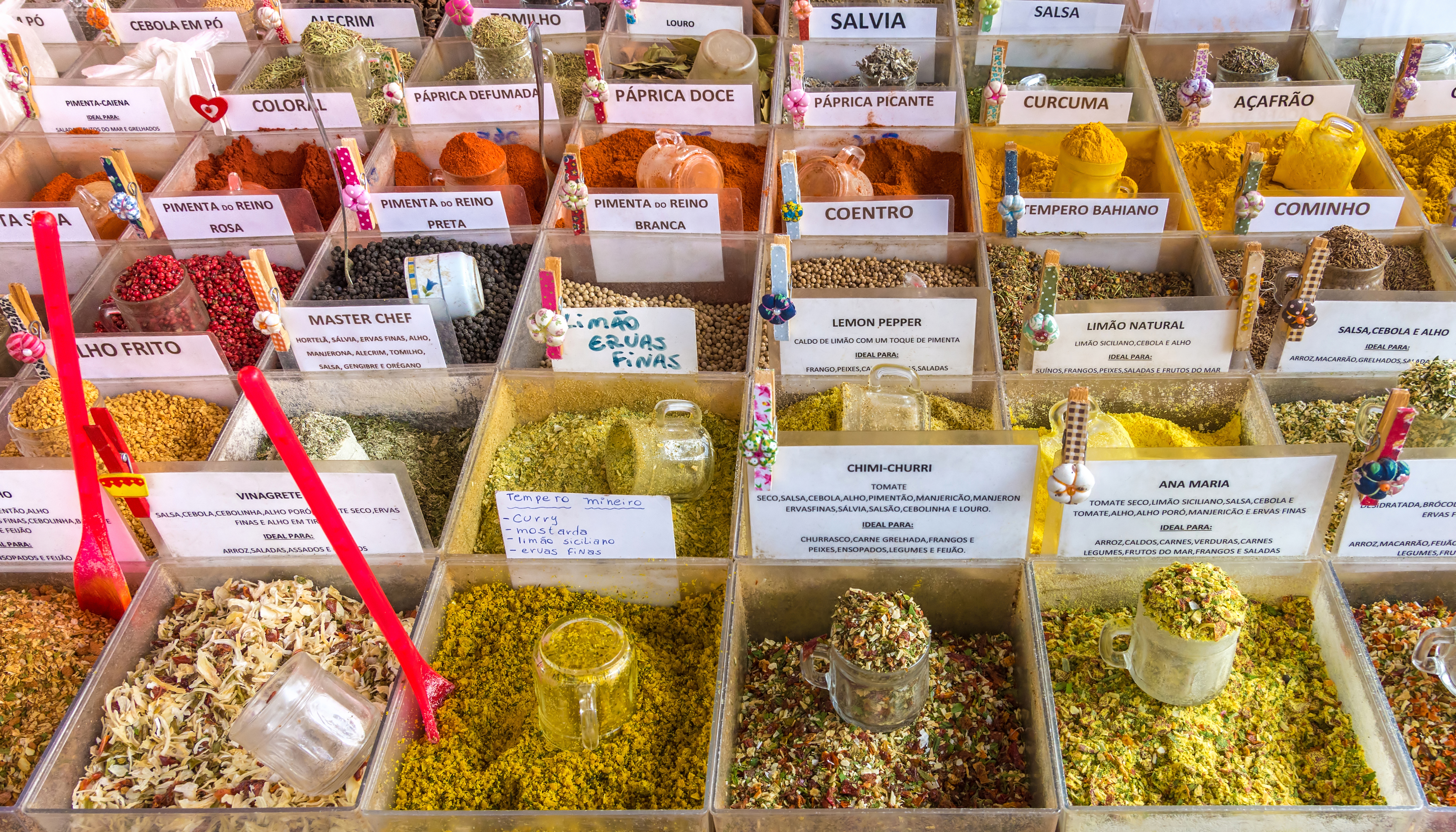
Spices of Saúde flea market, São Paulo, Brazil

In the culinary arts, a spice is a seed, fruit, root, bark, or other plant substance primarily used for flavouring or colouring food. Spices are distinguished from herbs, which are the leaves, flowers, or stems of plants used for flavouring or as a garnish. Spices and herbs are both seasonings. Spices are sometimes used in medicine, religious rituals, cosmetics, or perfume production. They are usually classified into spices, spice seeds, and herbal categories. For example, vanilla is commonly used as an ingredient in fragrance manufacturing. Plant-based sweeteners such as sugar are not considered spices.

Spices can be used in various forms, including fresh, whole, dried, grated, chopped, crushed, ground, or extracted into a tincture. These processes may occur before the spice is sold, during meal preparation in the kitchen, or even at the table when serving a dish, such as grinding peppercorns as a condiment. Certain spices are rarely available fresh or whole, and are typically purchased in ground form. Small seeds, such as fennel and mustard, can be used either in their whole form or as a powder.

A whole dried spice has the longest shelf life, so it can be purchased and stored in larger amounts, making it cheaper on a per-serving basis. A fresh spice, such as ginger, is usually more flavourful than its dried form, but fresh spices are more expensive and have a much shorter shelf life.

A 2019 review paper found that most claimed health benefits were not supported by clinical evidence, although noted that polyphenols found in spices may be beneficial.

India contributes to 75% of global spice production. This is reflected culturally through its cuisine. Historically, the spice trade developed throughout the Indian subcontinent as well as in East Asia and the Middle East. Europe's demand for spices was among the economic and cultural factors that encouraged exploration in the early modern period.

== Definition ==
Although defining spice is difficult, varying definitions cover several common aspects. One such aspect is the biological source of spices: the Oxford English Dictionary (OED) identifies the source as vegetables, while Redgrove (1933) is more specific as to the part of the plant, specifically the root, rhizome, flower, fruit, seed and bark when they are dried, in contrast with herbaceous parts which constitute herbs. The Oxford Companion to Food challenges the idea that spices sourced from plants are a hard rule, pointing to ambergris being often identified as a spice despite its animal origin.

Another aspect is the geographical source: The OED specifies spices are sourced from the tropics, while The Oxford Companion to Food gives the example of caraway seeds as demonstrating that spices can come from temperate climes. The notion that spices have a tropical origin is historic: originally "spice" was understood as a type of merchandise from the Orient. As Europeans encountered the Americas, beginning the Columbian exchange, the meaning expanded to capture new aromatics, and the meaning later shifted again to refer to culinary use. This historic development has led to some ingredients indigenous to European cooking such as garlic and horseradish not being considered spices despite sharing many attributes.

== History ==
=== Early history ===
Archeological study of early spice use is difficult, as spices were used in small quantities, leaving few preserved remains.

The spice trade developed throughout the Indian subcontinent and Middle East by 2000 BCE with cinnamon and black pepper, and in East Asia with herbs and pepper. The Egyptians used herbs for cuisine and mummification. Their demand for exotic spices and herbs helped stimulate world trade.

Cloves were used in Mesopotamia by 1700 BCE. (Note: A team of archaeologists led by Giorgio Buccellati excavating the ruins of a burned-down house at the site of Terqa, in modern-day Syria, found a ceramic pot containing a handful of cloves. The house had burned down around 1720 BC and this was the first evidence of cloves being used in the west before Roman times.) The earliest written records of spices come from ancient Egyptian, Chinese, and Indian cultures. The Ebers Papyrus from early Egypt dating from 1550 BCE describes some eight hundred different herbal medicinal remedies and numerous medicinal procedures.

By 1000 BCE, medical systems based on herbs could be found in China, Korea, and India. Early uses were associated with magic, medicine, religion, tradition, and preservation.

Indonesian merchants travelled around China, India, the Middle East, and the east coast of Africa. Arab merchants facilitated the routes through the Middle East and India. This resulted in the Egyptian port city of Alexandria being the main trading center for spices. The most important discovery before the European spice trade was the monsoon winds (40 CE). Sailing from Eastern spice cultivators to Western European consumers gradually replaced the land-locked spice routes once facilitated by the Middle Eastern Arab caravans.

Spices were prominent enough in the ancient world that they are mentioned in the Old Testament. In Genesis, Joseph was sold into slavery by his brothers to spice merchants. In Exodus, manna is described as being similar to coriander in appearance. In the Song of Solomon, the male narrator compares his beloved to many saffron, cinnamon, and other spices.

Historians believe that nutmeg, which originates from the Banda Islands in Southeast Asia, was introduced to Europe in the 6th century BCE. The Romans had cloves in the 1st century CE, as Pliny the Elder wrote about them.

=== Middle Ages ===
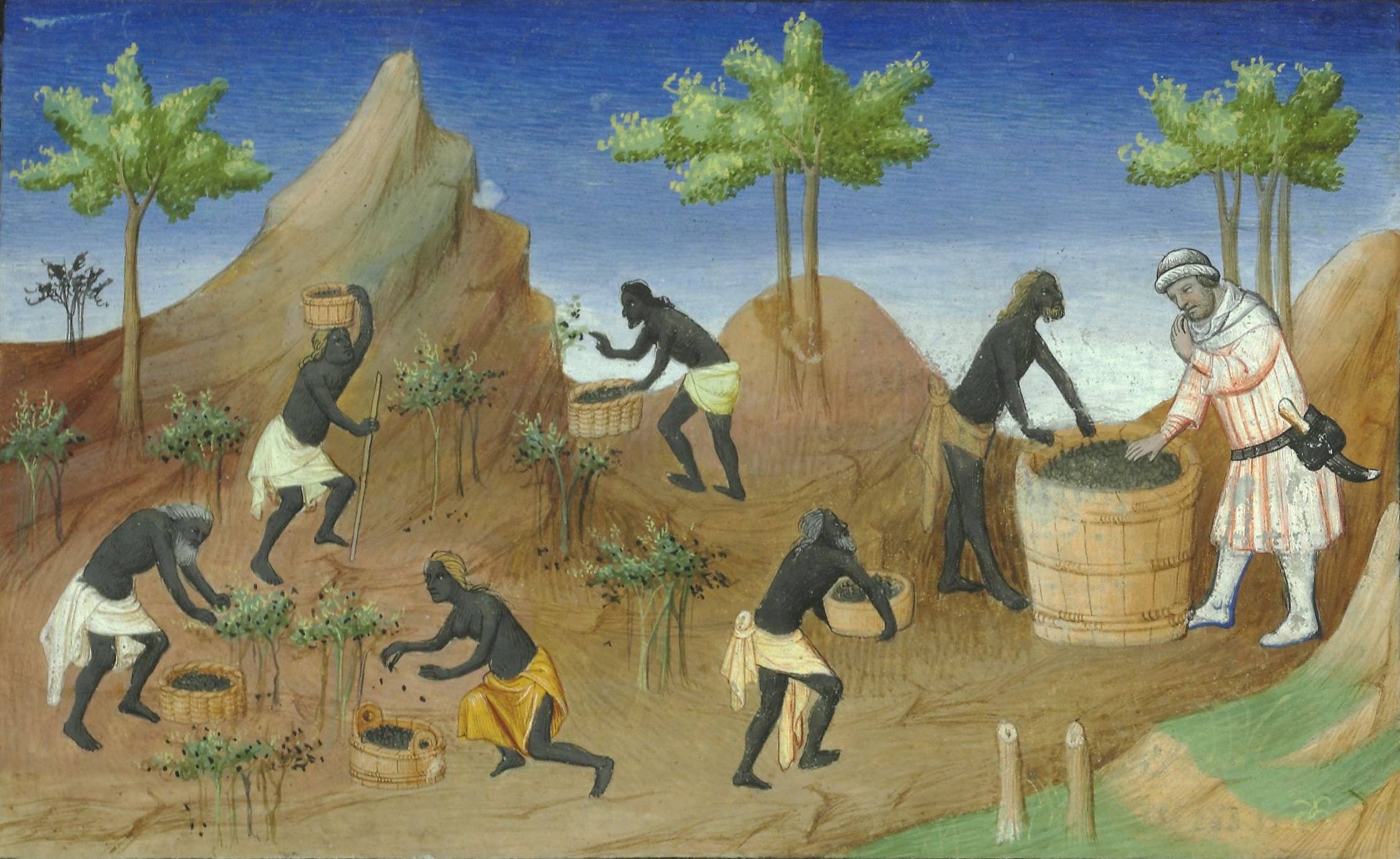
"The Mullus" harvesting pepper. Illustration from a French edition of The Travels of Marco Polo.

Spices were among the most demanded and expensive products available in Europe in the Middle Ages, the most common being black pepper, cinnamon (and the cheaper alternative cassia), cumin, nutmeg, ginger, and cloves. Given medieval medicine's main theory of humorism, spices and herbs were indispensable to balance "humors" in food, on a daily basis for good health at a time of recurrent pandemics. In addition to being desired by those using medieval medicine, the European elite also craved spices in the Middle Ages, believing spices to be from and a connection to "paradise". An example of the European aristocracy's demand for spice comes from the King of Aragon, who invested substantial resources into importing spices to Spain in the 12th century. He was specifically looking for spices to put in wine and was not alone among European monarchs at the time to have such a desire for spice.

Spices were all imported from plantations in Asia and Africa, which made them expensive. From the 8th until the 15th century, the Republic of Venice held a monopoly on the spice trade with the Middle East, using this position to dominate the neighbouring Italian maritime republics and city-states. The trade made the region rich. It has been estimated that around 1,000 tons of pepper and 1,000 tons of other common spices were imported into Western Europe each year during the Late Middle Ages. The value of these goods was the equivalent of a yearly supply of grain for 1.5 million people. The most exclusive was saffron, used as much for its vivid yellow-red color as for its flavor. Spices that have now fallen into obscurity in European cuisine include grains of paradise, a relative of cardamom which mostly replaced pepper in late medieval north French cooking, along with long pepper, mace, spikenard, galangal, and cubeb.

=== Early modern period ===
Voyagers from Spain and Portugal were interested in seeking new routes to trade in spices and other valuable products from Asia. The control of trade routes and the spice-producing regions were the main reasons that Portuguese navigator Vasco da Gama sailed to India in 1499. When da Gama discovered the pepper market in India, he was able to secure peppers for a much lower cost than demanded by Venice. At around the same time, Christopher Columbus returned from the New World. He described to investors the new spices available there. (Note: The word "ají" is still used in South American Spanish for chili peppers.)

Another source of competition in the spice trade during the 15th and 16th centuries was the Ragusans from the maritime republic of Dubrovnik in southern Croatia. The military prowess of Afonso de Albuquerque (1453–1515) allowed the Portuguese to take control of the sea routes to India. In 1506, he took the island of Socotra in the mouth of the Red Sea and, in 1507, Ormuz in the Persian Gulf. Since becoming the viceroy of the Indies, he took Goa in India in 1510, and Malacca on the Malay Peninsula in 1511. The Portuguese could now trade directly with Siam, China, and the Maluku Islands.

With the discovery of the New World came new spices, including allspice, chili peppers, vanilla, and chocolate. This development kept the spice trade, with the Americas as a latecomer with their new seasonings, profitable well into the 19th century.

== Function ==
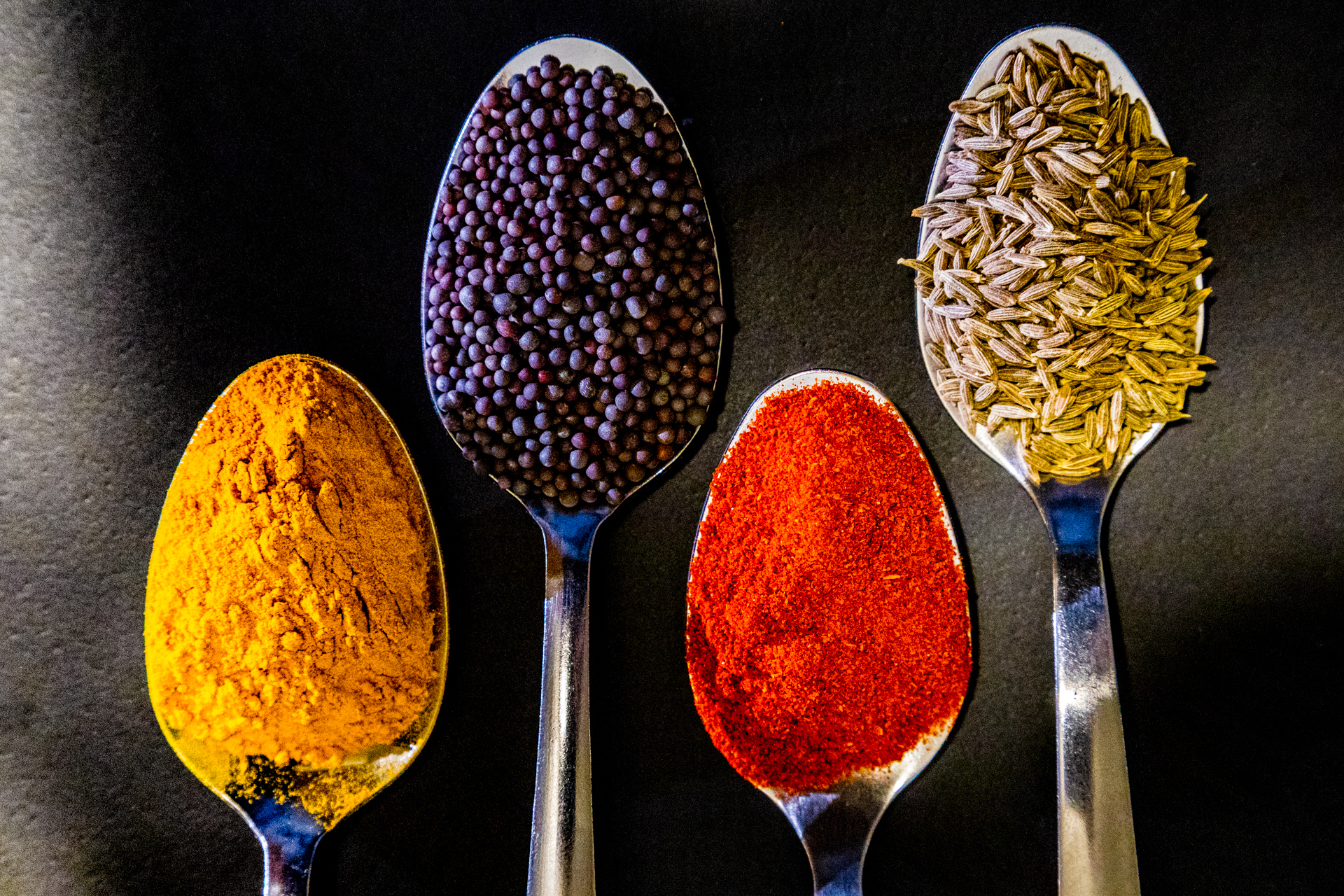
Turmeric powder, mustard seeds, chilli powder, cumin seeds

Spices are primarily used as food flavouring or to create variety. They are also used to perfume cosmetics and incense. At various periods, many spices were used in herbal medicine. Finally, since they can be expensive, rare and exotic commodities, their conspicuous consumption has often been a symbol of wealth and social class.

=== Preservative claim ===
The most popular explanation for the love of spices in the Middle Ages is that they were used to preserve meat from spoiling, or to cover up the taste of meat that had already gone off. This compelling but false idea constitutes something of an urban legend, a story so instinctively attractive that mere fact seems unable to wipe it out... Anyone who could afford spices could easily find meat fresher than what city dwellers today buy in their local supermarket.

It is often claimed that spices were used either as food preservatives or to mask the taste of spoiled meat, especially in the European Middle Ages. This is false. In fact, spices are rather ineffective as preservatives as compared to salting, smoking, pickling, or drying, and are ineffective in covering the taste of spoiled meat. Moreover, spices have always been comparatively expensive: in 15th-century Oxford, a whole pig cost about the same as a pound of the cheapest spice, pepper. There is also no evidence of such use from contemporary cookbooks: "Old cookbooks make it clear that spices weren't used as a preservative. They typically suggest adding spices toward the end of the cooking process, where they could have no preservative effect whatsoever." Indeed, Cristoforo di Messisbugo suggested in the 16th century that pepper may speed up spoilage.

Though some spices have antimicrobial properties in vitro, pepper—by far the most common spice—is relatively ineffective, and in any case, far cheaper salt is also far more effective.

== Classification and types ==
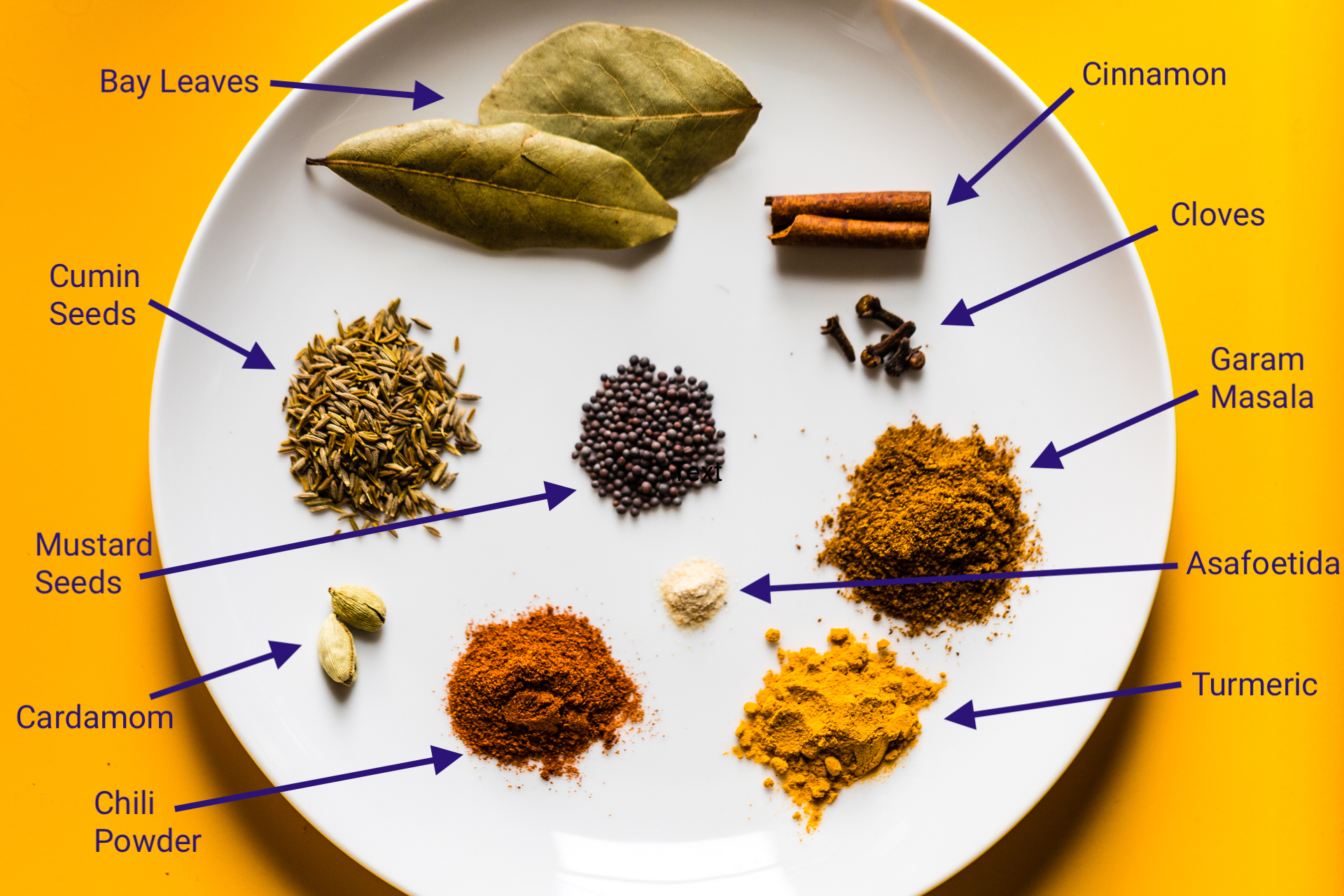
A plate of Indian herbs and spices

=== Botanical basis ===
- Seeds, such as fennel, mustard, nutmeg, and black pepper
- Fruits, such as cayenne pepper and Chimayo pepper
- Arils, such as mace (part of nutmeg plant fruit)
- Barks, such as true cinnamon and cassia
- Flower buds, such as cloves
- Stigmas, such as saffron
- Roots and rhizomes, such as turmeric, ginger and galangal
- Resins, such as asafoetida

=== Common spice mixtures ===
- Advieh (Iran)
- Baharat (Arab world, and the Middle East in general)
- Berbere (Ethiopia and Eritrea)
- Yaji (spice blend) (Nigeria)
- Bumbu (Indonesia)
- Cajun (United States)
- Chaat masala (Indian subcontinent)
- Chili powder and crushed red pepper (Cayenne, Chipotle, Jalapeño, New Mexico, Tabasco, and other cultivars)
- Curry powder
- Five-spice powder (China)
- Garam masala (Indian subcontinent)
- Harissa (North Africa)
- Hawaij (Yemen)
- Jerk spice (Jamaica)
- Khmeli suneli (Georgia)
- Masala (a generic name for any mix used in the Indian subcontinent)
- Mixed spice (United Kingdom)
- Panch phoron (Indian subcontinent)
- Pumpkin pie spice (United States)
- Quatre épices (France)
- Ras el hanout (North Africa)
- Sharena sol (literally "colorful salt", Bulgaria)
- Shichimi tōgarashi (Japan)
- Speculaas (Belgium and Netherlands)
- Thuna Paha (Sri Lanka)
- Vegeta (Croatia) and a generic name for the staple brand in Central and Eastern Europe
- Za'atar (Middle East)

== Handling ==
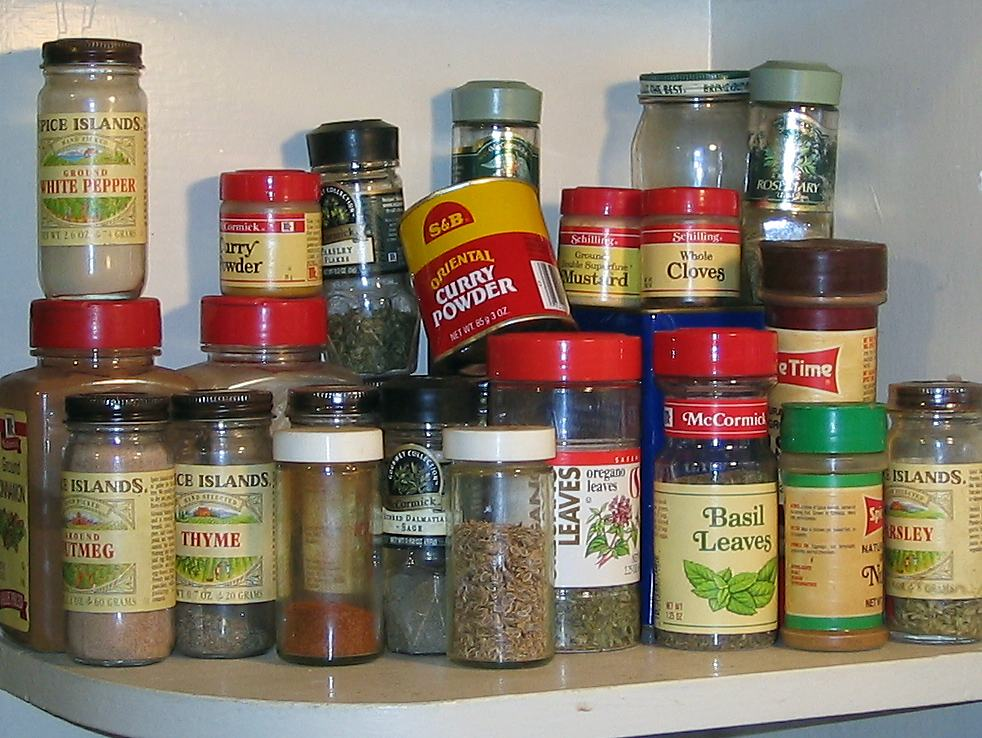
A shelf of common spices in a home kitchen

Pepper mill

A mortar and pestle is the classic set of tools for grinding a whole spice. Less labour-intensive tools are more common now: a microplane or fine grater can be used to grind small amounts; a coffee grinder (Note: Other types of coffee grinders, such as a burr mill, can grind spices just as well as coffee beans.) is useful for larger amounts. A frequently used spice such as black pepper may merit storage in its own hand grinder or mill.

The flavor of a spice is derived in part from compounds (volatile oils) that oxidise or evaporate when exposed to air. Grinding a spice greatly increases its surface area and so increases the rates of oxidation and evaporation. Thus, the flavor is maximised by storing a spice whole and grinding when needed. The shelf life of a whole dry spice is roughly two years; of a ground spice roughly six months. The "flavor life" of a ground spice can be much shorter. (Note: Nutmeg, in particular, suffers from grinding and the flavor will degrade noticeably in a matter of days.) Ground spices are better stored away from light. (Note: Light contributes to oxidation processes.)

Some flavor elements in spices are soluble in water; many are soluble in oil or fat. As a general rule, the flavours from a spice take time to infuse into the food so spices are added early in preparation. This contrasts with herbs which are usually added late in preparation.

=== Salmonella contamination ===
A study by the Food and Drug Administration of shipments of spices to the United States during fiscal years 2007–2009 showed about 7% of the shipments were contaminated by Salmonella bacteria, some of it antibiotic-resistant. As most spices are cooked before being served Salmonella contamination often has no effect, but some spices, particularly pepper, are often eaten raw and are present at the table for convenient use. Shipments from Mexico and India, a major producer, were the most frequently contaminated. Food irradiation is said to minimise this risk.

== Production ==
Top Spice Producing Countries (in metric tonnes)
Rank	Country	2010	2011
1	India	1,474,900	1,525,000
2	Bangladesh	128,517	139,775
3	Turkey	107,000	113,783
4	China	90,000	95,890
5	Pakistan	53,647	53,620
6	Iran	18,028	21,307
7	Nepal	20,360	20,905
8	Colombia	16,998	19,378
9	Ethiopia	27,122	17,905
10	Sri Lanka	8,293	8,438
—	World	1,995,523	2,063,472
Source: UN Food & Agriculture Organization

== Standardization ==
The International Organization for Standardization addresses spices and condiments, along with related food additives, as part of the International Classification for Standards 67.220 series.

== Gallery ==
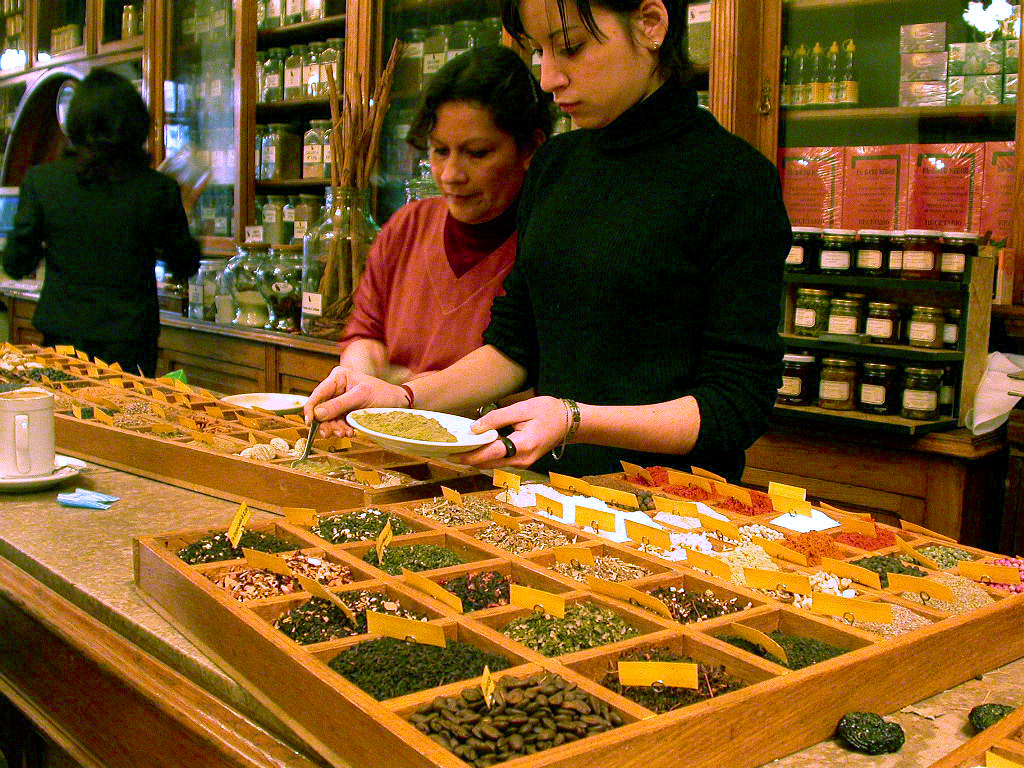
The Gato Negro café and spice shop (Buenos Aires, Argentina)

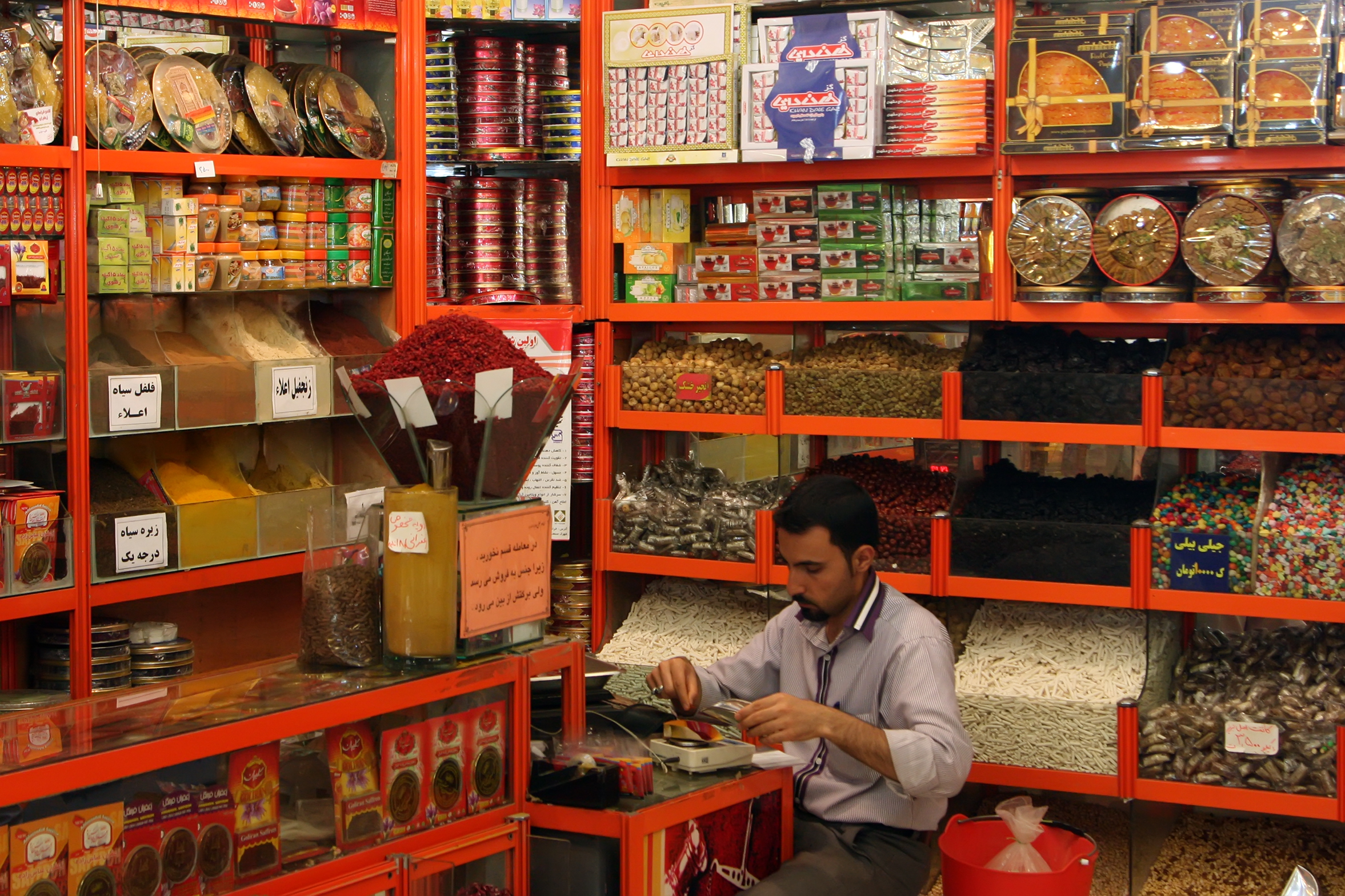
A spice shop selling a variety of spices in Iran

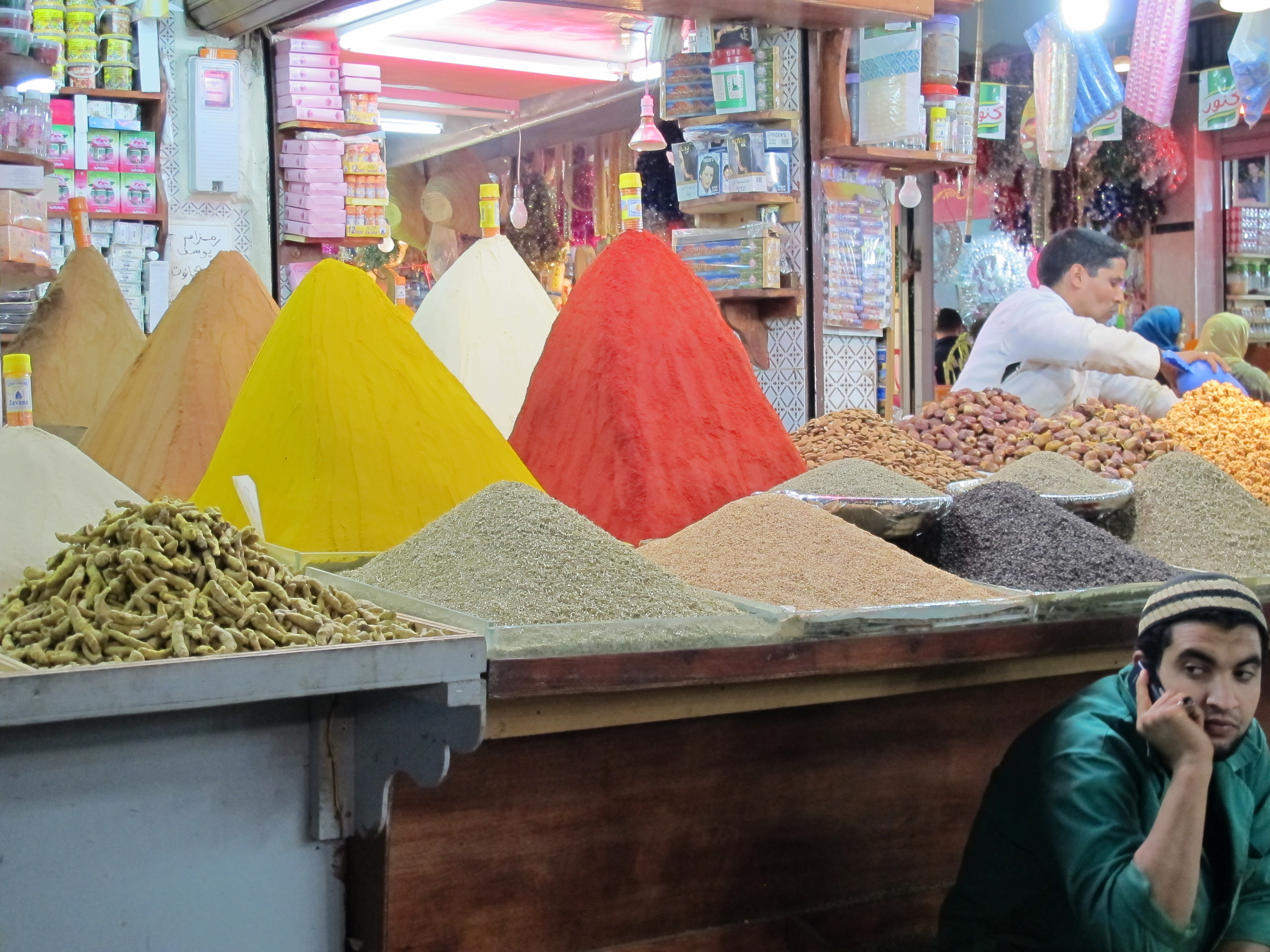
Night spice shop in Casablanca, Morocco

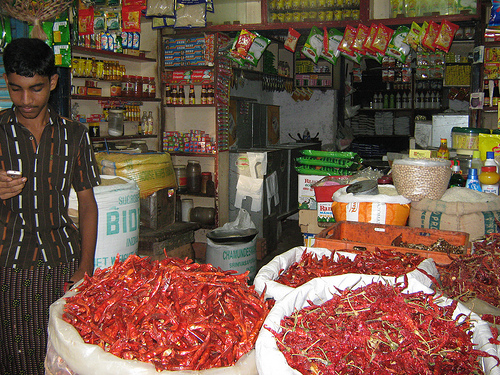
A spice shop in Taliparamba, India

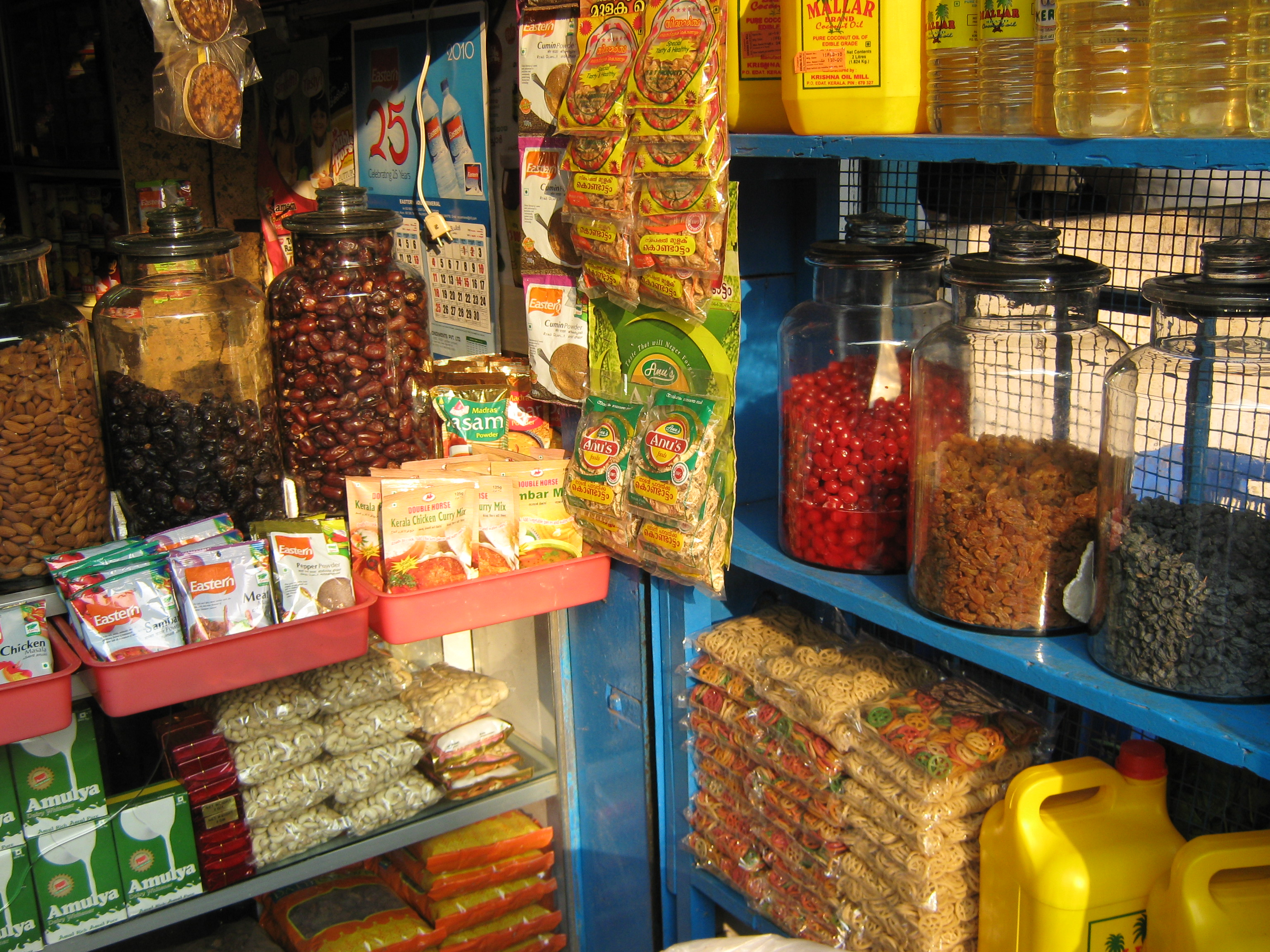
Spices sold in Taliparamba, India

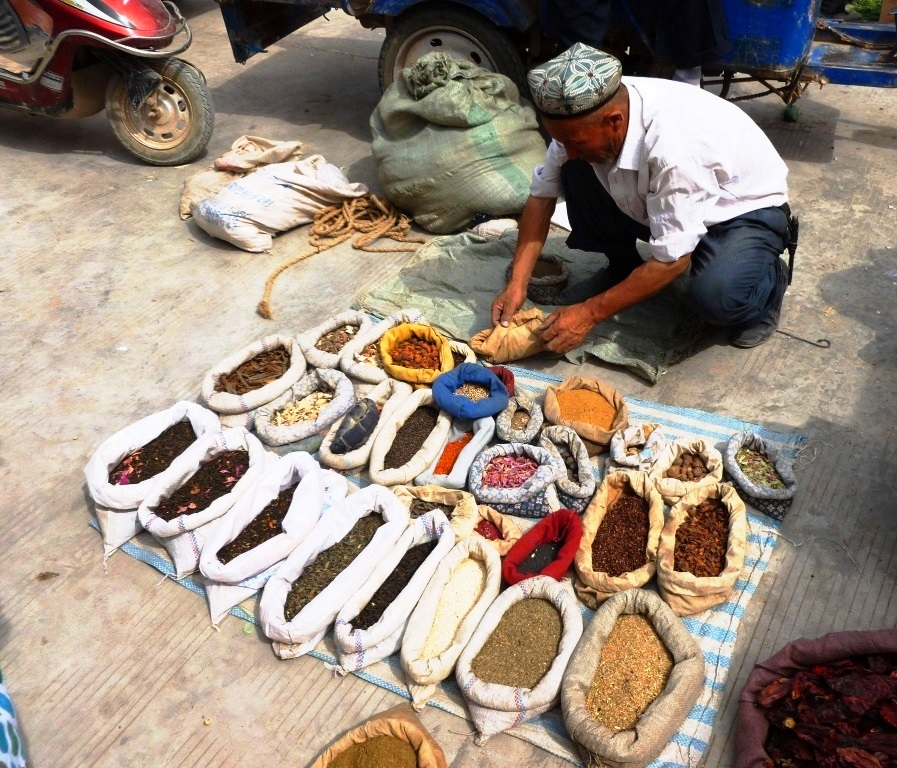
Spice seller at a market in Kashgar, China

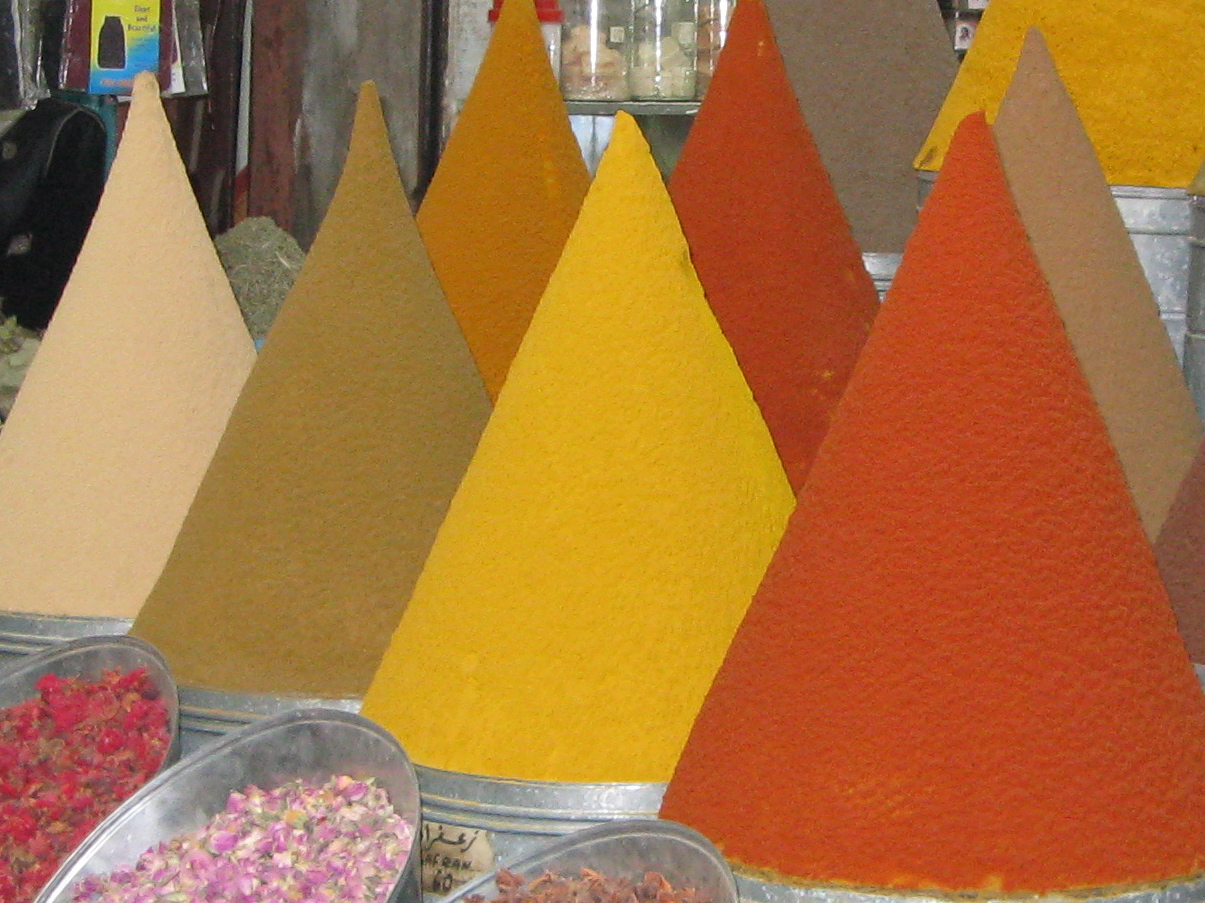
Spice market, Marrakesh, Morocco

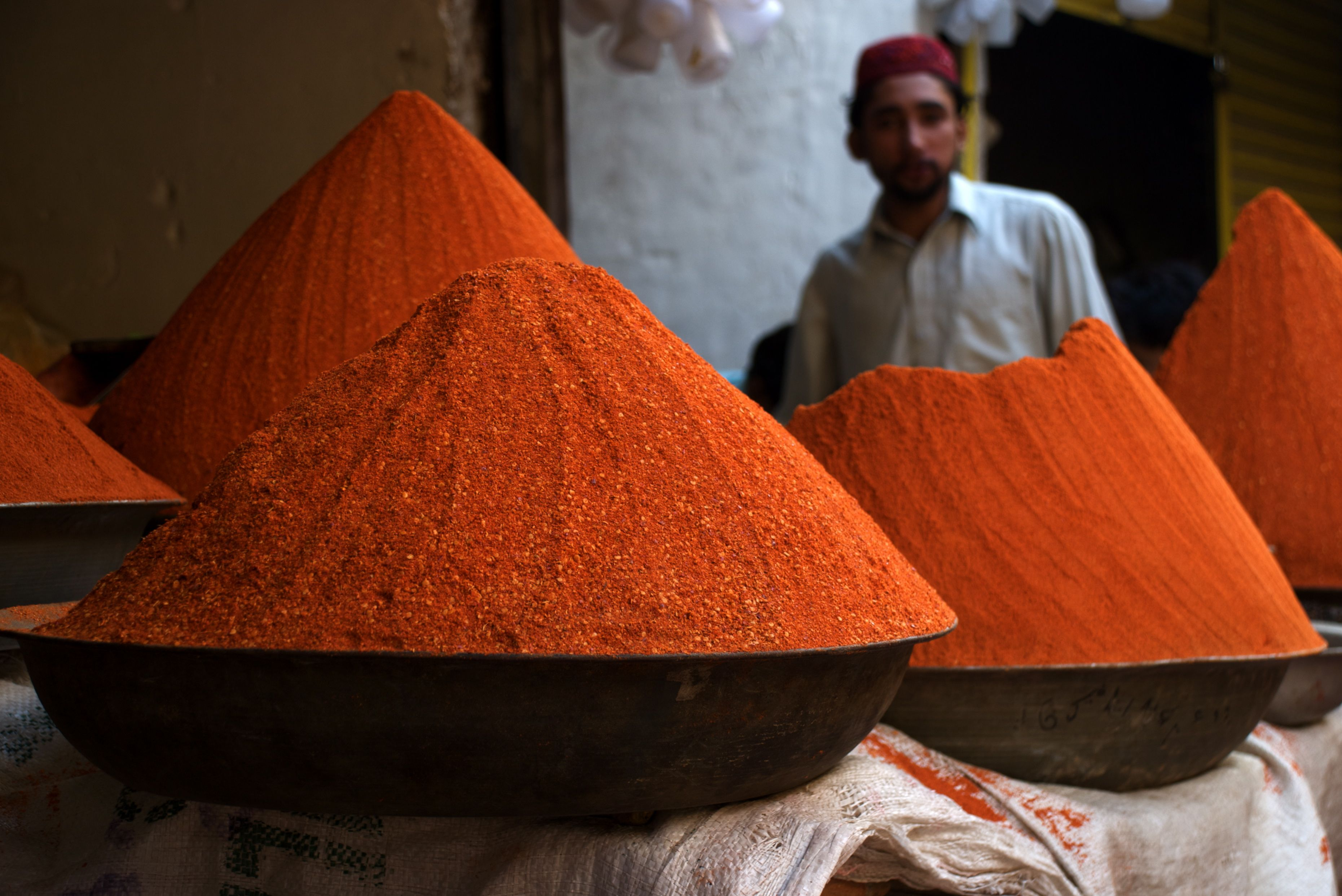
Spice shop in Bahawalpur, Pakistan.

== See also ==
- Tempering (spices), technique to extract essential oils from whole spices
- Spice rub, spices rubbed onto food before cooking

== Sources ==
- Davidson, Alan; Jaine, Tom (2014). The Oxford Companion to Food (3rd ed.). Oxford University Press. ISBN 9780191756276.
