= White sauce (Virginia) =

Dipping sauce in Virginia

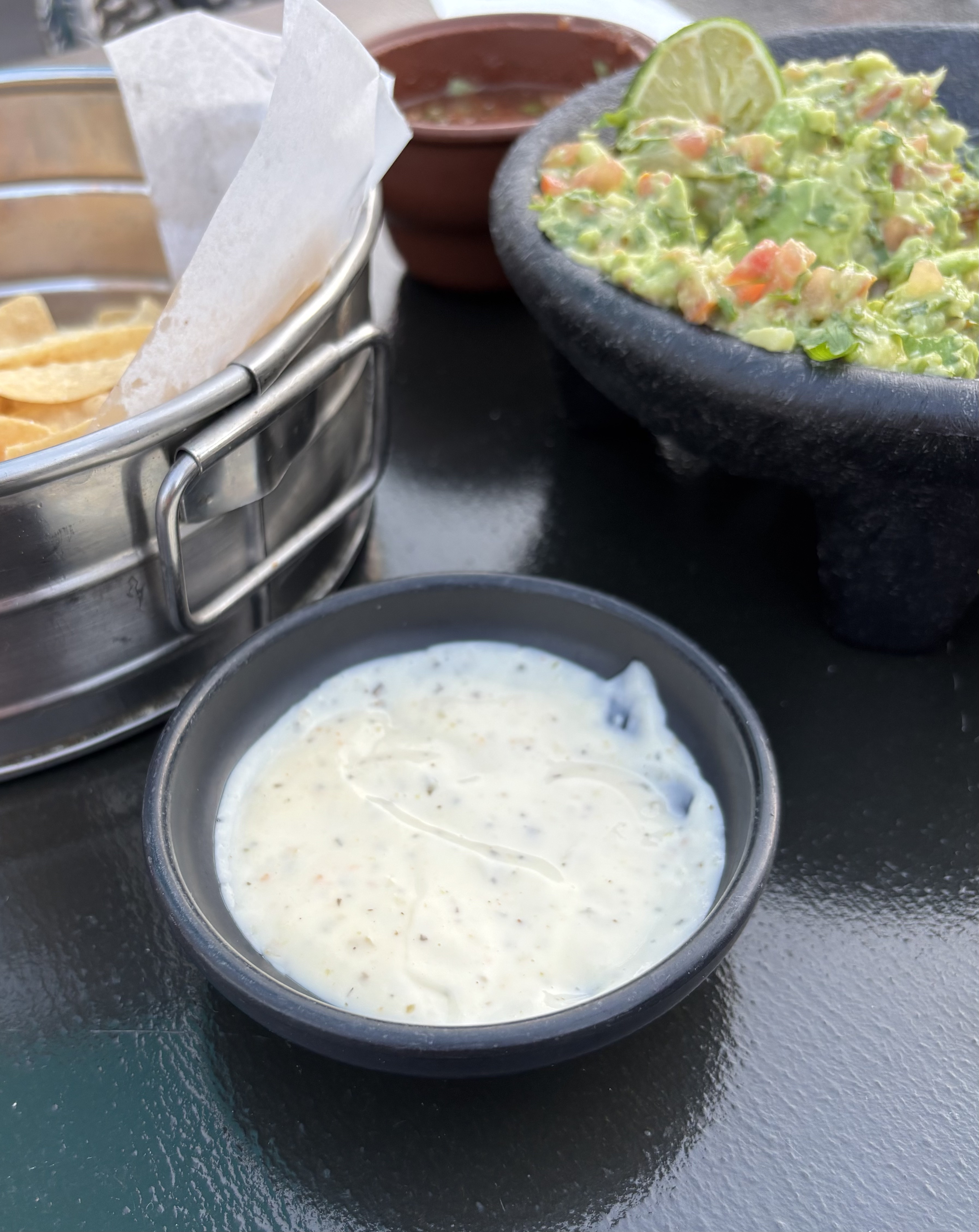
- White salsa, served along with tortilla chips, guacamole, and red salsa
- Alternative names: Salsa blanca
- Type: Dipping sauce
- Course: Appetizer
- Place of origin: Southeastern Virginia
- Associated cuisine: Mexican-American cuisine

White sauce, also known as salsa blanca, is a creamy, zesty condiment that is offered as a dipping sauce at Mexican restaurants in parts of the U.S. state of Virginia.

== Composition ==
The white sauce served in southeastern Virginian Mexican restaurants is traditionally made with Miracle Whip, milk, cumin, dried oregano (or Italian seasoning), garlic powder, and crushed red pepper flakes. The sauce then sits, refrigerated, for at least 48 hours for the flavors to meld and grow bolder. Some restaurants, including the large Plaza Azteca chain, make the recipe somewhat differently, with onions, garlic, and crushed peppers, and both La Costeña jalapeños and their juice; this version is also served fresh. Many restaurants are protective of their customized recipes for the condiment.

Despite its resemblance to queso, the sauce does not contain cheese. It bears similarities to ranch dressing, with a more intense flavor, described as "cool and hot at the same time".

== History ==
The dipping sauce, known simply as white sauce, salsa blanca, or white salsa, is popular in southeastern Virginia, around the Hampton Roads area, where it is ubiquitous at local Mexican restaurants. While largely unknown outside of this region, it can occasionally be found at restaurants in other states, particularly in northern North Carolina, and among families in Jalisco, Mexico, who have relatives in Hampton Roads. It is usually offered as a complimentary dipping sauce alongside tortilla chips and the more common red salsa.

The sauce was popularized by a restaurant in Norfolk, Virginia, known as El Toro, which began serving the condiment in the 1970s—first as a salad dressing, and eventually as a dip. Its true origins are somewhat disputed, and some say El Toro's sauce was likely adapted from a version served at a local chain run by Mexican American restaurateur John Villareal a decade earlier. While none of El Toro's employees at the time white sauce grew in popularity were from Mexico, when Mexican American entrepreneurs began opening their own restaurants in the area in the mid-1990s, customers requested the "white salsa", so they began serving it, too.

A possibly related dipping sauce, made with sour cream rather than Miracle Whip, has been found in Richmond-area Mexican restaurants as well.
