= Garam masala =

South Asian spice mix

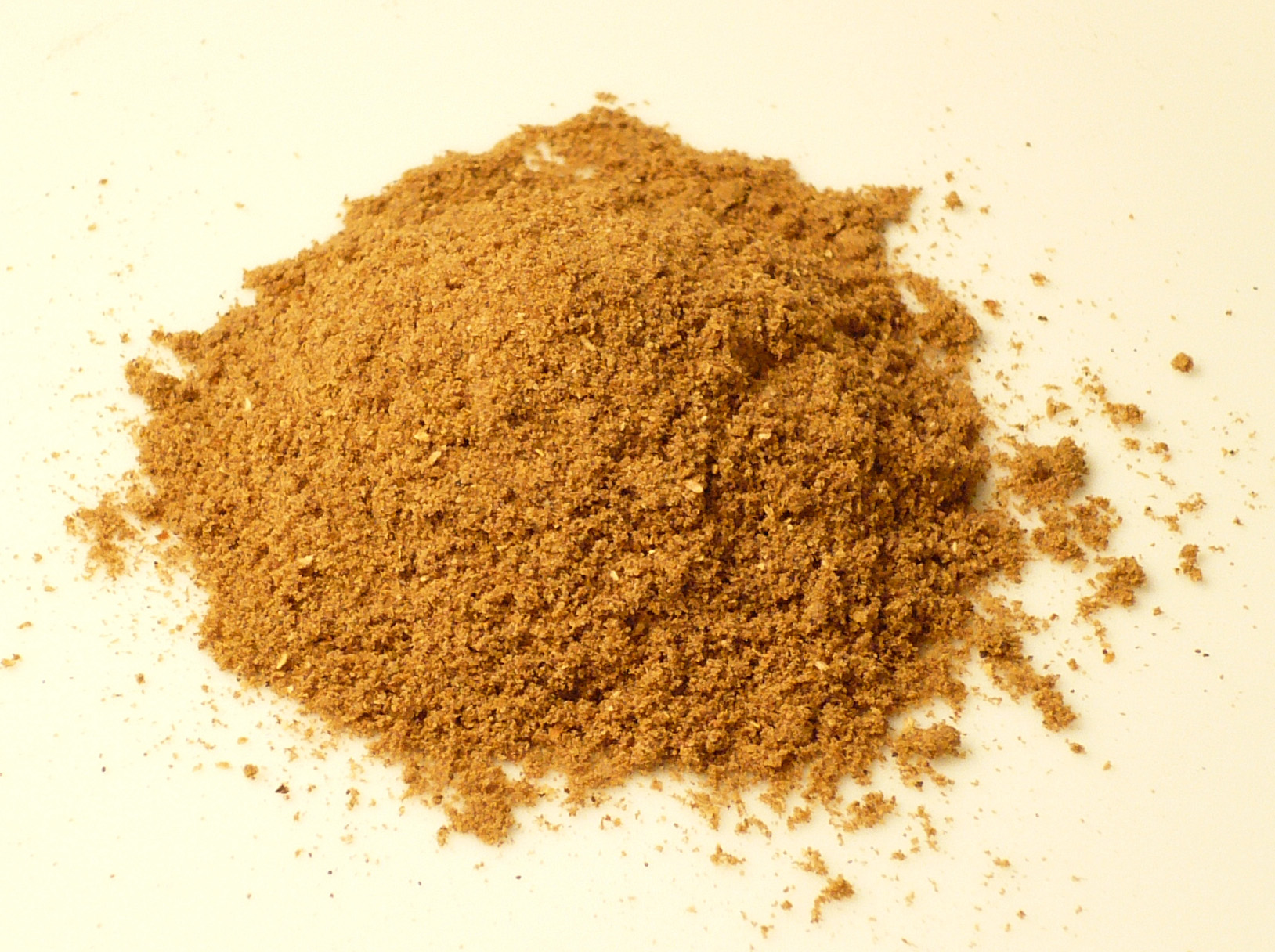
Ground garam masala

Garam masala (Hindustani: garam masālā, lit. 'hot or warm spices') is a blend of ground spices originating in the Indian Subcontinent. It is common in Indian, Pakistani, Nepalese, and Bangladeshi cuisines. It is used alone or with other seasonings. The specific combination differs by region, but it regularly incorporates a blend of flavours like cardamom, cinnamon, cumin, cloves, bay leaves, star anise, and peppercorns. Garam masala is used in a wide range of dishes, including marinades, pickles, stews, and curries.

== Ingredients ==
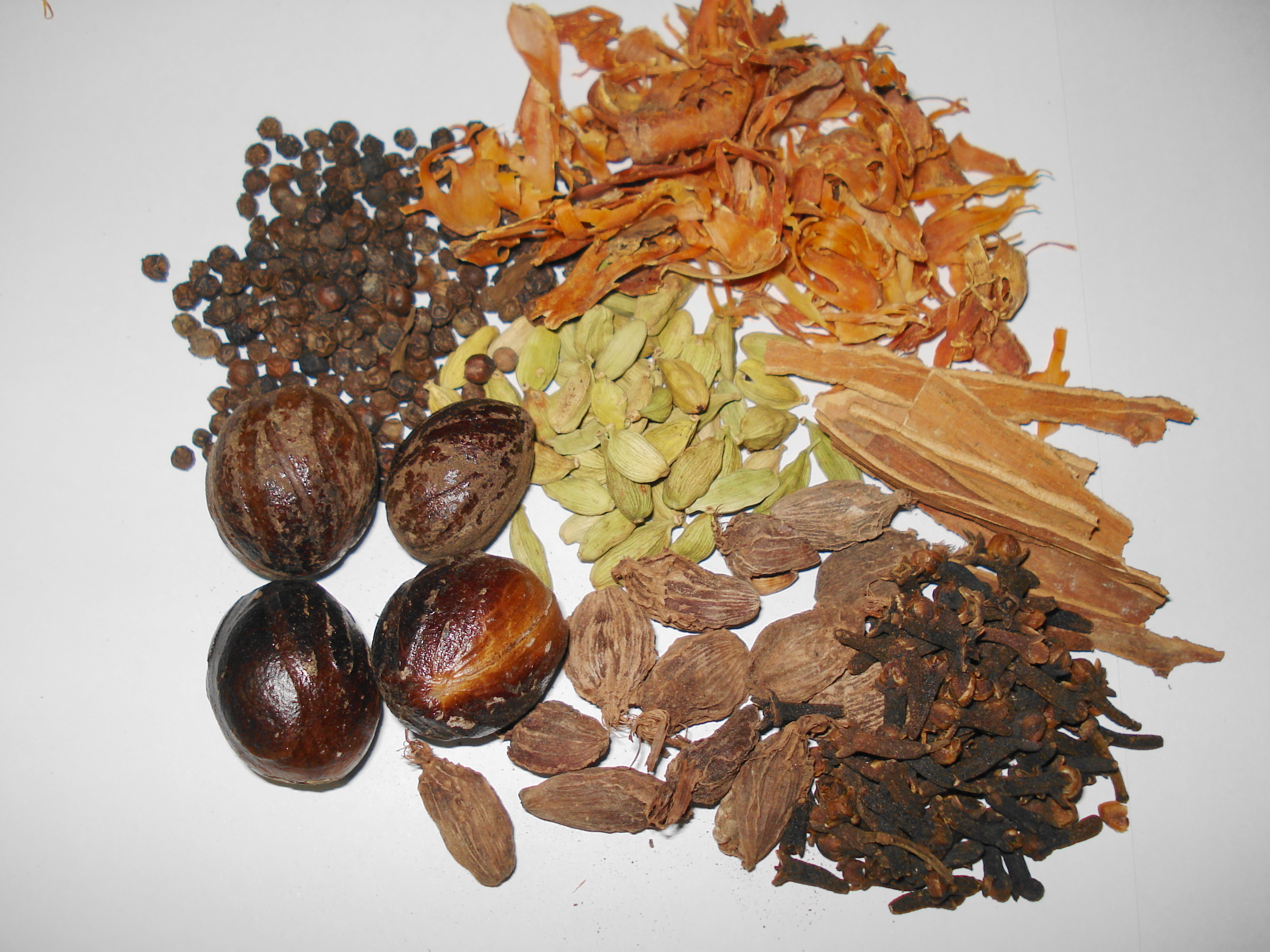
Typical ingredients for a garam masala (clockwise from upper left): black peppercorns, mace, cinnamon, cloves, black cardamom, nutmeg, and green cardamom

The composition of garam masala differs regionally, with many recipes across the Indian subcontinent according to regional and personal taste, and none are considered more authentic than another. The components of the mix are roasted, then ground together or added to the dish for flavour just before finishing the cooking.

A typical Indian version of garam masala contains (with Hindustani names in parentheses):

- Fennel (sauṅf)
- Indian bay leaves or malabathrum (tej pattā)
- Black and white peppercorns (kāli/safed mirch)
- Cloves (lauṅg)
- Cinnamon or cassia bark (dālacīnī)
- Mace (outer covering of nutmeg) (javitri)
- Black and green cardamom pods (ilāīcī)
- Cumin (jīra)
- Coriander seeds (dhaniā)
- Red chili powder (lāl mirch)

Some recipes call for the spices to be blended with herbs, while others call for the spices to be ground with water, vinegar, or other liquids to make a paste. Some recipes include nuts, onions or garlic, or small quantities of star anise, asafoetida, chili, stone flower (known as dagadphool, lichen), and kababchini (cubeb). The flavours may be blended to achieve a balanced effect, or a single flavour may be emphasised. A masala may be toasted before use to release its flavours and aromas. In the east of the Indian subcontinent, in West Bengal, Odisha, Assam and Bangladesh only cardamom, cinnamon and clove may be substituted for the assortment.

The Burmese masala (မဆလာ) spice blend used in Burmese curries typically consists of ground cinnamon or cassia, cardamom, cloves, and black pepper.

== See also ==
- Baharat
- Chaat masala
- Curry powder
- Panch phoron (Indian five-spice blend)
- Chinese five-spice blend
- Tikka masala
