= Yaji =

Yaji may refer to:

- Yaji I, a Hausa king (reigned 1349-1385)
- Yaji II, a Hausa king (reigned 1753-1768)
- Yaji (spice blend), a West African spice blend
