= Vadouvan =

Spice blend of French-Indian heritage

Vadouvan (occasionally spelled vaudouvan), or French curry, is a ready-to-use blend of spices that is a French derivative of a masala known as vadavam, vadagam, or vadakam. It is a curry blend with added aromatics such as shallots and garlic. The spice blend is thought to have originated from French colonial influence in the Puducherry region of India.

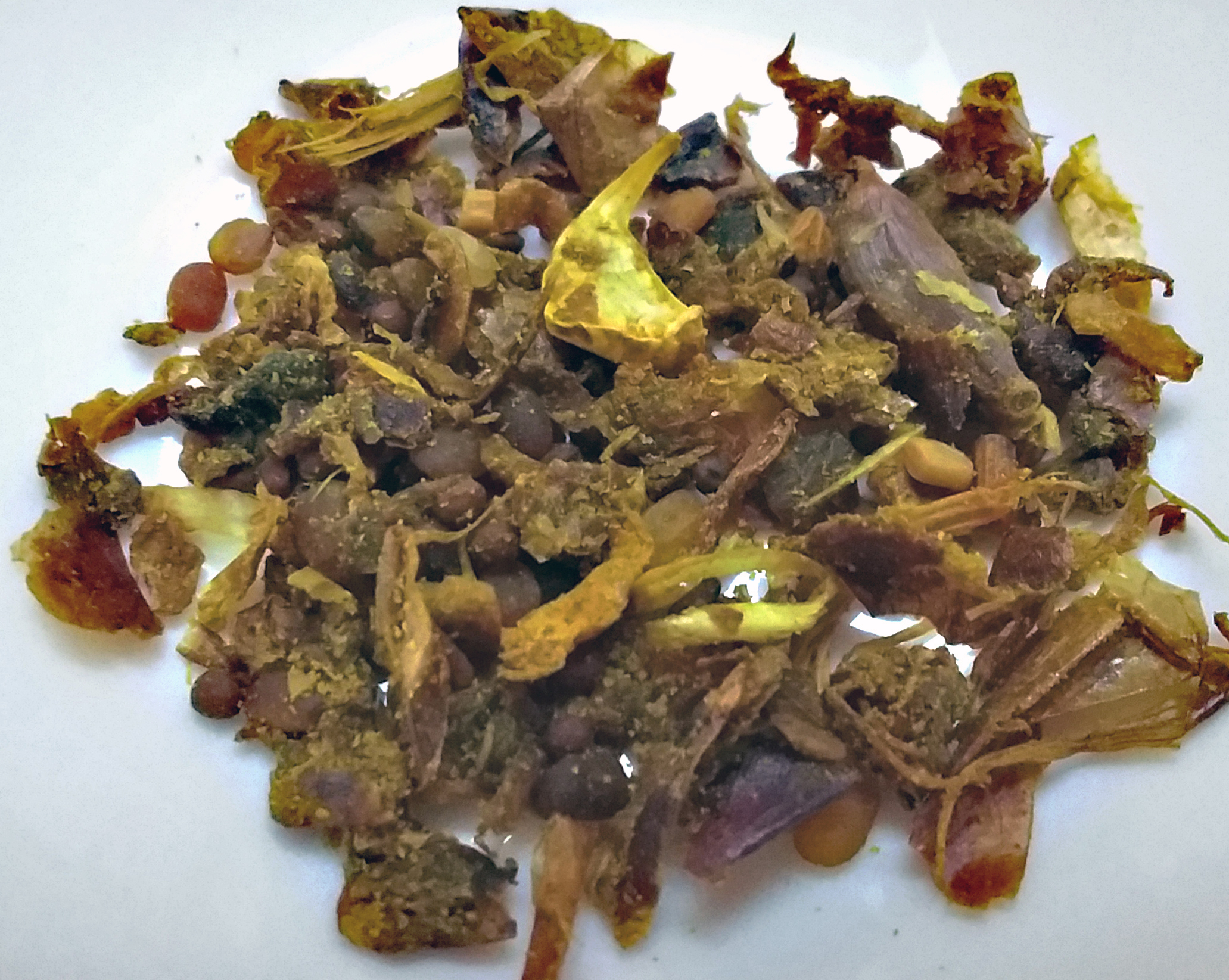
Vadouvan

Indian recipes for vadouvan blends vary but, at a minimum, must contain pounded onion, garlic, cumin seeds, mustard seeds and fenugreek. The mixture is dried in the sun and then crushed, mixed with castor oil, which has preservative properties, and rolled into balls, which are then dried for several more days.

Similarly, Western recipes for vadouvan use onions, garlic, spices and oil, but the drying is done using an oven.

== See also ==
- List of herbs and spices
- Seasoning
