= Herbes de Provence =

Blend of dried herbs

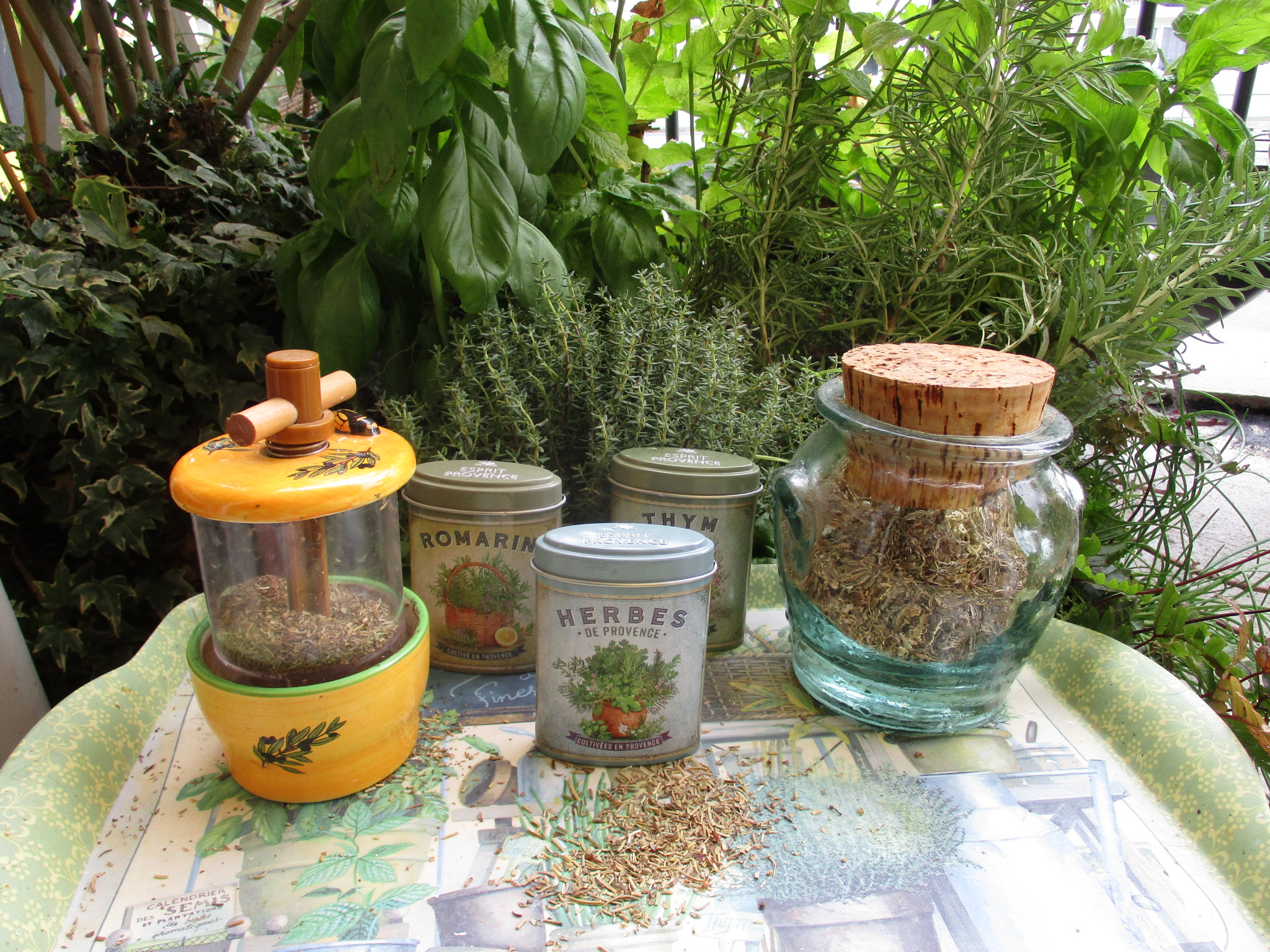
Herbes de Provence is a mix of dry ingredients

Herbes de Provence (French: [ɛʁb də pʁɔvɑ̃s]; Provençal: èrbas de Provença, [ˈɛr.bas də pɾoˈvɛn.sa]) is a mixture of dried herbs considered typical of the Provence region of southwestern France. Formerly simply a descriptive term, commercial blends started to be sold under this name in the 1970s. These blends often contain savory, marjoram, rosemary, thyme, oregano, tarragon, basil, bay leaves, and black pepper. Lavender leaves or buds are also sometimes included in North American formulations. The herb mixture is typically used with grilled foods, stews, and soups.

== History ==
...the famous mixtures of herbes de Provence... were unknown to my Provençal grandmothers, who used, individually and with discernment, thyme, rosemary and savory gathered in the countryside.

Provençal cuisine uses many herbs which are often characterized collectively as herbes de Provence, but not in specific combinations, and not historically sold as a mixture. It was in the 1970s that varying mixtures were formulated by spice wholesalers, including Ducros in France, which is now part of McCormick & Company.

== Origin ==
The commercial name herbes de Provence has no Protected Geographical Status or other legal definition. Indeed, only 10% of herbes de Provence sold in France are produced in France; 95% come from Central European (especially Poland) and Eastern European (notably Albania) countries, the Maghreb region of Northwest Africa, or China. Herbes de Provence are often sold in larger bags than other herbs, and the price in Provence is considerably lower than for other herbs.

== Herbes mix ==
Herbes de Provence mixtures typically contain a combination of savory, marjoram, rosemary, thyme, oregano, with other herbs, such as basil, bay leaf, tarragon, summer savory, parsley, and fennel, as well as chervil and hyssop, added or substituted by region. In the North American market, for example, lavender leaves are typically included with the base herbs, though lavender does not appear in the recipes in Jean-Baptiste Reboul's 1910 compendium of Provençal cooking.

The French Label Rouge quality assurance definition is 19% thyme, 27% rosemary, 27% savory, and 27% oregano.

== Uses ==
Herbes de Provence are primarily used to flavour grilled foods such as fish and meat, and vegetable stews. The mixture can be added to foods before, during, or after cooking, or mixed with cooking oil and lightly roasted before cooking. They can also be incorporated in vinaigrettes, sprinkled on raw foods such as salads, or used to season fresh cheese, such as goat cheese rolled in herbes de Provence.

== See also ==
- Italian seasoning, a similar blend
- List of herbs
- Fines herbes
