= Italian seasoning =

Herb blend

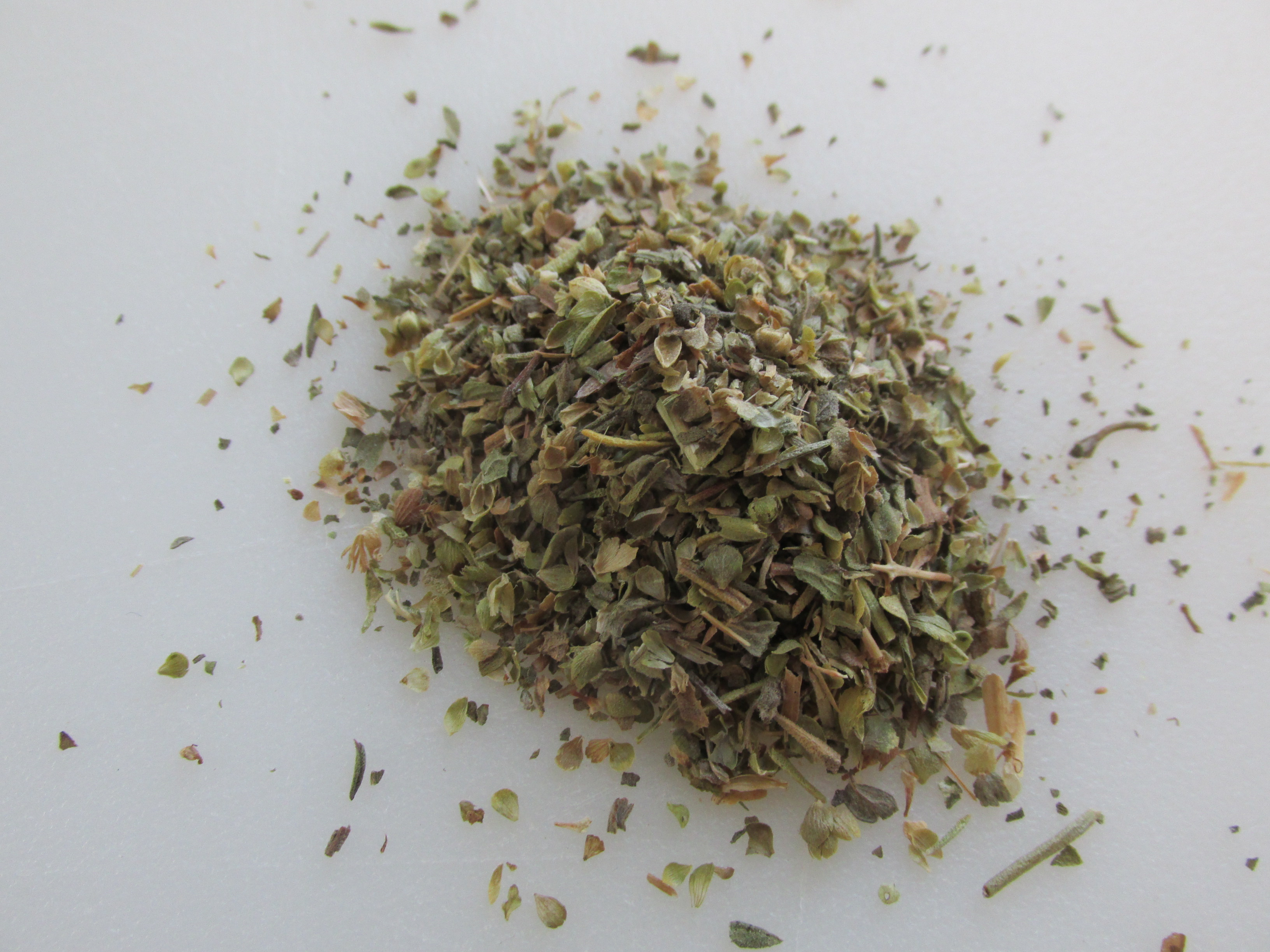
A U.S. Italian seasoning mix

Italian seasoning is a blend of dried aromatic herbs that primarily includes basil, oregano, rosemary, thyme, and marjoram as its base. Many Italian ground seasoning blends may also include some of the following spices: parsley, sage, savory, coriander, mint, crushed red pepper, or garlic powder.

Pre-blended dry herb mixtures are not common in Italy, and Italian seasoning is not found there. However, seasoned salts, such as salamoia bolognese (consisting of rosemary, sage, garlic, salt, and black pepper), are used.

== See also ==
- Herbes de Provence, a similar mixture
