= Amchoor =

Dried unripe mango powder

Amchoor (आमचूर, āmacūra), also aamchur, amchur or mango powder, is a fruity spice powder made from dried unripe green mangoes. A citrusy seasoning, it is mostly produced in India. In addition to its use as a seasoning it adds the nutritional benefits of mangoes when the fresh fruit is out of season.

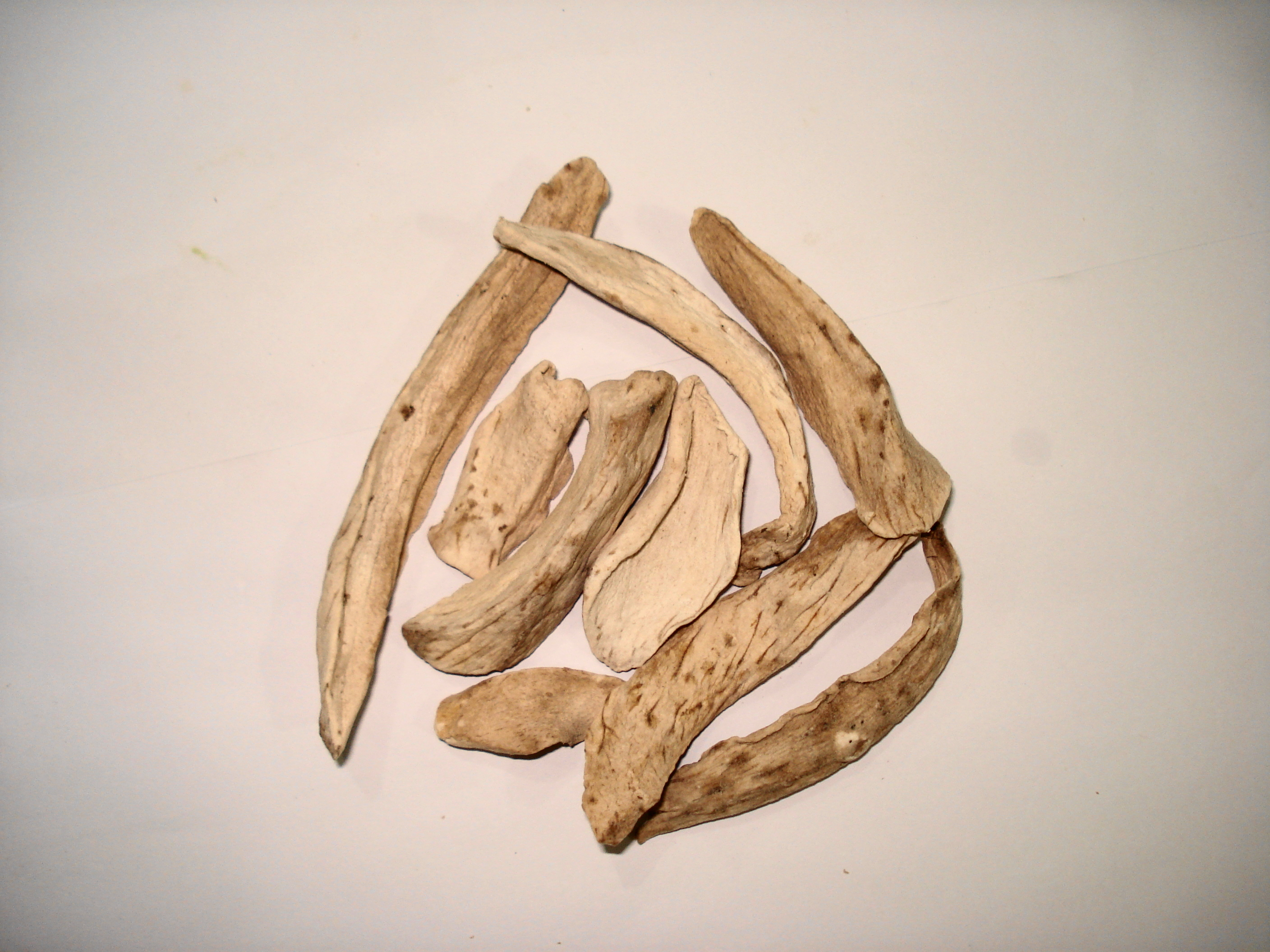
Dried mango slices

== Preparation ==
To make amchoor, early-season mangoes are harvested while still green and unripe. Once harvested, the green mangoes are peeled, thinly sliced, and sun-dried. The dried slices, which are light brown and resemble strips of woody bark, can be purchased whole and ground by the individual at home, but the majority of the slices processed in this way are ground into fine powder and sold as ready-made amchoor.

== Use ==
It has a honey-like fragrance and a sour fruity flavour and is a tart pale-beige-to-brownish powder. It is used in dishes where acidity is required, in stir fried vegetable dishes, soups, curries, and to tenderize meat and poultry. It is used to add a fruit flavour without adding moisture, or as a souring agent, and lends an acidic taste to the foods.

Amchoor is a predominant flavouring agent used in Indian dishes where it is used to add a sour tangy fruity flavour without moisture. It is used to flavour samosa and pakora fillings, stews and soups, fruit salads and pastries, curries, chutneys, pickles and dals and to tenderize meats, poultry, and fish. It is added to marinades for meat and poultry as an enzymatic tenderizer and lends its sourness to chutneys and pickles. Amchoor is also a primary component of chaat masala, an Indian spice mix.
