= Kala masala =

Indian spice mixture

Kala masala is a spice mixture (masala) from the Maharashtra state of India. The Maharashtra region has a variety of masalas which distinguish Maharashtrian food from other aromas and flavours of India. Stronger and spicier flavours are significant aspects of Maharashtra. This special masala makes it easy to prepare Maharashtrian items like usal, varan and masale bhat.

Some of the main ingredients of kala masala are cumin seeds, coriander seeds, cloves, cinnamon sticks, stone flower, coconut, sesame seeds and chillies. "Kala" means "black" in the Marathi language and this refers to both the colour of the final masala and the ingredients which it contains. Typically, it will be prepared from dark spices such as cloves and cinnamon and the spices will be roasted until they obtain a dark colour.
