= Chaat masala =

Spice mix, used in Pakistani and Indian cuisine

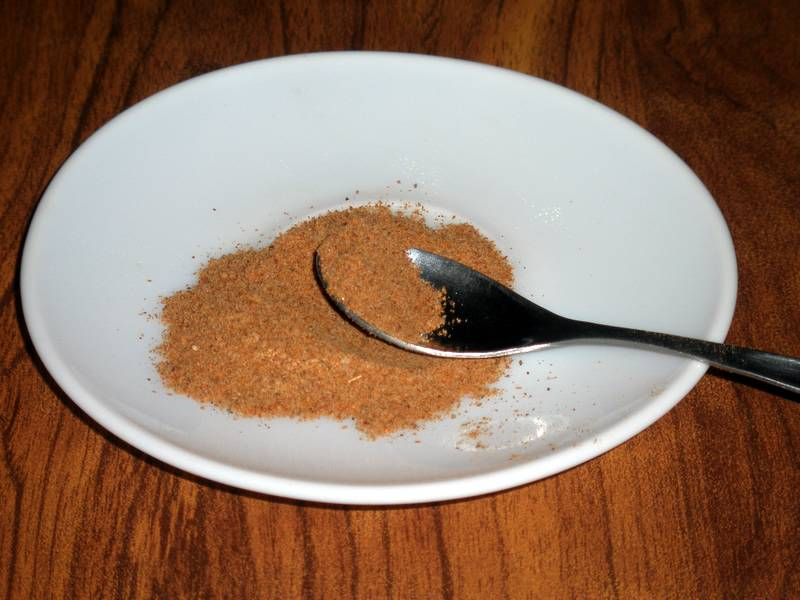
Chaat masala

Chaat masala, also spelled chat masala (चाट मसाला), is a powdered spice mix, or masala, originating from the Indian subcontinent, typically used to add flavor to chaat. It typically consists of amchoor (dried mango powder), cumin, coriander, dried ginger, salt (often black salt), black pepper, asafoetida, and chili powder. Garam masala is optional.

== Uses ==
Beyond its use in preparing chaat, chaat masala finds use in Indian fruit salads made with papaya, sapodilla, apples and bananas. Chaat masala is also sprinkled on potatoes, fruit, egg toast and regular salads in India.

Spice brands market an alternate spice mix called fruit chaat masala, which contains less cumin, coriander, and ginger, but more chili pepper, black salt, amchoor and asafoetida. Street vendors usually mix their own chaat masala, which is sprinkled on chopped-up fruit or fresh vegetables (such as raw white radish in the northern regions of the Indian subcontinent). Sometimes black salt with chili powder alone is used.

== Health ==
Some ingredients in the chaat masala are beneficial for health. Cumin helps in digestion and may lower cholesterol levels. Black pepper supports metabolism and nutrient absorption while coriander helps in detoxification. Dried ginger has anti-inflammatory properties that aids digestion. A 2022 review by ResearchGate on Indian spices confirmed that many traditional Indian spice mixes contain compounds with antioxidant and antimicrobial activity, which may help in immune function and metabolic balance.

The chaat masala spice mix sometimes can become unhealthy when overused or accompanies fried and high-calorie food. Too much of salt, preservatives and artificial flavoring in some spice mix can overtime contribute to bloating, water retention and high blood pressure.
