= Chili powder =

Spice made from chili peppers

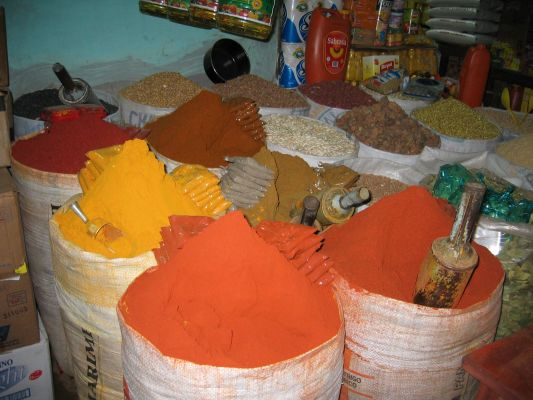
Bulk chili powder for sale in Bolivia

Chili powder (also spelled chile, chilli, or, alternatively, powdered chili) is the dried, pulverized fruit of one or more varieties of chili pepper, sometimes with the addition of other spices (in which case it is also sometimes known as chili powder blend or chili seasoning mix). It is used as a spice (or spice blend) to add pungency (piquancy) and flavor to culinary dishes. In American English, the spelling is usually "chili"; In British English, "chilli" (with two "l"s) is used consistently.

Chili powder is used in many different cuisines, including American (particularly Tex-Mex), Chinese, Indian, Sri Lankan, Bangladeshi, Mexican, Nigerian, Portuguese, Vietnamese and Thai.

== Varieties ==
Chili powder is sometimes known by the specific type of chili pepper used. Varieties of chili peppers used to make chili powder include Aleppo, ancho, cayenne, chipotle, chile de árbol, jalapeño, New Mexico, pasilla, and piri piri chili peppers. Gochugaru is a variety used in Korean cuisine traditionally made from sun-dried Korean red chili peppers known as taeyang-cho, with spicier varieties using Cheongyang peppers. Ata gun powder is widely used in Yoruba cuisine. Kashmiri chili powder is bright red, but mild in heat and used in Indian cuisine, named after the region of Kashmir.

Chili powder varieties

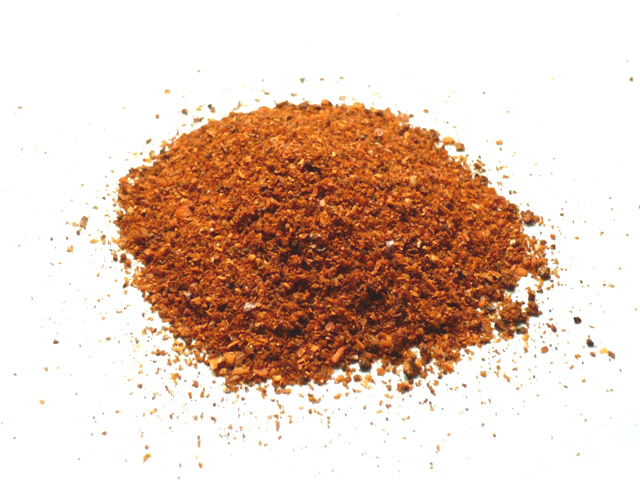
Aleppo pepper

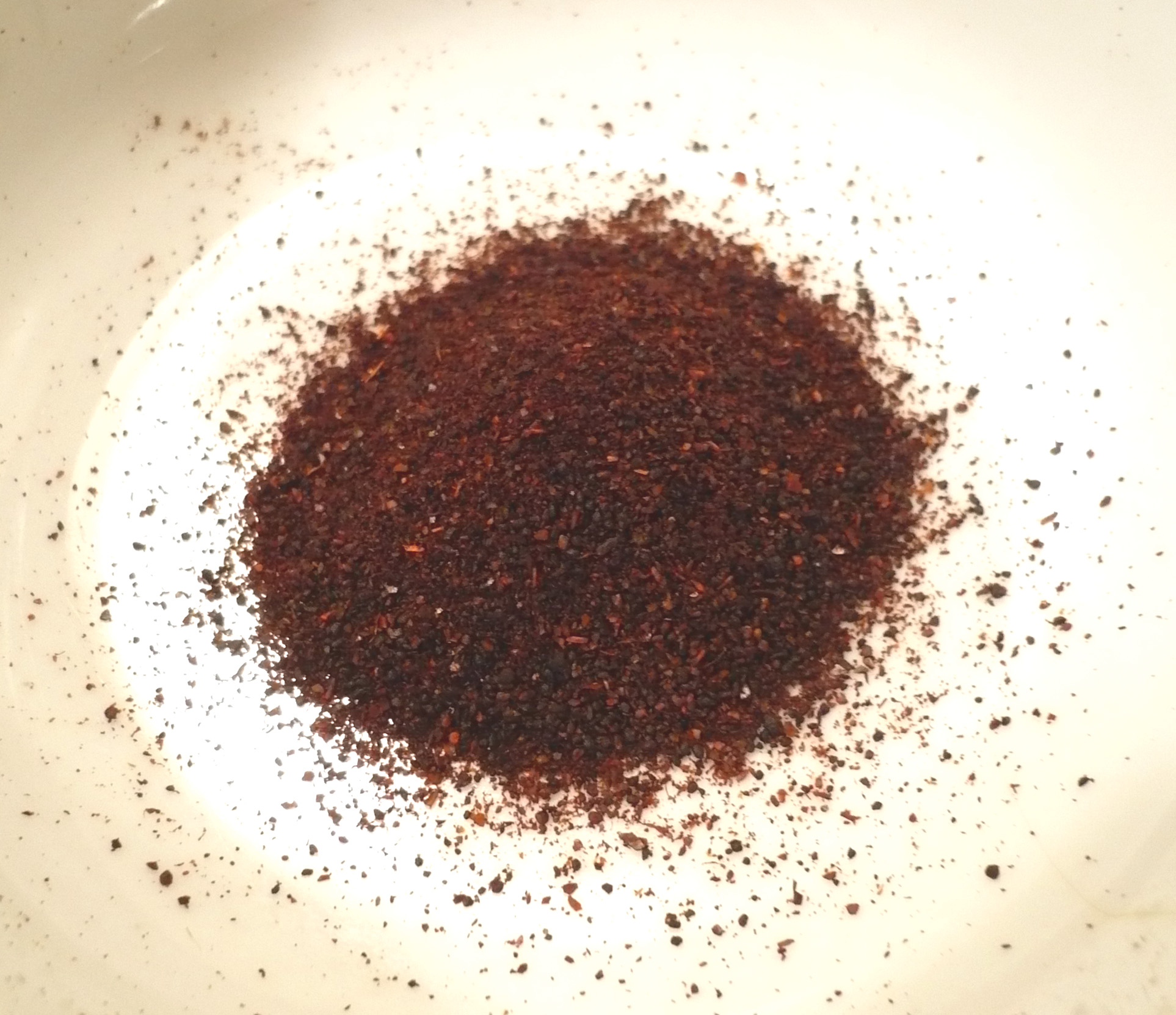
Ancho chili powder

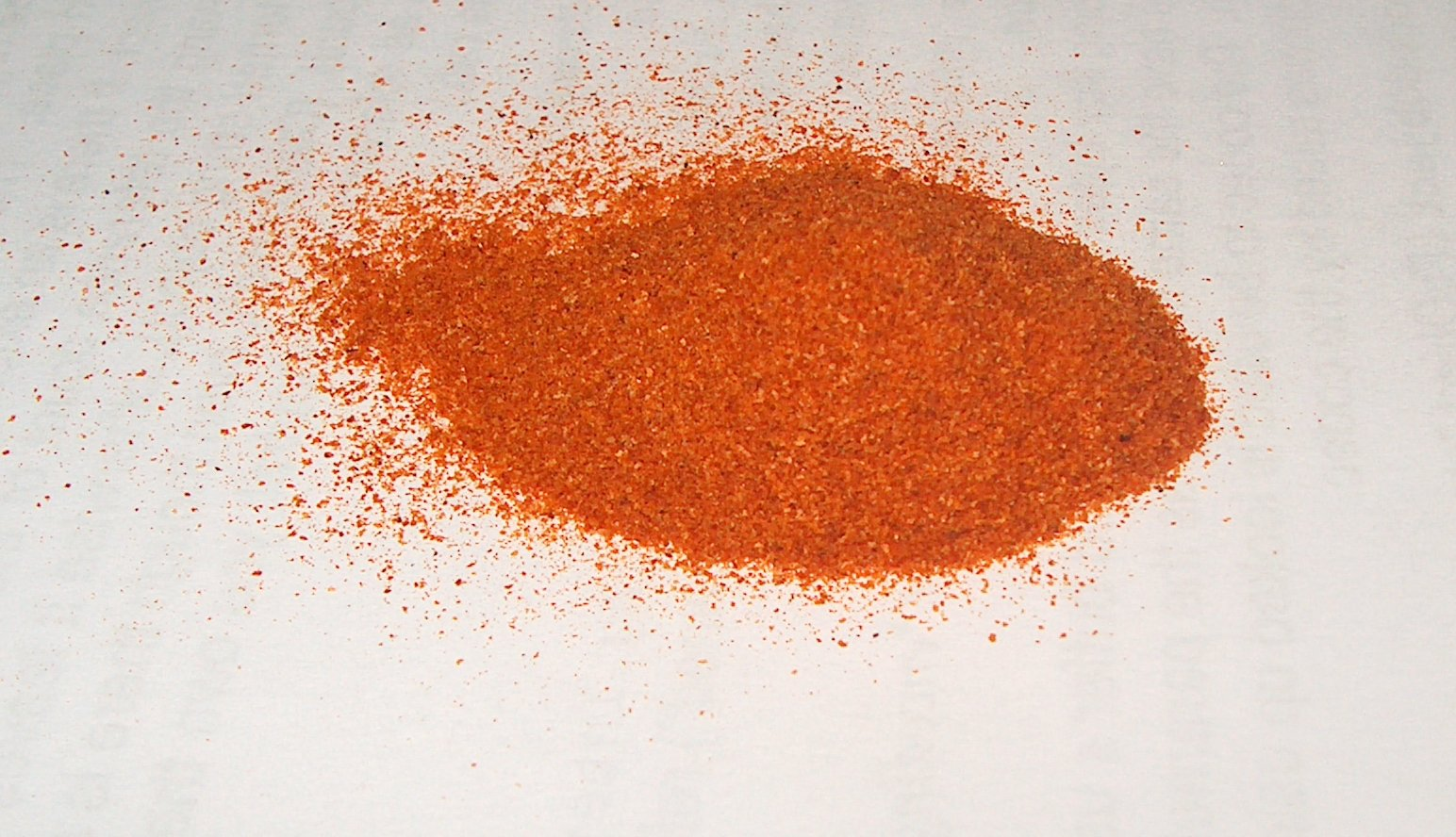
Piri piri powder

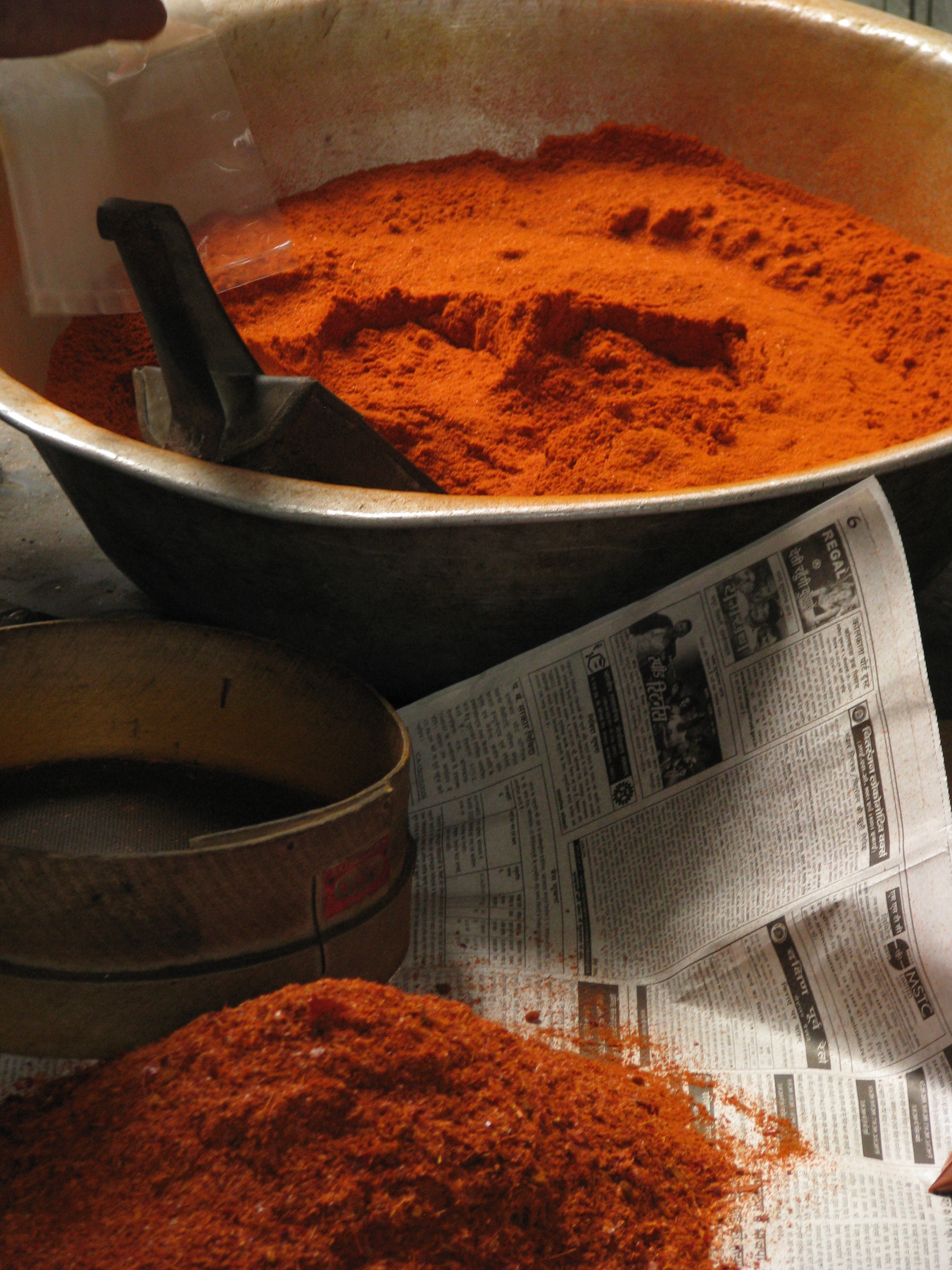
Indian chili powder (from red chilis)

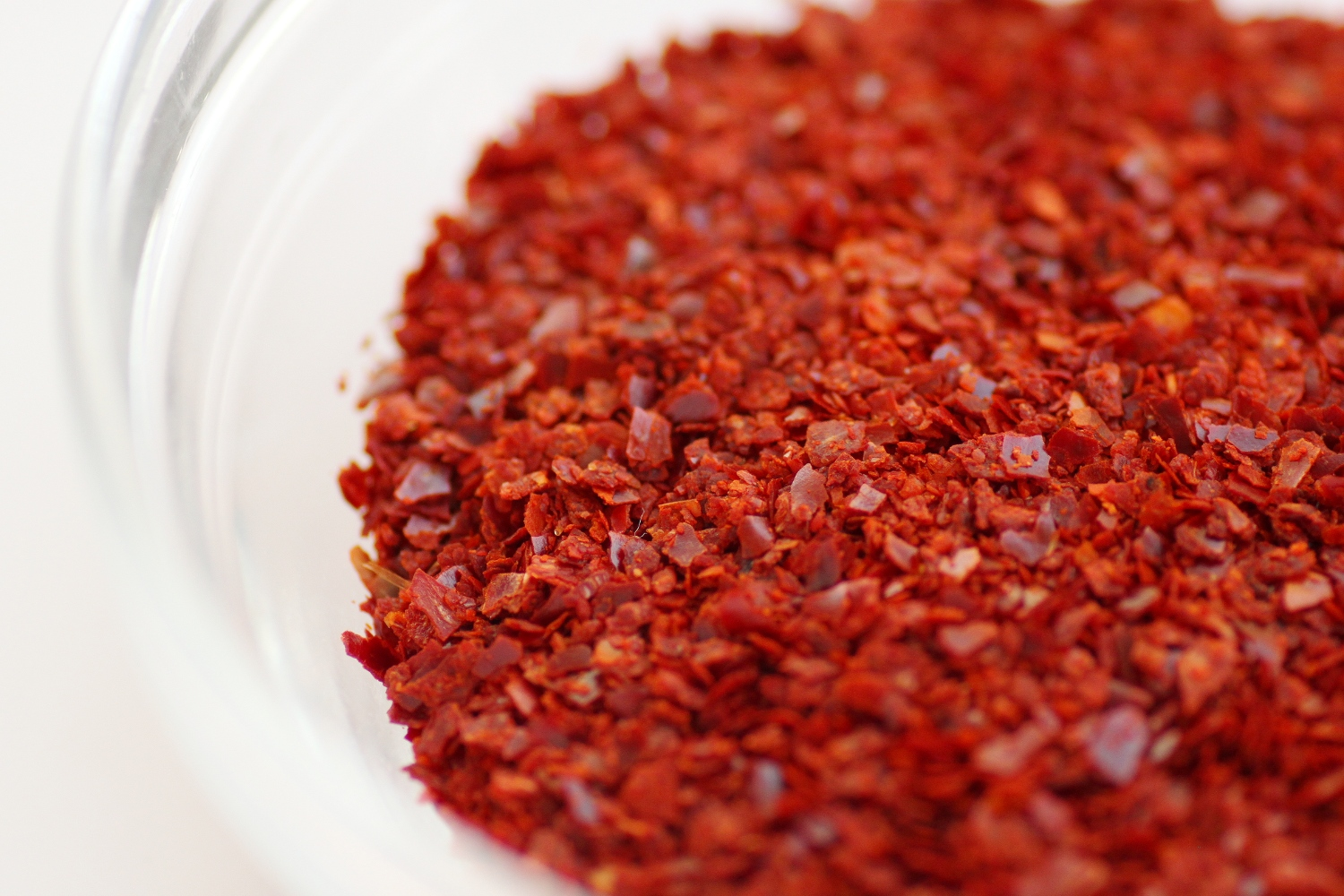
Gochugaru (Korean chili powder)

== Blends ==
Chili powder blends are composed chiefly of chili peppers and blended with other spices including cumin, onion, garlic powder, and sometimes salt. The chilies are most commonly red chili peppers; "hot" varieties usually also include cayenne pepper. As a result of the varying recipes used, the spiciness of any given chili powder is variable.

The first commercial blends of chili powder in the U.S. were created by D.C. Pendery and William Gebhardt for chili con carne. Gebhardt opened Miller's Saloon in New Braunfels, Texas. Chili was the town's favorite dish. However, chili peppers could only be found at certain times of the year. Gebhardt imported some ancho peppers from Mexico and ran the peppers through a small meat grinder three times and created the first commercial chili powder in 1894.

Chili blends are found in spice blends like Yaji.

== Chili in food ==
Chili powder is very commonly seen in traditional African, Latin American and Asian cuisine. It is used in soups, ewa agoyin, tacos, enchiladas, fajitas, curries and meat.

Chili powder blend is the primary flavor in American chili con carne.

== See also ==
- Crushed red pepper
- Food powder
- Paprika
