= Thuna paha =

Sri Lankan spice mix

- Alternative names: තුන පහ
- Type: Spice mix
- Place of origin: Sri Lanka
- Main ingredients: Cumin seeds, fennel seeds, coriander seeds
- Ingredients generally used: Curry leaves, cinnamon bark, black pepper, cloves, pandanus leaves
- Variations: Bathapu thuna paha

Thuna paha (Sinhala: තුන පහ, Tamil: மூன்று ஐந்து) is a Sri Lankan curry powder. It is a Sinhalese unroasted curry powder used to spice curry dishes, especially vegetarian dishes. The name, thuna paha, roughly translates as "three or five", as traditionally it is made from three to five ingredients.

The main ingredients are cumin seeds, fennel seeds, and coriander seeds; additional ingredients can include curry leaves, cinnamon bark, cardamon seeds, black pepper (used to give this curry powder its heat), cloves, and pandanus leaves. As with many traditional Sri Lankan dishes, there is no fixed recipe for thuna paha, with different regions and families using varying recipes containing different ratios of spices. The cardamom used is green or true cardamom (Sinhala: එනසාල් or 'enasaal'), and the cinnamon used is Ceylon cinnamon (Sinhala: කුරුඳු or 'kurundu').

== Preparation ==
The traditional method for preparing thuna paha is to allow the spices to dry in the sun and then grind them on a rectangular block of granite with a granite rolling pin, known as a miris gala (Sinhala: මිරිස් ගල). The modern approach is to slowly dry roast the spices in a hot pan to remove any moisture and release their fragrances, then use a mechanical blender to blend the spices into a powder. Traditionalists maintain that manual grinding retains the aroma, flavour and nutritional benefits of the spices whereas when pulsed in a mechanical blender, some of the aroma, flavour and nutrients are lost.

The ground powder should be sealed in an airtight container and stored in a cool dark space until ready for use. Typically, thuna paha should last in this manner for 2–4 months.

== Roasted thuna paha ==
Roasted Sinhalese curry powder, badapu or bathapu thuna paha (Sinhala: බැදපු තුන පහ), has more intense flavours than the unroasted or raw version, and is typically used in fish, meat, poultry and blackened vegetable dishes. It is also often sprinkled at the end of cooking to add a fragrant finish. The primary difference is that the spices are dry roasted until golden brown in colour before being ground into a powder.
