= Quatre épices =

Spice mix used mainly in French cuisine

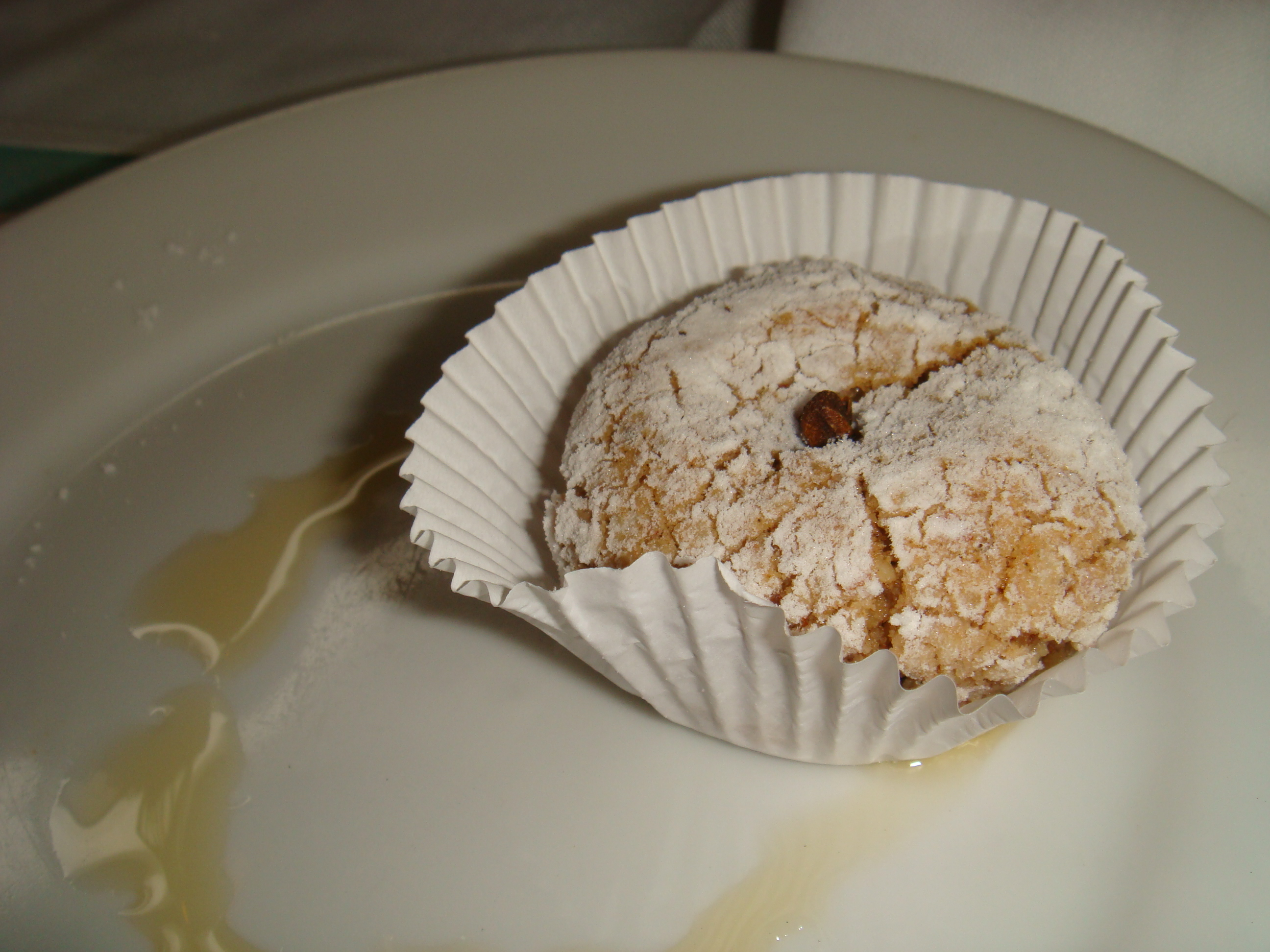
Biscuit aux quatre épices - cookie seasoned with quatre épices

Quatre épices is a spice mix used in French cuisine, and some Middle Eastern kitchens. Its name is French for "four spices"; it is considered the French allspice. The spice mix contains ground pepper (white, black, or both), cloves, nutmeg and dried ginger. Some variations of the mix use allspice or cinnamon instead of pepper, or cinnamon instead of ginger.

The blend of spices will typically use a larger proportion of pepper (usually white pepper) than the other spices, but some recipes suggest using roughly equal parts of each spice.

In French cooking, it is typically used in soup, ragout and pot-cooked dishes, vegetable preparations and charcuterie, such as pâté, sausages and terrines.
