= Yaji (spice blend) =

West African spice blend from northern Nigeria

Yaji also commonly called Suya spice is a west African spice blend in Nigeria common with the Hausa people. It is also adopted by other west Africans. It is paired as a spice rub and spice dust for suya and balangu. It is also used to eat rice, beans, grilled meat and other various food items. Yaji spice blend usually consists of dried chili peppers, ginger, onion powder, ground kuli kuli or roasted peanuts and salt, variants also include black pepper, cloves, cayenne or scotch bonnet peppers. Bouillon powder can be added as well as other additional herbs and spices. Some spices are lightly toasted before blending for more flavour. Yaji is also popularly called suya spice, due to its association as a suya rub.

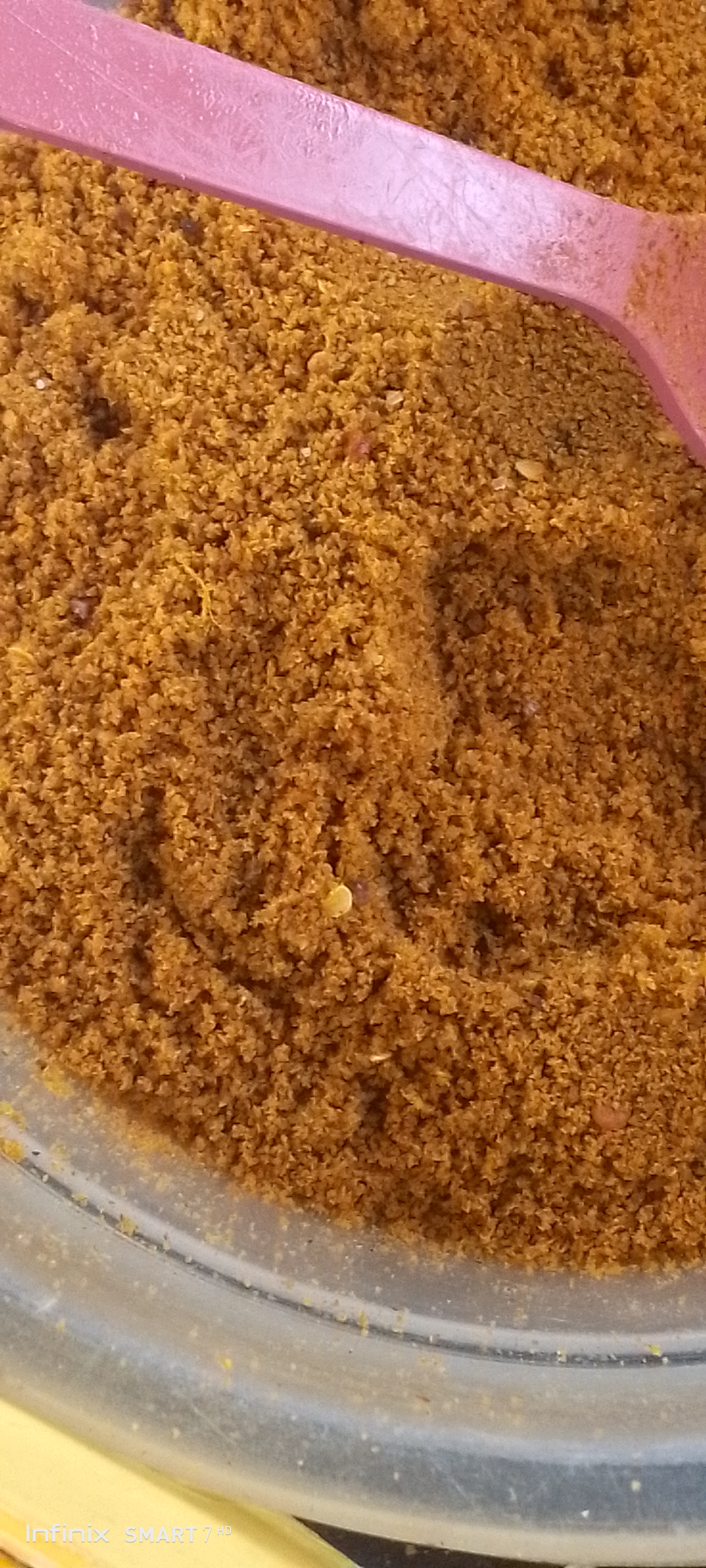
Yaji
