= Crushed red pepper =

Condiment or spice made from red chilli peppers

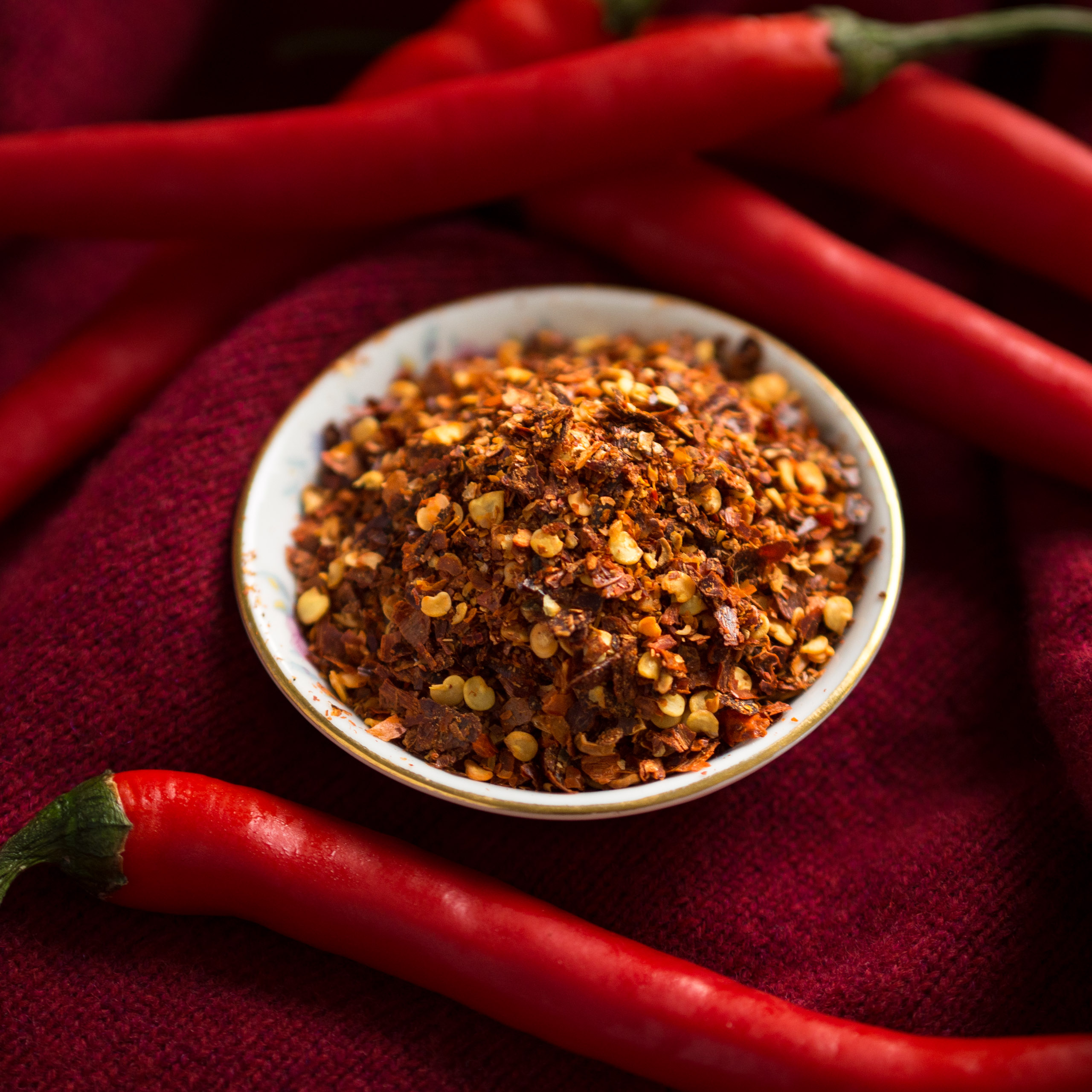
- Alternative names: Chile flakes Red pepper flakes
- Type: Spice

Crushed red pepper or red pepper flakes or chilli flakes is a condiment or spice consisting of dried and crushed (as opposed to ground) red chilli peppers. This condiment is most often produced from cayenne-type peppers, although commercial producers may use a variety of different cultivars, usually within the 30,000–50,000 Scoville unit range. Often there is a high ratio of seeds, which are often erroneously believed to contain the most heat. Crushed red pepper is used by food manufacturers in pickling blends, chowders, spaghetti sauce, pizza sauce, soups and sausage.

Crushed red chilli pepper in Turkey, served as a common condiment with very few seeds, is known as pul biber. One specially prepared variety of it is the urfa pul biber (isot).

== Background ==
Crushed red chilli pepper, known for its spicy heat, comes from a range of capsicum peppers. Red pepper chillis originally start off green before ripening into an orange-red to deep dark red color and are best grown in the summer months—between 70–84 °F (21–29 °C) and sunny weather. One or multiple red chilli peppers—up to four cultivars—can be used to create crushed red pepper. Jalapeños, serranos and Anaheim chillis are some of the most commonly used chillies to make crushed red chilli pepper. Crushed red chilli pepper is frequently found in a variety of dishes including Mexican, Chinese, Indian, Southeast Asian, Caribbean, and Italian.

Over time, like most spices, crushed red chilli loses its spiciness level and typically lasts up to 12 to 18 months. Today, China and Turkey are among the top countries to produce crushed red pepper.

== History ==
Red chilli peppers, which are a part of the Solanaceae (nightshade) family, were first found in Central and South America and have been harvested for use since about 7,500 BCE. Spanish explorers were introduced to the pepper while on a search for black pepper. Once brought back to Europe, the red chilli peppers were traded in Asian countries and were enjoyed primarily by Indian cooks. The village of Bukovo, North Macedonia, is often credited with the creation of crushed red chilli pepper. The name of the village—or a derivative of it—is now used as a name for crushed red pepper in general in many Southeast European languages: буковска пипер/буковец, bukovska piper/bukovec (Macedonian), bukovka (Serbo-Croatian and Slovene) and μπούκοβο, boukovo, búkovo (Greek).

Southern Italians popularized crushed red chilli peppers in the 19th century and heavily used them in the U.S. when they migrated there. Crushed red chilli pepper was served with dishes at some of the oldest Italian restaurants in the U.S. Crushed red pepper shakers have become a standard on tables at Mediterranean restaurants—and especially pizzerias—around the world.
