= Outline of herbs and spices =

The following outline is provided as an overview of and topical guide to herbs and spices:

== What type of things are herbs and spices? ==
Herbs – Herbs are plant-based ingredients that primarily come from the leafy green parts of plants, such as leaves, stems, and flowers. They are typically used fresh or dried, and their flavors are often milder and more aromatic than spices. Herbs are commonly added toward the end of cooking to preserve their delicate flavors and are often used in larger quantities compared to spices. They are versatile in both savory and some sweet dishes. Examples of popular herbs include basil, mint, parsley, cilantro, and rosemary, all of which enhance the flavor profile of a dish with their fresh, fragrant qualities.

Spices – Spices, on the other hand, are derived from other parts of the plant, such as seeds, roots, bark, or flowers. They are typically dried and sometimes ground into powders, and they tend to have stronger, more intense flavors compared to herbs. Spices are often used in smaller quantities due to their potency and are known for adding heat, depth, or warmth to a dish. They are used throughout cooking to build flavors and are especially important in creating complex spice blends. Common examples of spices include cinnamon (from bark), ginger (from root), cumin (from seeds), and cloves (from flower buds), all of which bring bold, distinctive tastes to a variety of cuisines.

== Types of herbs and spices ==
=== Types of herbs ===
- Angelica – Angelica archangelica, commonly known as garden angelica, holy ghost, wild celery, and Norwegian angelica, is a biennial plant from the family Apiaceae, a subspecies of which is cultivated for its sweetly scented edible stems and roots.
- Basil – or Sweet Basil, is a common name for the culinary herb Ocimum basilicum, of the family Lamiaceae, sometimes known as Saint Joseph's Wort in some English-speaking countries.
- Basil, holy – Ocimum tenuiflorum, Holy Basil, is an aromatic plant in the family Lamiaceae which is native throughout the Old World tropics and widespread as a cultivated plant and an escaped weed. It is an erect, much branched sub-shrub, 30–60 cm tall with hairy stems and simple, opposite, green leaves that are strongly scented.
- Basil, Thai – Thai basil, or Asian basil is a type of sweet basil native to Southeast Asia that has been cultivated to provide distinctive traits.
- Bay leaf – refers to the aromatic leaf of the bay laurel.
- Boldo – Peumus boldus, the only species in the genus Peumus, is commonly known as Boldo.
- Bolivian Coriander – Bolivian coriander is a herbaceous annual plant whose leaves can be used for seasoning food.
- Borage – also known as starflower, is an annual herb originating in Syria, but naturalized throughout the Mediterranean region, as well as Asia Minor, Europe, North Africa, and South America.
- Chervil – sometimes called garden chervil, is a delicate annual herb related to parsley.
- Chives – Allium schoenoprasum – the smallest species of the edible onions. A perennial plant, they are native to Europe, Asia and North America.
- Cicely – or sweet cicely is a plant of the family Apiaceae, native to Central Europe; it is the sole species in the genus Myrrhis.
- Coriander leaf (cilantro) – also known as cilantro or dhania, is an annual herb in the family Apiaceae.
- Cress – rather fast-growing, edible herb that is genetically related to watercress and mustard, sharing their peppery, tangy flavor and aroma.
- Curry leaf – tropical to sub-tropical tree in the family Rutaceae, which is native to India.
- Dill – depending on where it is grown, is either a perennial or annual herb.
- Elsholtzia ciliata – Elsholtzia ciliata, commonly known as Vietnamese balm, is a weed native to Asia, sometimes grown as an ornamental plant.
- Epazote – also known as wormseed, Jesuit's tea, Mexican tea, Paico or Herba Sancti Mariæ, it is a herb native to Central America, South America, and southern Mexico.
- Eryngium foetidum (long coriander) – Eryngium foetidum is a tropical perennial and annual herb in the family Apiaceae.
- Hemp – term reserved mainly for low tetrahydrocannabinol strains of the plant Cannabis sativa.
- Hoja santa – an aromatic herb with a heart-shaped, velvety leaf which grows in tropic Mesoamerica.
- Houttuynia cordata – Houttuynia is a genus of two species in the Saururaceae native to Southeast Asia.
- Hyssop – Hyssopus officinalis is a shrub in the Lamiaceae or mint family native to Southern Europe, the Middle East, and the region surrounding the Caspian Sea, and is sometimes used in the spice blend za'atar. (For the biblical plant usually translated as hyssop, see Ezov.)
- Jimbu – Allium hypsistum is one of two species of Allium which comprise the herb jimbu, used in cooking in parts of Nepal.
- Lavender – Lavandula angustifolia is a flowering plant in the family Lamiaceae, native to the western Mediterranean region, primarily in the Pyrenees and other mountains in northern Spain.
- Lemon balm – not to be confused with bee balm, is a perennial herb in the mint family Lamiaceae, native to southern Europe and the Mediterranean region.
- Lemon grass – Cymbopogon is a genus of about 55 species of grasses, native to warm temperate and tropical regions of the Old World and Oceania.
- Lemon myrtle – Backhousia citriodora is a flowering plant in the family Myrtaceae, genus Backhousia. It is endemic to subtropical rainforests of central and south-eastern Queensland, Australia, with a natural distribution from Mackay to Brisbane.
- Lemon verbena – Aloysia citrodora is a species of flowering plant in the verbena family, Verbenaceae, that is native to Argentina, Paraguay, Brazil, Uruguay, Chile, Bolivia, and Peru.
- Limnophila aromatica (rice paddy herb) – Limnophila aromatica is a tropical flowering plant in the plantain family, Plantaginaceae.
- Lovage – tall perennial plant, the sole species in the genus Levisticum, in the family Apiaceae, subfamily Apioideae, tribe Apieae.
- Marjoram – somewhat cold-sensitive perennial herb or undershrub with sweet pine and citrus flavors.
- Mint – Mentha is a genus of flowering plants in the family Lamiaceae. The species are not clearly distinct and estimates of the number of species varies from 13 to 18. Hybridization between some of the species occurs naturally.
- Mugwort – Artemisia vulgaris is one of several species in the genus Artemisia which have common names that include the word mugwort.
- Mitsuba – Cryptotaenia is a genus of two species of herbaceous perennial plants, native to North America and eastern Asia, growing wild in moist, shady places.
- Oregano – Origanum vulgare is a common species of Origanum, a genus of the mint family .
- Parsley – species of Petroselinum in the family Apiaceae, native to the central Mediterranean region, naturalized elsewhere in Europe, and widely cultivated as a herb, a spice and a vegetable.
- Perilla – Perilla frutescens of the mint family, Lamiaceae.
- Rosemary – woody, perennial herb with fragrant, evergreen, needle-like leaves and white, pink, purple or blue flowers, native to the Mediterranean region.
- Rue – also known as Herb-of-Grace, is a species of rue grown as a herb.
- Sage – Salvia officinalis is a perennial, evergreen subshrub, with woody stems, grayish leaves, and blue to purplish flowers.
- Savory – Satureja is a genus of aromatic plants of the family Lamiaceae, related to rosemary and thyme.
- sanshō (leaf) – Zanthoxylum piperitum, the Japanese pepper, Japanese pricklyash, is a deciduous aromatic spiny shrub or small tree of the family Rutaceae
- Shiso – shiso is the now common name for the Japanese culinary herb, seed, or entire annual plant of Perilla frutescens.
- Sorrel – or common sorrel, often simply called sorrel, is a perennial herb that is cultivated as a garden herb or leaf vegetable.
- Tarragon – perennial herb in the family Asteraceae related to wormwood.
- Thyme – culinary and medicinal herb of the genus Thymus.
- Vietnamese coriander (rau răm) – Persicaria odorata, the Vietnamese coriander, is a herb whose leaves are used in Southeast Asian cooking.
- Woodruff – Galium odoratum is a perennial plant in the family Rubiaceae, native to Europe, North Africa and Western Asia.

=== Types of spices ===
- Aonori (ground seaweed) – also known as green laver, is a type of edible green seaweed, including species from the genera Monostroma and Enteromorpha of Ulvaceae.
- Ajwain (bishop's weed) – Trachyspermum ammi, commonly known as ajowan.
- Aleppo pepper – variety of Capsicum annuum used as a spice, particularly in Middle Eastern and Mediterranean cuisine.
- Alligator pepper – North African spice which corresponds to the seeds and seed pods of Aframomum danielli, Aframomum citratum or Aframomum exscapum.
- Allspice – also called Jamaica pepper, pepper, myrtle pepper, pimenta.
- Amchoor - also called aamchur or amchur, also referred to as mango powder, is a fruity spice powder made from dried unripe green mangoes and is used as a citrusy seasoning.
- Anise – also called aniseed, is a flowering plant in the family Apiaceae native to the eastern Mediterranean region and Southwest Asia.
- Aromatic ginger – Kaempferia galanga, commonly known as kencur, aromatic ginger, sand ginger, cutcherry or resurrection lily, is a monocotyledonous plant in the ginger family.
- Asafoetida – alternative spelling asafetida, is the dried latex exuded from the living underground rhizome or tap root of several species of Ferula, which is a perennial herb.
- Camphor – Cinnamomum camphora is a large evergreen tree that grows up to 20–30 metres tall.
- Caraway – also known as meridian fennel, or Persian cumin, is a biennial plant in the family Apiaceae,
- Cardamom – refers to several plants of the similar genera Elettaria and Amomum in the ginger family Zingiberaceae.
- Cardamom, black – also known as hill cardamom.
- Cassia – Cinnamomum aromaticum, called cassia or Chinese cinnamon, is an evergreen tree native to southern China, Bangladesh, Uganda, India, and Vietnam.
- Cayenne pepper – also known as the Guinea spice, cow-horn pepper, aleva, bird pepper, or, especially in its powdered form, red pepper—is a red, hot chili pepper used to flavour dishes.
- Celery seed – Apium graveolens is a plant species in the family Apiaceae commonly known as celery or celeriac, depending on whether the petioles or roots are eaten: celery refers to the former and celeriac to the latter.
- Charoli – Charoli are seeds of Buchanania lanzan used as a cooking spice primarily in India.
- Chenpi – Chenpi or chen pi is sun-dried tangerine peel used as a traditional seasoning in Chinese cooking and traditional medicine.
- Chili pepper – fruit of plants from the genus Capsicum, members of the nightshade family, Solanaceae.
- Cinnamon – spice obtained from the inner bark of several trees from the genus Cinnamomum that is used in both sweet and savoury foods.
- Clove – aromatic dried flower buds of a tree in the family Myrtaceae.
- Coriander seed – also known as cilantro or dhania, is an annual herb in the family Apiaceae.
- Cubeb – or tailed pepper, is a plant in genus Piper, cultivated for its fruit and essential oil.
- Cumin – flowering plant in the family Apiaceae, native from the east Mediterranean to India.
- Cumin, black – Bunium persicum is a plant species in the family Apiaceae.
- Dill and dill seed – depending on where it is grown, is either a perennial or annual herb.
- Fennel – plant species in the genus Foeniculum.
- Fenugreek – annual plant in the family Fabaceae.
- Fingerroot (krachai) – also known as Chinese ginger, is a medicinal and culinary herb from China and Southeast Asia.
- Galangal, greater – Alpinia galanga, a plant in the ginger family, is a herb used in cooking, especially in Indonesian cuisine and Thai cuisine.
- Galangal, lesser – Alpinia officinarum, known as lesser galangal, is a plant in the ginger family, cultivated in Southeast Asia.
- Garlic – Allium sativum, commonly known as garlic, is a species in the onion genus, Allium.
- Ginger – Ginger or ginger root is the rhizome of the plant Zingiber officinale, consumed as a delicacy, medicine, or spice.
- Golpar – Heracleum persicum, commonly known as Golpar or Persian Hogweed, is a flowering plant in the family Apiaceae, native to Iran.
- Grains of Paradise – Aframomum melegueta is a species in the ginger family, Zingiberaceae.
- Grains of Selim – seeds of a shrubby tree, Xylopia aethiopica, found in Africa.
- Horseradish – perennial plant of the family Brassicaceae, which also includes mustard, wasabi, broccoli, and cabbages.
- Juniper berry – female seed cone produced by the various species of junipers.
- Kaempferia galanga (kencur) – Kaempferia galanga, commonly known as kencur, aromatic ginger, sand ginger, cutcherry or resurrection lily, is a monocotyledonous plant in the ginger family.
- Kokum – Garcinia indica, a plant in the mangosteen family, commonly known as kokum, is a fruit-bearing tree that has culinary, pharmaceutical, and industrial uses.
- Korarima – Aframomum corrorima is a species in the ginger family, Zingiberaceae.
- Lime, black – spice used in Middle Eastern dishes.
- Liquorice – or licorice is the root of Glycyrrhiza glabra from which a somewhat sweet flavour can be extracted.
- Litsea cubeba – May Chang is an evergreen tree or shrub 5–12 meters high in the family Lauraceae.
- Mace – any of several species of trees in genus Myristica.
- Mango-ginger – Curcuma amada is a plant of the ginger family Zingiberaceae and is closely related to turmeric.
- Mahlab – or mahlepi is an aromatic spice made from the seeds of the St Lucie Cherry.
- Malabathrum (tejpat) – or Indian bay leaf also known as Malobathrum or Malabar leaf, is the name used in classical and medieval texts for the leaf of the plant Cinnamomum tamala.
- Mustard, black – Brassica nigra is an annual weedy plant cultivated for its seeds, which are commonly used as a spice.
- Mustard, brown – Brassica juncea, also known as mustard greens, Indian mustard, Chinese mustard, and leaf mustard, is a species of mustard plant.
- Mustard, white – annual plant of the family Brassicaceae.
- Nigella (kalonji) – Nigella sativa is an annual flowering plant, native to south and southwest Asia.
- Paprika – Paprika is a spice made from ground, dried fruits of Capsicum annuum, either bell pepper or chili pepper varieties or mixtures thereof.
- Pepper, Brazilian – Schinus terebinthifolius is a species of flowering plant in the cashew family, Anacardiaceae, that is native to subtropical and tropical South America.
- Pepper, Peruvian – (Schinus molle, also known as American pepper, Peruvian peppertree, escobilla, false pepper, molle del Peru, pepper tree, peppercorn tree, Californian pepper tree, pirul and Peruvian mastic.) is an evergreen tree that grows to 15 meters (50 feet).
- Pepper, long – Long pepper, sometimes called Indian long pepper, is a flowering vine in the family Piperaceae, cultivated for its fruit, which is usually dried and used as a spice and seasoning.
- Peppercorn (black, green, and white) – flowering vine in the family Piperaceae, cultivated for its fruit, which is usually dried and used as a spice and seasoning.
- Pomegranate seed (anardana) – Punica granatum, is a fruit-bearing deciduous shrub or small tree growing between five and eight meters tall.
- Poppy seed – oilseed obtained from the opium poppy.
- Radhuni – Trachyspermum roxburghianum is a flowering plant in the family Apiaceae.
- Rose – Rosa × damascena, more commonly known as the Damask rose, the Damascus rose, or sometimes as the Rose of Castile, is a rose hybrid, derived from Rosa gallica and Rosa moschata.
- Saffron – spice derived from the flower of Crocus sativus, commonly known as the saffron crocus.
- Sarsaparilla – perennial, trailing vine with prickly stems that is native to Central America.
- sanshō (berries, ground powder) – Zanthoxylum piperitum, the Japanese pepper, Japanese pricklyash, is a deciduous aromatic spiny shrub or small tree of the family Rutaceae
- Sassafras – genus of three species of deciduous trees in the family Lauraceae, native to eastern North America and eastern Asia.
- Sesame – flowering plant in the genus Sesamum.
- shiso (seeds, berries) – is the now common name for the Japanese culinary herb, seed, or entire annual plant of Perilla frutescens
- Sichuan pepper (huājiāo) – or Szechuan pepper is a common spice used in Asian cuisine.
- Star anise – Illicium verum, commonly called Star anise, star aniseed, or Chinese star anise, is a spice that closely resembles anise in flavor, obtained from the star-shaped pericarp of Illicium verum, a medium-sized native evergreen tree of northeast Vietnam and southwest China.
- Stone flower - Parmotrema perlatum is a species of lichen native to India, grows on stone substratum, hence the name. Used dried, especially in tempering of meat and also as constituent of Spice mixes.
- Sumac – any one of approximately 250 species of flowering plants in the genus Rhus and related genera, in the family Anacardiaceae.
- Tamarind – tree in the family Fabaceae indigenous to tropical Africa.
- Tasmanian pepper – Tasmannia is a genus of woody, evergreen flowering plants of the family Winteraceae.
- Tonka bean – Dipteryx odorata is a species of flowering tree in the pea family, Fabaceae, that is native to the Orinoco region of northern South America.
- Turmeric – rhizomatous herbaceous perennial plant of the ginger family, Zingiberaceae. It is native to tropical South Asia and needs temperatures between 20 °C and 30 °C and a considerable amount of annual rainfall to thrive.
- Uzazi – dried fruit of the West African deciduous shrub Zanthoxylum tessmannii syn.
- Vanilla – flavoring derived from orchids of the genus Vanilla, primarily from the Mexican species, Flat-leaved Vanilla .
- Voatsiperifery – Piper borbonense is a species of plant in the genus Piper.
- Wasabi – Wasabia japonica or Eutrema japonica, is a member of the family Brassicaceae, which includes cabbages, horseradish, and mustard. It is also called Japanese horseradish, although it is not actually from the horseradish species of plants.
- Yuzu (zest) – The yuzu; 유자 in Korean; from Chinese 柚子, yòuzi) is a citrus fruit and plant originating in East Asia.
- Zedoary – perennial herb and member of the genus Curcuma Linn., family Zingiberaceae.
- Zereshk – Berberis vulgaris is a shrub in the family Berberidaceae, native to central and southern Europe, northwest Africa and western Asia; it is also naturalised in northern Europe, including the British Isles and Scandinavia, and North America.
- Zest – Zest is a food ingredient that is prepared by scraping or cutting from the outer, colorful skin of citrus fruits such as lemon, orange, citron, and lime.

=== Types of herb and spice mixtures ===
- Adjika – hot, spicy but subtly flavoured paste often used to flavour food mainly in the Caucasian regions of Abkhazia and Samegrelo. Adjika is usually red, though green adjika can be made with unripe peppers.
- Advieh / adwiya – a spice mixture used in Persian cuisine and Mesopotamian cuisine.
- Bahārāt – a spice mixture or blend used in Arab cuisine, especially in the Mashriq area, as well as in Turkish and Iranian cuisine.
- Berbere – a spice mixture, whose ingredients usually include chili peppers, garlic, ginger, dried basil, korarima, rue, white and black pepper and fenugreek.
- Bouquet garni – a bundle of herbs usually tied together with string and mainly used to prepare soup, stock, and various stews.
- Buknu – powdered mixture of several spices popular in parts of Uttar Pradesh, India.
- Chaat masala – spice mix used in Indian and Pakistani Cuisine.
- Chaunk – sometimes spelled chhaunk, chounk, chonk, chhounk, or chhonk; also called tarka, tadka, bagar, phoron in Bengali, oggaraṇe in Kannada, vaghaar in Gujarati, Thalimpu or popu; and often translated as tempering is a garnish and/or cooking technique used in the cuisines of India, Bangladesh, and Pakistan, in which whole spices are fried briefly in oil or ghee to liberate essential oils from cells and thus enhance their flavors, before being poured, together with the oil, into a dish.
- Chili powder – a dried, pulverized fruit of one or more varieties of chili pepper, sometimes with the addition of other spices.
- Crab boil – a spice mixture that is used to flavor the water in which crabs or other shellfish are boiled.
- Curry powder – a mixture of spices of widely varying composition based on South Asian cuisine.
- Doubanjiang – a spicy, salty paste made from fermented broad beans, soybeans, salt, rice, and various spices.
- Douchi – a type of fermented and salted soybean.
- Fines herbes – combination of herbs that forms a mainstay of Mediterranean cuisine.
- Five-spice powder – mixture of five spices endemic to Chinese cuisine, but also used in other Asian cookery as well.
- Garam masala – blend of ground spices common in North Indian and other South Asian cuisines. The exact composition of the blend varies.
- Garlic salt – flavored salt used as food seasoning made of a mixture of dried ground garlic and table salt with an anti-caking agent.
- Gochujang –
- Harissa – Tunisian hot chili sauce whose main ingredients are piri piri, Serrano peppers, and other hot chili peppers with spices such as garlic paste, coriander, red chili powder, caraway, in some vegetable or olive oil.
- Hawaij – name given to a variety of Yemenite ground spice mixtures used primarily for soups and coffee.
- Herbes de Provence – mixture of dried herbs typical of Provence.
- Jerk spice – style of cooking native to Jamaica in which meat is dry-rubbed or wet marinated with a very hot spice mixture called Jamaican jerk spice.
- Khmeli suneli – a traditional Georgian spicy herbs mixture.
- Lemon pepper – seasoning made from granulated lemon zest and cracked black peppercorns.
- Masala – term used in South Asian cuisines to mostly describe a mixture of spices.
- Mitmita – a spicy powdered seasoning used in the cuisine of Ethiopia.
- Mixed spice – also called pudding spice, is a British blend of sweet spices, similar to the pumpkin pie spice used in the United States.
- Old Bay Seasoning – a blend of herbs and spices that is currently marketed in the United States by McCormick & Company and produced in Maryland.
- Panch phoron – whole spice blend used in Bangladesh and Eastern India, especially in Mithila, Bengali, Assamese and Oriya cuisine.
- Persillade – sauce or seasoning mixture of parsley chopped together with seasonings including garlic, herbs, oil, and vinegar.
- Pumpkin pie spice – mixture of spices used in cooking pumpkin pie
- Qâlat daqqa – Tunisian Five Spices, is a spice blend originating from the North African nation of Tunisia. It is made of cloves, nutmeg, cinnamon, peppercorns, and grains of paradise mixed and ground to a fine powder.
- Quatre épices – spice blend used mainly in France, but also found in Middle Eastern kitchens.
- Ras el hanout – a popular Moroccan blend of spices that is used across North Africa.
- Recado rojo – or achiote paste is a popular blend of spices from Mexico.
- Sharena sol – the better known of the savory species.
- Shichimi – a common Japanese spice mixture containing seven ingredients.
- Tabil – Tunisian spice mixture consisting of ground coriander seed, caraway seed, garlic powder, and chili powder.
- Tandoori masala – mixture of spices specifically for use with a tandoor, or clay oven, in traditional north Indian, Pakistani and Afghan cooking.
- Yuzukoshō – type of Japanese seasoning. It is a paste made from chili peppers, yuzu peel and salt.
- Za'atar – generic name for a family of related Middle Eastern herbs from the genera Origanum, Calamintha, Thymus, and Satureja. The name za'atar alone most properly applies to Origanum syriacum.

== History of herbs and spices ==
- Spice trade
- Spice use in Antiquity

== See also ==
- Marination – process of soaking foods in a seasoned, often acidic, liquid before cooking.
- Spice rub – any mixture of ground spices that is made for the purpose of being rubbed on raw food before the food is cooked.

Lists of herbs and spices

- Australian herbs and spices – Australian herbs and spices were used by Aborigines to flavour food in ground ovens.
- Chinese herbology – theory of traditional Chinese herbal therapy, which accounts for the majority of treatments in traditional Chinese medicine .
- Culinary herbs and spices – This list is not for plants used primarily as herbal teas or tisanes, nor for plant products that are purely medicinal, such as valerian.
- Indian spices – include a variety of spices that are grown across the Indian subcontinent.
- Pakistani spices – partial list of spices commonly used in Pakistani cuisine.
- Herbal tea – herbal or plant infusion and usually not made from the leaves of the tea bush

== See also ==
- Outline of cuisine
- List of Indian spices
- List of culinary herbs and spices
- List of Pakistani spices
- List of Bangladeshi spices
- List of Australian herbs and spices
