= List of Pakistani spices =

Pakistani spices (Urdu: پاکستانی مصالحے) The following is a partial list of spices commonly used in Pakistani cuisine:

Ingredient	Urdu Name	Roman Urdu Name	Remarks
Flax seeds	السی	Aalsi	
Star anise	بادیان	Baadyan	
Ginger	ادرک	Adrak	Grated or paste
Mango powder	آمچور	Amchoor	Dried unripe mango slices or powder
Pakistani pickles	اچار	Achar	Different types of pickles
Parsley	جعفری	Jafari	
Carom seed	اجوائن	Ajwain	
Emblica Gooseberry	آملہ	Aamla	
Pomegranate seed	انار دانہ	Anaar dana	
Black cardamom	بڑی الائچی	Bari Elaichi	
Green cardamom	چھوٹی الائچی	Choti Elaichi	
Cardamom	الائچی	Elaichi	
Chutney	چٹنی	Chutney	
Cinnamon	دارچینی	Darchini	
Green coriander	ہرا دھنیا	Hara Dhania	
Coriander seed	ثابت دھنیا	Sabut Dhania	
Coriander powder	پسا دھنیا	Pissa Dhania	
Garam masala	گرم مصالحہ	Garam Masala	
Rosewater	عرق گلاب	Araq-e-Gulab	
Jaggery	گڑ	Gur	
Turmeric	ہلدی	Haldi	
Garden cress seeds	ہالوں	Haloon	
Green chili	ہری مرچ	Hari Mirch	
White pepper	سفید مرچ	Sufaid Mirch	
Chili pepper	شملا مرچ	Shimla Mirch	
Asafoetida	ہینگ	Heeng	
Tamarind	املی	Imli	
Nutmeg	جائفل	Jaifal	
Mace	جاوتری	Javitri	
Cashewnut	كاجو	Kaju	
Black salt	كالا نمک	Kala Namak	
Black pepper	كالی مرچ	Kali Mirch	
Nigella seed	کلونجی	Kalonji	
Dried fenugreek leaf	قصوری میتھی	Kasoori Methi	
Tragacanth Gum	گوند کتیرا	Gond Katira	
Allspice	کباب چینی		Similar to kabab cheeni
Piper cubeba	کباب چینی	Kebab Cheeni	
Saffron	زعفران	Zaafraan	پاکستان کا قومی مصالحہ
Saffron pulp	زعفران	Zaafraan Guda	
Dates	کھجور	Khajoor	
Poppy seed	خشخاش	Khush Khaash	
Kokum	کوکم	Kokum	
Garlic	لہسن	Lahsun	
Cloves	لونگ	Laung	
Lime	ہرا لیموں	Hara Leemoo	
Sweet lime	ہرا میٹھی لیموں	Hara Meethaa Leemoo	
Fenugreek	میتھی	Methi	
Fenugreek seeds	میتھی دانہ	Methi dane	
Salt	نمک	Namak	
Lemon	لیموں	Nimbu or leemu or neebu	
Onion peelings	پیاز کے چھلکے	Pyaz ke chilke	
Yellow pepper	پیلی مرچ	Pilli Mirchi	
Mint	پودینا	Pudina	
Onion	پیاز	Pyaz	
Mustard seed	رائی	Rai Black	
Cracked mustard seeds	کوریا	Rai Kuria	
Alkanet root	رتن جوت	Ratin jot	
Basil seeds	تخم بالنگا	Tukham balanga	
White pepper	سفید مرچ	Safed Mirchi	
Mustard greens	سرسوں بیج	Sarson	
Mustard oil	سرسوں کا تیل	Sarson ka Tel	
Fennel seed	سونف	Saunf/Sanchal Star Anis بادیان Baadyan	
Black cumin	سیاہ زیرہ	Sya Zeera	
Lima seed	شیٹو	Shettu	
Vinegar	سرکہ	Sirka	
Dill	سویا	Soya	
Dried ginger powder	سونٹھ	Sonth	
Red chili	سرخ مرچ	Surkh Mirch	
Aniseed	سونف	Chakar phool	
Citric acid	ٹاٹری	Tartri	
Bay leaf	تیز پات	Tez Paat	
Curry leaf	کڑی پتہ	Kari Patta or Karia Path	
Sesame seed	تل	Til	
Holy Basil	تلسی	Tulsi	
Vanilla	وینیلا		
Sugar	چینی	Cheeni	
Saffron	زعفران	Zaafraan	
Olive oil	زیتون کا تیل	Zaytoon ka Tel	
Tea	چائے کی پتی	Chaye ki Patti	
Cumin seed	زیرہ	Zeera	
Plum	آلو بخارا	Aloo Bukhara	

Other herbs with their Urdu names:

24K Gold leaf	سونے کا ورق	Sone Ka Warq	
Acacia tree bark	چھال کیکر	Chaal Kikar	Vachellia karroo
Acanthus seeds	تخم اٹنگن	Tukhm-e-Utangan	Blepharis edulis
Aleppo oak	مازو سبز	Mazu Sabz	Quercus infectoria
Alkanet root	رتن جوت	Ratan Jot	Alkanna tinctoria
Almond straw	کھلی بادام	Badam Ki Khali	Prunus dulcis
Alum	پھٹکری سفید	Phitkari Safaid, Fitkari Safaid	
Areca nut	چکنی سپاری	Chikni Supari, Chaliya	Areca catechu
Arjuna Bark	ارجن کی چھال	Arjun Ki Chaal	Terminalia arjuna
Arugula seeds	تخم تارا میرا	Tukhm-e-Tara Mera	Eruca sativa
Australian pine tree fruit	مائیں خوردو	Mae Khurdo	Casuarina equisetifolia
Axle wood flower	گل دھاوا	Gul-e-Dhawa	Anogeissus latifolia
Babchi	بابچی	Baabchi	Psoralea corylifolia
Babool gum	گوندببول	Gond Babool, Gond Keekar, Gond Kikar	Vachellia nilotica
Babool leaves	برگ ببول	Barg-e-Babool	Vachellia nilotica
Badhari Qand	بدھاری قند	Badari Qand	Pueraria montana
Bael fruit	بیل گری	Bel Giri	Aegle marmelos
Barberry	زرشک	Zirshak	Berberis vulgaris
Barley	جو	Joo	Hordeum vulgare
Basil seeds	تخم ما لنگا	Tukhm-e-Malanga, Tukhm-e-Rehan	Ocimum basilicum
Beeswax (desi)	موم دیسی	Moom Desi	Cera alba
Beleric	بہیڑہ	Beherra	Terminalia bellirica
Betel nut flower	گل سپاری	Gul Supari	Areca catechu
Bitter apple	شیم حنظل	Sheem Hanzal	Citrullus colocynthis
Bitter apple seeds	تخم حنزل	Tukhm-e-Hanzal	Citrullus colocynthis
Bitter ginger	نرکچور	Narakchur	Zingiber zerumbet
Bitter gourd (dried)	کریلہ خشک	Karela Khushk	Momordica charantia
Bitter gourd seeds	تخم کریلہ	Tukhm-e-Karela	Momordica charantia
Black chebulic myrobalan	چھوٹی ہڑ	Chotti Harr	Terminalia chebula
Black dammar	چندرس	Chandras	Canarium strictum
Black mica	ابرک سیاہ	Abrak Siyah	Biotite
Black musli	سیاہ موصلی	Siyah Musli	Curculigo orchioides
Black mustard seeds	رائی	Rai	Brassica nigra
Black nightshade	مکوہ خشک	Makoh Khushk	Solanum nigrum
Black-eyed Susan roots	بیخ سوسن	Beekh-e-Susan	Rudbeckia hirta
Bolus armenus	بورہ ارمنی	Borah Armani	Armenian bole
Bonduc nut	کرنجوہ	Karanjoh	Guilandina bonduc
Borage	گاؤ زبان	Gao Zaban	Borago officinalis
Borage flower	گل گاؤ زبان	Gul-e-Gaozaban	Borago officinalis
Box myrtle	کاٹھپل	Kath Phal	Myrica esculenta
Breckland thyme	اجوائن جنگلی	Ajwain Jungli	Thymus serpyllum
Broadleaf plantain	بارتنگ	Bartang	Plantago major
Brown mustard	سرسوں زرد	Sarson Zard	Brassica juncea
Brown sugar	سرخ شکر	Surkh Shakar	Sucrose
Camphor	کافور	Kafoor	Cinnamomum camphora
Carom seeds	اجوائن دیسی	Ajwain Desi	Trachyspermum ammi
Carrot seeds	تخم گاجر	Tukhm-e-Gajar	Daucus carota subsp. sativus
Cassia seeds	تخم پنواڑ	Tukhm-e-Panwar	Cassia tora
Castor bean	تخم ارنڈی	Tukhm-e-Arandi	Ricinus communis
Centella	برہمی بوٹی	Brahmi Booti	Centella asiatica
Chaksu seeds	چاکسو	Chaksu	Cassia absus
Melon Seeds	چاروں مغز	Charoon Magaz	
Chebulic myrobalan	بڑی ہڑ	Bari Har	Terminalia chebula
China root	چوب چینی	Chob Cheeni	Smilax china
Chinaberry	بکائن	Bakain	Melia azedarach
Chinese chaste tree seeds	تخم سنبھالو	Tukhm-e-Sanbhalu	Vitex negundo
Chinese rhubarb	ریوند چینی	Revand Cheeni	Rheum officinale
Colchicum	سرانجن شیریں	Suranjan-e-Shireen	Colchicum autumnale
Colchicum bitter	سرانجن تلخ	Suranjan-e-Talkh	Colchicum autumnale
Common fumitory	شاہترہ	Shahtra	Fumaria officinalis
Common mallow	خبازی	Khubazi	Malva sylvestris
Common peony	عود صلیب	Ood Saleeb	Paeonia officinalis
Common tallow laurel	میدہ لکڑی	Maida Lakdi	Litsea glutinosa
Country mallow	بیجبند سیاہ	Beejband Siyah	Sida cordifolia
Crown flower	گل مدار	Gul Madar	Calotropis gigantea
Cucumber seeds	تخم خیا رین	Tukhm-e-Khayareen	Cucumis sativus
Curry leaves	برگ کڑی	Barg-e-Kari, Barg-e-Kadi	Murraya koenigii
Cuttlefish bone	سمندر جھاگ	Samandar Jhag	Endoconcha sepiae
Dodder	افتیمون	Aftimoon	Cuscuta reflexa
Dodder seeds	تخم کثوث	Tukhm-e-Kasoos	Cuscuta reflexa
Dried aloe vera	ایلوا خشک	Ailwah Khushk	Aloe barbadensis
Dried Assyrian plum	سپتان خشک	Sapistan Khushk, Lasoora	Cordia myxa
Dried cheer pine	بہروزہ خشک	Behroza Khushk	Pinus longifolia
Dried emblic myrobalan	آنولہ خشک	Anola Khushk	Phyllanthus emblica
Dried gulancha tinospora	گلوخشک	Gilo Khushk	Tinospora cordifolia
Dried water chestnuts	سنگھاڑہ خشک	Singhara Khushk	Trapa natans
Dry lemon	لیموں خشک	Leemon Khushk	Citrus × limon
Dunal seeds	تخم حیات	Tukhm-e-Hayat	Withania coagulans
East indian globe thistle	گل مندی	Gul Mandi	Sphaeranthus indicus
Elephant creeper	سمندر سوگھ	Samandar Sogh	Argyreia nervosa
Extract of camphor	ست کافور	Sat Kafoor	Cinnamomum camphora
False black pepper	باؤ بڑنگ	Bao Barrang	Embelia ribes
False daisy	بھنگرہ	Bhangra	Eclipta prostrata
Flame of the forest tree gum	چنیا گوند	Chunia Gond, Kamar Kas	Butea monosperma
Flax seeds	السی کے بیج	Alsi ke Beej	Linum usitatissimum
Garden rue	برگ سداب	Barge Sadaab, Berge Suddaab	Ruta graveolens
Globe thistle	برم ڈنڈی	Baram Dandi	Echinops echinatus
Golden rain tree	املتاس	Amaltas	Cassia fistula
Green vitriol	کسیس سبز	Kasis Sabz	
Guggul	گوگل	Gugal	Commiphora mukul
Gulancha tinospora	ست گلو	Sat Gilo	Tinospora cordifolia
Gum of dates tree	گوند چھوارہ	Gond Chohara	Phoenix dactylifera
Gum of silk cotton tree	گوند موچرس	Gond Mocharas	Salmalia malabarica
Gum rosin	گندہ بہروزہ	Ganda Behroza	
Hedge mustard	خاکسی	Khaksi	Sisymbrium officinale
Henbane	اجوائن خراسانی	Ajwain Khurasani	Hyoscyamus niger
Henna seeds	تخم حنا	Tukhm-e-Hina	Lawsonia inermis
Hoary stock seeds	تخم تودری سفید	Tukhm-e-Todri Safaid	Matthiola incana
Hygrophila seeds	تخم تالمکھانہ	Tukhm-e-Talmakhana	Asteracantha longifolia
Hyssop	گل زوفہ	Gul Zoofa	Hyssopus officinalis
Indian mallow	بیجبند سرخ	Beejband Surkh	Abutilon indicum
Indian rennet	پنیر بوٹی	Paneer Booti	Withania coagulans
Indian tree turmeric	رسوت انڈیا	Rasoot India	Berberis aristata
Indian valerian	مشک بالا	Mushk Bala	Valeriana wallichii
Izkher roots	بیخ اذخر	Beekh-e-Azkhir	Andropogon schoenanthus
Jaggery	گڑ	Gur	
Jambolan seeds	تخم جامن	Tukhm-e-Jaman	Syzygium cumini or Eugenia jambolana
Japanese morning glory seeds	تخم نیل	Tukhm-e-Neel	Ipomoea nil
Jatamansi	بالچھڑ	Balchar	Nardostachys jatamansi
Java galanga	خولنجاں	Khulanjaan	Alpinia galanga
Jujube	عناب	Unab, Unnab	Ziziphus jujuba
Knotgrass	انجبار	Anjbar	Polygonum aviculare
Kohl	سرمہ	Surma	Antimony
Lady's finger seeds	تخم بھنڈی	Tukhm-e-Bhindi	Abelmoschus esculentus
Lebbek tree seeds	تُخم سرس	Tukhm-e-Saras	Acacia speciosa
Lettuce seeds	تخم کا ہو	Tukhm-e-Kahu	Lactuca sativa
Lichen	چھڑیلہ	Charrilah	Parmelia perlata
Liquorice	اصل السوس سایدہ	Asal Alsoos Saidah, Malethi	Glycyrrhiza glabra
Litharge	مُردار سنگ	Murdar Singh, Murdar Sang	Triplumbic tetroxide
Lodh tree	لؤد پٹھانی	Lodh Pathani	Symplocos racemosa
Long pepper root	پیپلا مول	Peeplamool	Piper longum
Madras leaf flower seeds	تخم کنو چہ	Tukhm-e-Kanucha	Phyllanthus maderaspatensis
Many spiked flacorita	زرنب	Zarnab	Flacourtia jangomas
Marine costus	قسط شیریں	Qust-e-Shireen	
Marsh mallow	خطمی	Khatmi, Khitmi	Althaea officinalis
Marsh orchid	سعلب پنجہ	Salab Panja	Dactylorhiza hatagirea
Melon seeds	تخم خربوزہ	Tukhm-e-Kharbooza	Cucumis melo
Menthol	ست پودینہ	Sat Podina	Mentha arvensis
Mexican poppy seeds	تخم ستیناسی	Tukhm-e-Satenasee	Argemone mexicana
Mexican sarsaparilla	عشبہ مغربی	Ushba Magrabi	Smilax medica
Mint	پودینہ	Podena	Mentha piperita
Miracle fruit	گڑمار بوٹی	Gurrmaar Booti	Gymnema sylvestre
Monarch redstem	کرنڈ	Krand	Ammannia baccifera
Moringa gum	گوندسوںجنا	Gond Sonjana	Moringa oleifera
Musli	سفید موصلی	Safaid Musli	Chlorophytum borivilianum
Mustard straw	کھلی سرسوں	Sarson Ki Khali	Brassica spp.
Natural borax	سہاگہ بریاں	Suhaga Baryan	Sodium tetraborate decahydrate
Neem seeds	تخم نیم	Tukhm-e-Neem	Azadirachta indica
Neem straw	کھلی نیم	Neem Ki Khali	Azadirachta indica
Ochre	گیرو	Gero	
Onion seeds	تخم پیاز	Tukhm-e-Piyaz	Allium cepa
Pala indigo	اندرجوشیریں	Indarjo Shireen	Wrightia tinctoria
Parsnip	ثقاقل مصری	Siqaqal Misri	Pastinaca sativa
Pearl ash	جواکھار	Jawakhar	Potassium carbonate
Pellitory roots	عقرقرحا	Aqar Qarha	Anacyclus pyrethrum
Phyllanthus	ہزار دانہ	Hazar Dana	Phyllanthus niruri
Pistacia	کاکڑاسنگی	Kakra Singi	Pistacia integerrima
Plumed cockscomb	سروالی	Sarwali	Celosia argentea
Pomegranate bud	کلی انار	Kali Anar	Punica granatum
Pomegranate flower	گلنار	Gulnar	Punica granatum
Pomegranate peel	پوست انار	Post Anar	Punica granatum
Poppy seeds	خشخاش	Khashkhaash	Papaver somniferum
Psyllium seed husk	اسپغول مسلم	Ispaghol Muslim	Plantago ovata
Pumpkin seeds	تخم کدو	Tukhm-e-Kaddu	Cucurbita pepo
Punarnava	تخم اسپت	Tukhm-e-Ispat	Boerhavia diffusa
Puncture vine	گھوکھرو خورد	Ghokhru Khurd	Tribulus terrestris
Purslane seeds	تخم خرفہ	Tukhm-e-Khurfa	Portulaca oleracea
Radish seeds	تخم مولی	Tukhm-e-Mooli	Raphanus sativus
Ranjbeel	رنجبیل	Ranjbeel	
Red alum	پھٹکری سرخ	Phitkari Surkh, Fitkari Surkh	Aluminum potassium sulfate
Red kamala	کمیلا	Kamela	Mallotus philippensis
Red sage	بہمن سرخ	Behman Surkh	Salvia haematodes
Rhubarb	عصارہ ریوند	Asarah Rewand	Rheum emodi
Rhubarb roots	ریوند خطائی	Revand Khatai	Rheum rhabarbarum
Roots of marsh mallow	ریشہ خطمی	Resha Khatmi	Althaea officinalis
Rose flower	گل سرخ	Gul-e-Surkh, Gulab Ka Phool	Rosa spp.
Rue	سداب	Sadab	Ruta graveolens
Sacred lotus	کنول گٹہ	Kanwal Gutta	Nelumbo nucifera
Saffron	زعفران - کیسر	Zafran	Crocus sativus
Sago	ساگودانہ	Sago Dana	Cycas revoluta
Sal ammoniac	ٹھکری نوشادر	Thikri Noshadar	Ammonium chloride
Sal tree	رال سفید	Ral Safaid	Shorea robusta
Salep orchid	سعلب مصری	Salab Misri	Orchis mascula or Dactylorhiza majalis
Salep orchid root	سعلب گٹہ	Salab Gatta	Orchis mascula
Sandal wood	صندل سفید	Sandal Safed	Santalum album
Sandalwood peel	صندل سفید چھلکہ	Sandal Safaid Chilka	Santalum album
Satawar	ستا ور		Asparagus racemosus
Screw tree	مڑوڑ پھلی	Marrorr Phali	Helicteres isora
Sesame	تل	Til	Sesamum indicum
Sesame seeds, black	تل سیاہ	Til Siyah	Sesamum indicum
Shame plant	لجونتی باریک	Lajwanti Bareek	Mimosa pudica
Silk cotton tree	موصلی سینبھل	Musli Senbhal	Bombax malabaricum
Smearwort	زراوندمدحرج	Zaravand Mudharij	Aristolochia rotunda
Snake root	اسرول	Asrol	Rauwolfia serpentina
Soap nut	ریٹھے	Reethe	Sapindus trifoliatus
Soap pod wattle	سکا کایی	Seekakai	Acacia concinna
Soapstone	سنگجراحت مسلم	Sangjarahat Muslim	Hydrated magnesium silicate
Spearmint	پودینہ کوہی	Podina Kohi, Pahari Podina	Mentha sylvestris
Spleenwort	چترک	Chitrak	Asplenium spp.
Stinging nettle	بچھوپھل	Bicho Phal	Urtica dioica
Sumac	سماق	Sumaq	Rhus coriaria
Sunflower seeds	تخم سورج مکھی	Tukhm-e-Suraj Mukhi	Helianthus annuus
Sweet cyperus	ناگر موتھ	Nagar Moth	Cyperus rotundus
Sweet flag	گڑبچ	Gurbach	Acorus calamus
Sweet thorn	پھلی ببول	Phalli Babool	Acacia karoo
Sweet violet	گل بنفشہ	Gul-e-Banafsha	Viola odorata
Tamarind seeds	تخم تمرہندی خورد	Tukhm-e-Tamar Hindi Khord	Tamarindus indica
Tellicherry bark	اندرجوتلخ	Indarjo Talkh	Holarrhena antidysenterica
Thymol	ست اجوائن	Sat Ajwain	Trachyspermum ammi
Toothache fruit	کباب خنداں	Kabab Khandan	Zanthoxylum alatum
Tragacanth gum	گوند کتیرا	Gond Katira	Astragalus gummifer
Tree turmeric	رسوت	Rasoot	Berberis lycium
Turnip seeds	تخم شلجم	Tukhm-e-Shaljam	Brassica rapa
Vasaka	برگ اڑوسہ	Barg-e-Aroosa	Adhatoda vasica
Velvet bean	کونج سفید	Konj Safaid	Mucuna pruriens
Vetiver	خس	Khus	Chrysopogon zizanioides
Wall flower seeds	تخم تودری سرخ	Tukhm-e-Todri Surkh	Cheiranthus cheiri
Walnut tree bark	دنداصہ	Dandasa	Juglans regia
Water lily flower	گُل نیلوفر	Gul-e-Neelofer, Kanwal Ka Phool	Nymphaea alba
White beeswax	دیسی موم سفید	Desi Moom Safaid	Cera alba
White lupin	ترمس	Tarmas	Lupinus albus
White mica	ابرک سفید	Abrak Safeed	Muscovite
Wild egg plant	بھٹ کٹیا	Bhat Katiya	Solanum surattense
Wild indigo	سرپھوکہ	Sarphoka, Saraponkh	Baptisia australis
Wild mint	پودینہ خشک	Podina Khushk	Mentha arvensis
Wild turmeric	آنبہ ہلدی	Amba Haldi	Curcuma aromatica
Winter cherry	اسگند	Asgandh	Withania somnifera
Yarrow seeds	تخم گند نا	Tukhm-e-Gandana	Achillea millefolium
Yellow sulfur	آملہ سار گندھک	Amla Saar Gandhak	Sulfur
Zedoary	کپور کیجری	Kapor Kejri	Curcuma zedoaria
