= Powder-douce =

Spice mix used in Medieval and Renaissance cookery

Powder-douce (also poudre-douce, literally "sweet powder") is a spice mix used in Medieval and Renaissance cookery. Like modern spice mixes, such as Italian seasoning or garam masala, there was not a set ingredient list, and it varied from cook to cook. The author of the 14th-century manuscript Le Ménagier de Paris suggested a mix of grains of paradise, ginger, cinnamon, nutmeg, sugar, and galangal.

The 16th-century Catalan cookbook Llibre del Coch gives two recipes for polvora de duch: The first is made with ginger, cinnamon, cloves and sugar, all finely chopped and sifted with a cedaç (a fine sieve made of horsehair), while the second adds galangal and long pepper.

There is a related mixed spice called powder-forte, literally "strong powder".

== See also ==
- Pumpkin pie spice
