= Daqqa =

Daqqa (Arabic: دقة) is a surname found in the State of Palestine. Notable people with this name include:

- Walid Daqqa (1961–2024), Palestinian prisoner
- Samer Abu Daqqa (c. 1978 – 2023), Belgian-Palestinian journalist

== See also ==
- Qâlat daqqa, Tunisian spice blend
