= Pumpkin Spice Spam =

Limited edition variety of Spam

- Type: Precooked canned meat product
- Course: Main course or ingredient
- Place of origin: US
- Created by: Hormel Foods Corporation
- Invented: 2019
- Serving temperature: Hot or cold
- Main ingredients: Pork with Ham, Sugar, Water, Salt, Spices
- Food energy (per 2 ounces (57 g) serving): 180 kcal (750 kJ)
Nutritional value
(per 2 ounces (57 g) serving)
- Protein: 7 g
- Fat: 16 g
- Carbohydrate: 3 g

Pumpkin Spice Spam is a limited edition variety of Spam produced by Hormel Foods. It was released online on 23 September 2019, the first day of autumn. Spam is one of many brands to release pumpkin spice products for the autumn season, and is not the first meat product to be pumpkin spice flavored.

== History ==
In October 2017, Spam shared a picture of Pumpkin Spice Spam on their Facebook page and noted that it was not a real product they were selling. The post went viral, and many Facebook users commented with interest in the fake product. Spam's official Facebook account responded that, "We think it's great that you'd like to see this product! Unfortunately this variety is only a joke, so it cannot be found anywhere." Two years later, in August 2019, Spam announced they were producing a legitimate limited edition Pumpkin Spice product for the autumn season.

== Distribution ==
The product was only available online at Spam's website and Walmart.com in two-can packs. Some food critics were sent cans of the product before the release date. In less than seven hours on the day of release, the Spam had sold out. Pumpkin Spice Spam has not been sold since 2019.

== Ingredients ==
The Spam is mixed with allspice, cinnamon, clove, and nutmeg to gain its Pumpkin Spice flavor. Spam representatives stated that they recommend pairing it with other dishes, such as waffles, cornbread, panini, frittatas, or vegetable hash. Similar to many other pumpkin spice products, there is no pumpkin in the food.

== Reception ==
Multiple people and groups, mostly food critics, received the product prior to its public release. Most reviewers stated that the product is better when combined with other items as well as that it is more suited as a breakfast food than traditional Spam. The Daily Meal called it "one of the more peculiar pumpkin spice products on the market" and that "the flavor really wasn't bad". Food & Wine was also sent a can, noting that "Pumpkin Spice Spam certainly seems to err on the side of a breakfast food, and could easily be slathered in maple syrup as you might with breakfast sausage." A contributor to the New York Post, who did not receive the product, referred to it as Spam's "own demented take on everybody's favorite orange gourd."
