= C16H19NO3 =

The molecular formula C_{16}H_{19}NO_{3} (molar mass: 273.33 g/mol) may refer to:

- Piperlonguminine
- Phescaline
