= Pumpkin pie spice =

Spice mix used to flavor pumpkin pie

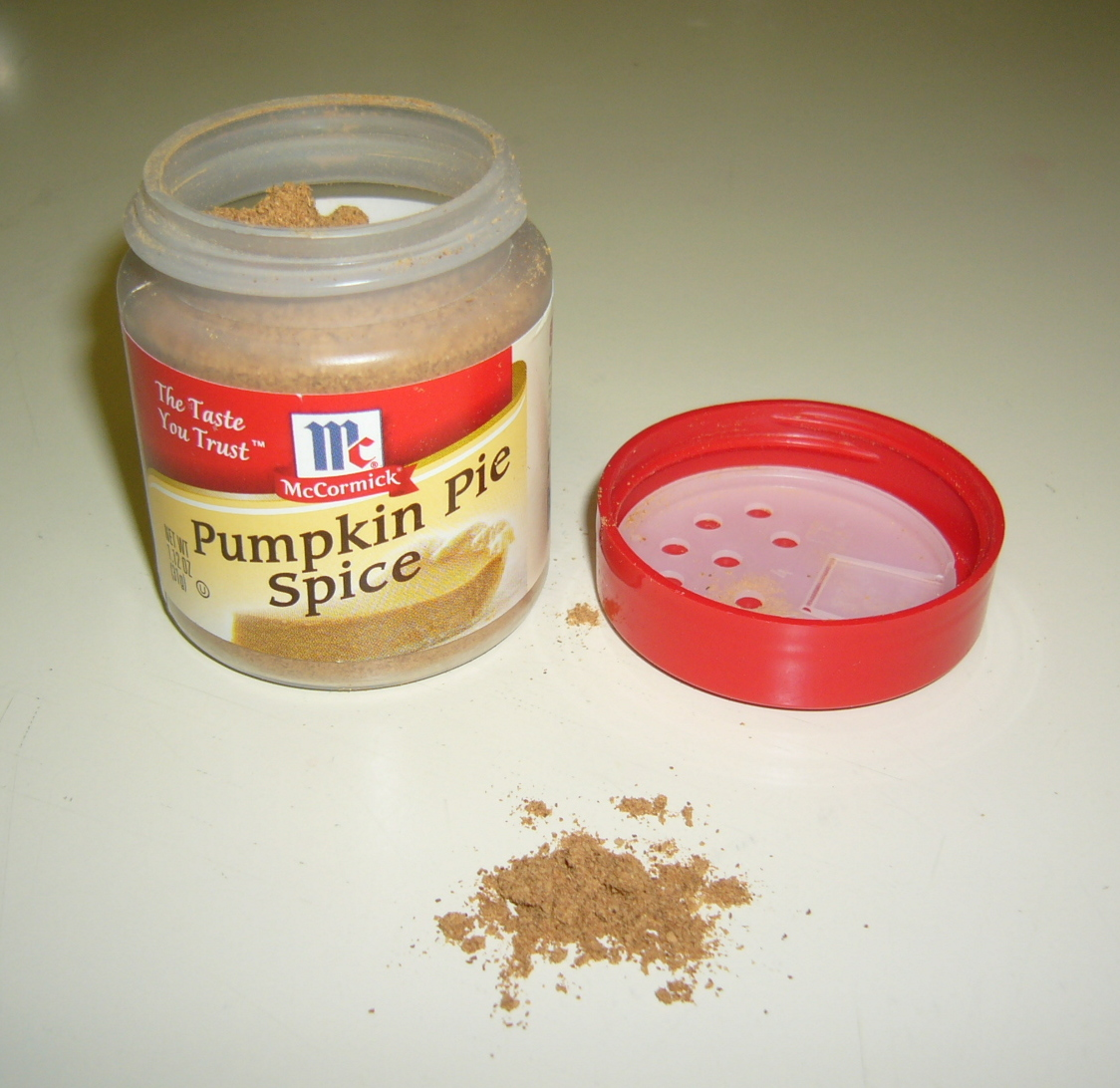
A container of pumpkin pie spice

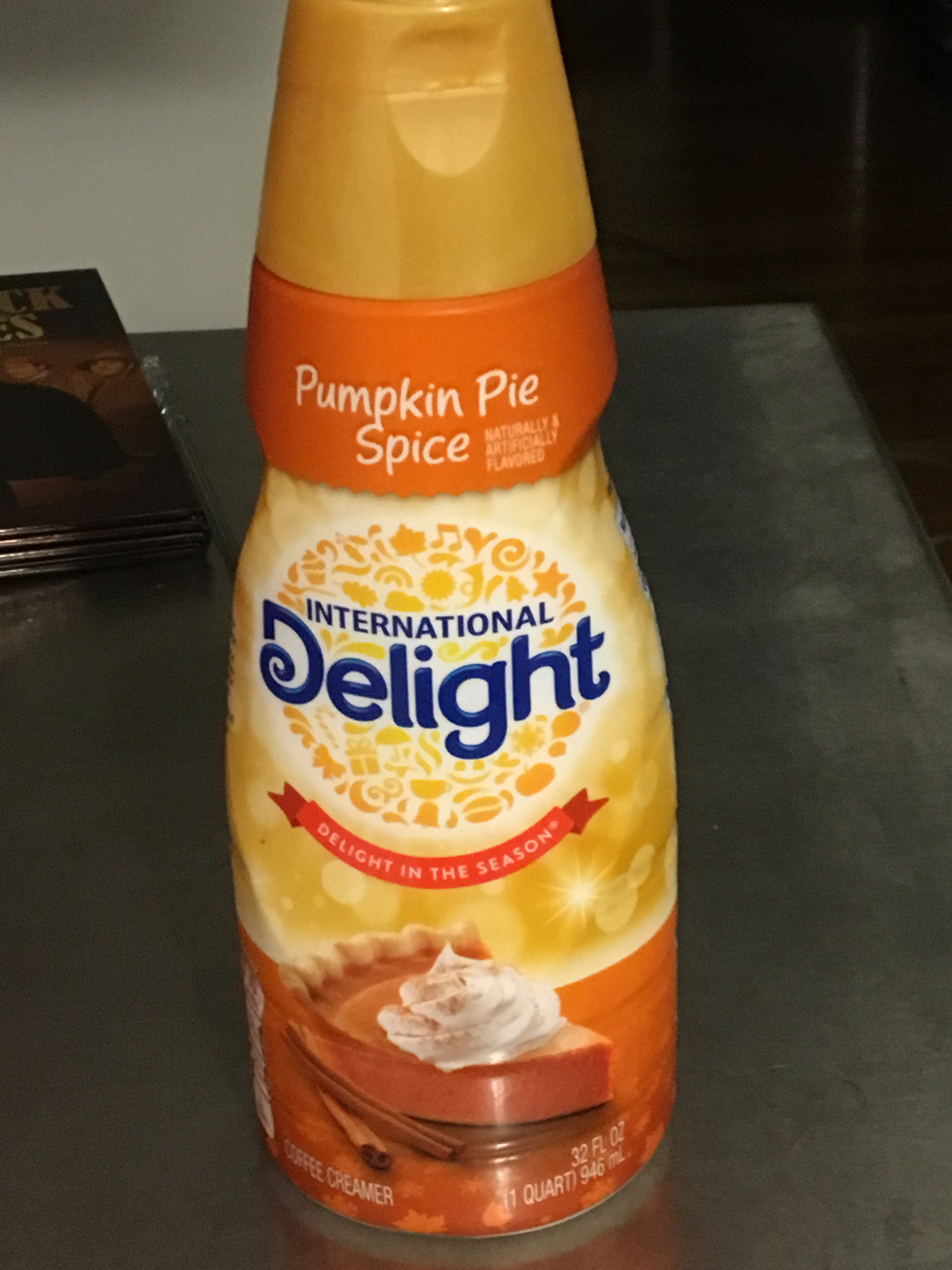
Liquid pumpkin pie spice as a general-use coffee syrup

Pumpkin pie spice, also known as pumpkin spice, is an American spice mix developed for flavoring the filling of a pumpkin pie. It does not include pumpkin as an ingredient.

Pumpkin pie spice is similar to the British and Commonwealth mixed spice, and the medieval poudre-douce. It is generally a blend of ground cinnamon, nutmeg, ginger, cloves, and sometimes allspice. It can also be used as a seasoning in general cooking.

Coffee chain Starbucks began selling its pumpkin spice latte nationally in Fall 2004, touching off a seasonal fad of spiced products. As of 2016, pumpkin spice consumables produce $500 million in annual sales.

== History ==
Flavour combinations similar to pumpkin spice were known in the medieval period—the 1390s book Le Ménagier de Paris contains a spice mix of 17 parts ginger, 4 parts each cinnamon and sugar, and 2 parts each cloves and grains of paradise. Similar spice mixes were often called poudre-douce or sweet powder.

A "Pompkin" recipe calling for a similar spice mix (mace, nutmeg, and ginger) can be found in the first known published American cookbook, American Cookery, published in 1796 by Amelia Simmons:

Pompkin

No. 1. One quart stewed and strained, 3 pints cream, 9 beaten eggs, sugar, mace, nutmeg and ginger, laid into paste No. 7 or 3, and with a dough spur, cross and chequer it, and baked in dishes three quarters of an hour.

No. 2. One quart of milk, 1 pint pompkin, 4 eggs, molasses, allspice and ginger in a crust, bake 1 hour.

Pumpkin pie spice has been mentioned in cookbooks dating to the 1890s. Blended pumpkin pie spice was introduced commercially by McCormick & Company in 1934.

== See also ==
- Five-spice powder
- Garam masala
- Powder-douce, a similar spice blend in medieval Europe
- Pumpkin spice latte
- Pumpkin Spice Spam
- Ras el hanout
- Speculoos
