= Herb =

Plant used for food, medicine or perfume

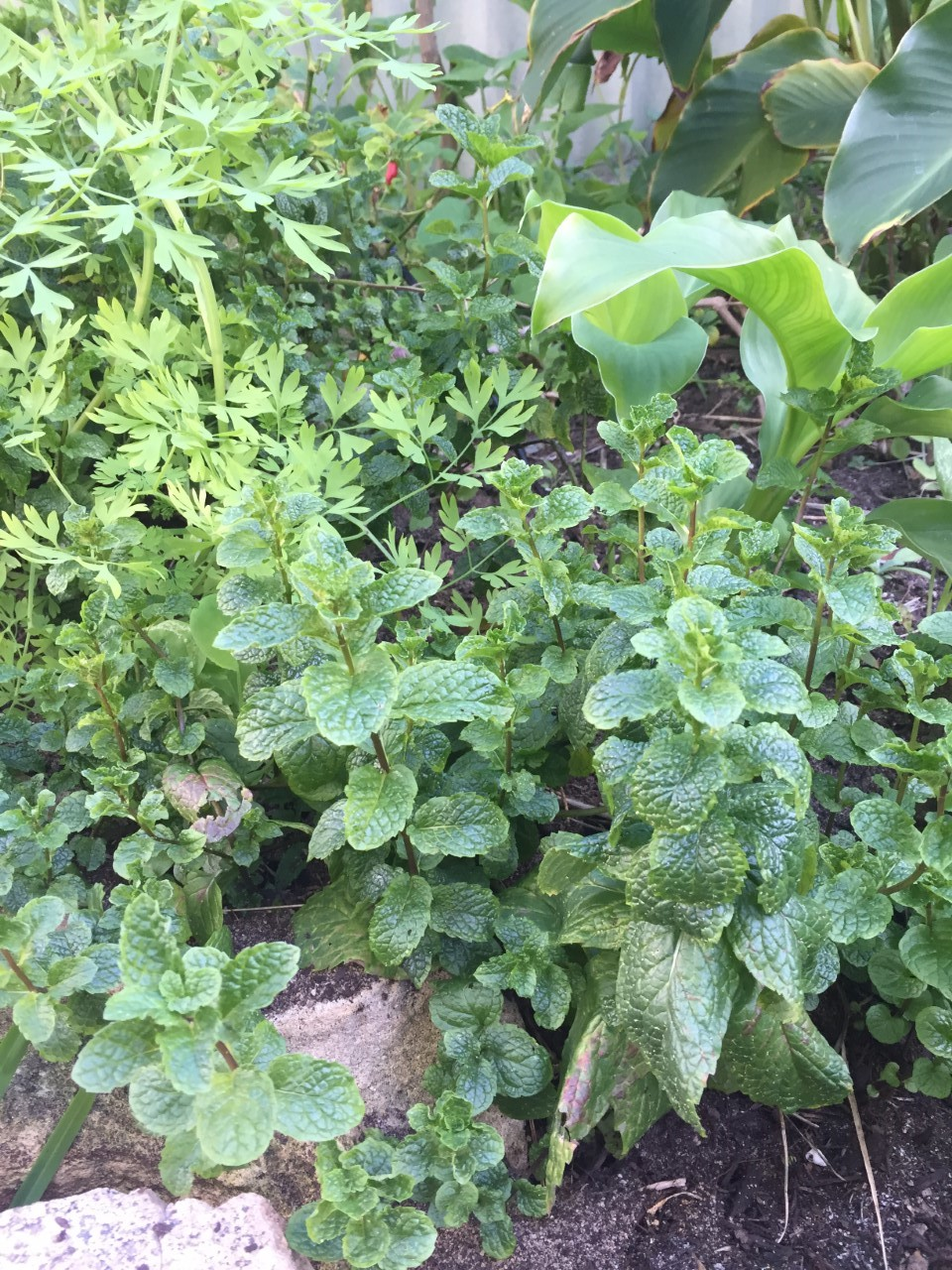
A variety of herbs are visible in this garden, including mint and parsley.

Herbs are a widely distributed and widespread group of plants, excluding vegetables, with savory or aromatic properties that are used for flavoring and garnishing food, for medicinal purposes, or for fragrances. Culinary use typically distinguishes herbs from spices. Herbs generally refers to the leafy green or flowering parts of a plant (either fresh or dried), while spices are usually dried and produced from other parts of the plant, including seeds, bark, roots and fruits.

Herbs have a variety of uses including culinary, medicinal, aromatic and in some cases, spiritual. General usage of the term "herb" differs between culinary herbs and medicinal herbs; in medicinal or spiritual use, any parts of the plant might be considered "herbs", including leaves, roots, flowers, seeds, root bark, inner bark (and cambium), resin and pericarp.

The word "herb" is pronounced /hɜːrb/ in Commonwealth English, but /ɜːrb/ is standard among American English speakers as well as those from regions where h-dropping occurs. In Canadian English, both pronunciations are common. In botany, the noun "herb" refers to a "plant that does not produce a woody stem", and the adjective "herbaceous" means "herb-like", referring to parts of the plant that are "green and soft in texture".

"What is a herb?" "The friend of physicians and the praise of cooks."

— Alcuin and his student Charlemagne

== Definition ==
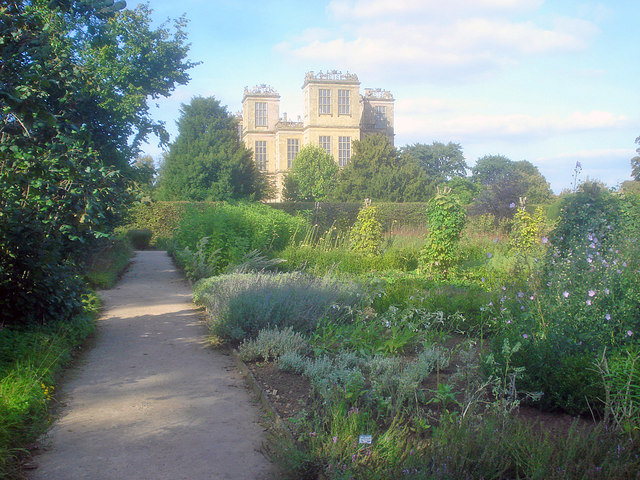
Herb garden at Hardwick Hall, Derbyshire, England, originally planted in the 1870s by Lady Louisa Egerton, recreated by the National Trust, largely following the original design.

In botany, the term herb refers to a herbaceous plant, defined as a small, seed-bearing plant without a woody stem in which all aerial parts (i.e. above ground) die back to the ground at the end of each growing season. Usually the term refers to perennials, although herbaceous plants can also be annuals (plants that die at the end of the growing season and grow back from seed next year), or biennials. This term is in contrast to shrubs and trees which possess a woody stem. Shrubs and trees are also defined in terms of size, where shrubs are less than ten meters tall, and trees may grow over ten meters. The word herbaceous is derived from Latin herbāceus meaning "grassy", from herba "grass, herb".

Another sense of the term herb can refer to a much larger range of plants, with culinary, therapeutic or other uses. For example, some of the most commonly described herbs such as sage, rosemary and lavender would be excluded from the botanical definition of an herb as they do not die down each year, and they possess woody stems. In the wider sense, herbs may be herbaceous perennials but also trees, subshrubs, shrubs, annuals, lianas, ferns, mosses, algae, lichens, and fungi. Herbalism can utilize not just stems and leaves but also fruit, roots, bark and gums. Therefore, one suggested definition of an herb is a plant which is of use to humans, although this definition is problematic since it could cover a great many plants that are not commonly described as herbs.

Production of herbs

Yield of herbs

== History ==
Ancient Greek philosopher Theophrastus divided the plant world into trees, shrubs, and herbs. The Talmud, a foundational Jewish text from antiquity, references approximately fifteen different herbs used for seasoning. Herbs came to be considered in three groups, namely pot herbs (e.g. onions), sweet herbs (e.g. thyme), and salad herbs (e.g. wild celery). During the seventeenth century, as selective breeding changed the plants' size and flavor away from the wild plant, pot herbs began to be referred to as vegetables as they were no longer considered only suitable for the pot.

Botany and the study of herbs were, in their infancy, primarily a study of the pharmacological uses of plants. During the Middle Ages, when humoral theory guided medicine, it was posited that foodstuffs, possessing their own humoral qualities, could alter the humoral temperaments of people. Parsley and sage were often used together in medieval cookery, for example in chicken broth, which had developed a reputation as a therapeutic food by the 14th century. One of the most common sauces of the age, green sauce, was made with parsley and often sage as well. In a 14th-century recipe recorded in Latin "for lords, for settling their temperament and whetting their appetite" green sauce is served with a dish of cheese and whole egg yolks boiled in watered down wine with herbs and spices.

== Reproduction ==
Perennial herbs are usually reproduced by stem cuttings, either softwood cuttings of immature growth, or hardwood cuttings where the bark has been scraped to expose the cambium layer. A cutting is usually approximately 3 to 4 inches (8 to 10 cm) in length. Plant roots can grow from the stems. Leaves are stripped from the lower portion up to one half before the cutting is placed in growth medium or rooted in a glass of water. This process requires high humidity in the environment, sufficient light, and root zone heat.

== Uses ==
=== Culinary ===
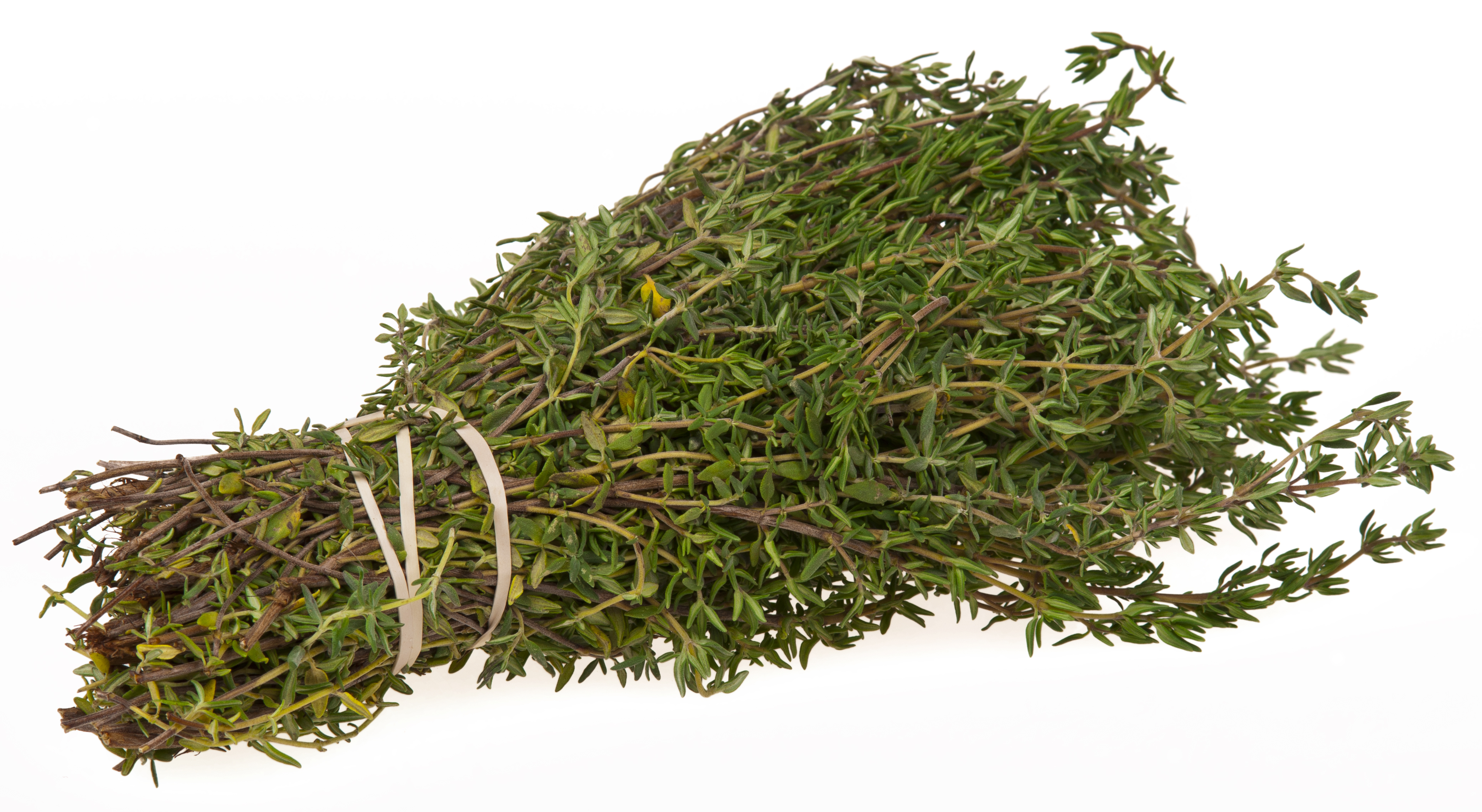
A bundle of thyme (Thymus)

Culinary herbs are distinguished from vegetables in that, like spices, they are used in small amounts and provide flavor rather than substance to food.

Herbs can be perennials such as thyme, oregano, sage or lavender, biennials such as parsley, or annuals like basil. Perennial herbs can be shrubs such as rosemary (Rosmarinus officinalis), or trees such as bay laurel (Laurus nobilis) – this contrasts with botanical herbs, which by definition cannot be woody plants. Some plants are used as both herbs and spices, such as dill weed and dill seed or coriander leaves and seeds. There are also some herbs, such as those in the mint family, that are used for both culinary and medicinal purposes.

Emperor Charlemagne (742–814) compiled a list of 74 different herbs that were to be planted in his gardens. The connection between herbs and health is important already in the European Middle Ages--The Forme of Cury (that is, "cookery") promotes extensive use of herbs, including in salads, and claims in its preface "the assent and advisement of the masters of physic and philosophy in the King's Court".

=== Teas ===
Some herbs can be infused in boiling water to make herbal teas (also termed tisanes). Typically the dried leaves, flowers or seeds are used, or fresh herbs are used. Herbal teas tend to be made from aromatic herbs, may not contain tannins or caffeine, and are not typically mixed with milk. Common examples include chamomile tea, or mint tea. Herbal teas are often used as a source of relaxation or can be associated with rituals.

=== Medicine ===
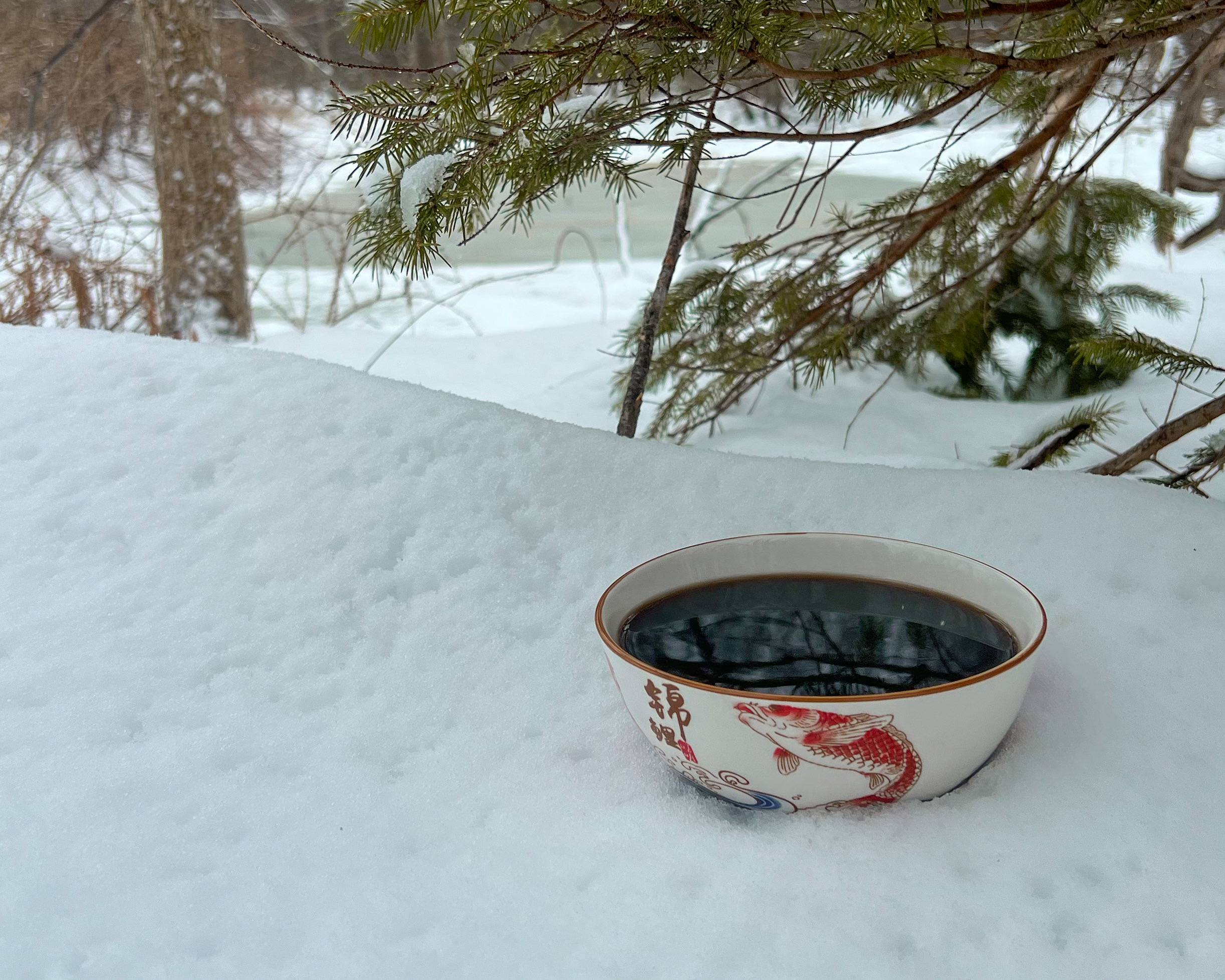
A traditional Chinese decoction (湯劑/汤剂), using Chinese herbs

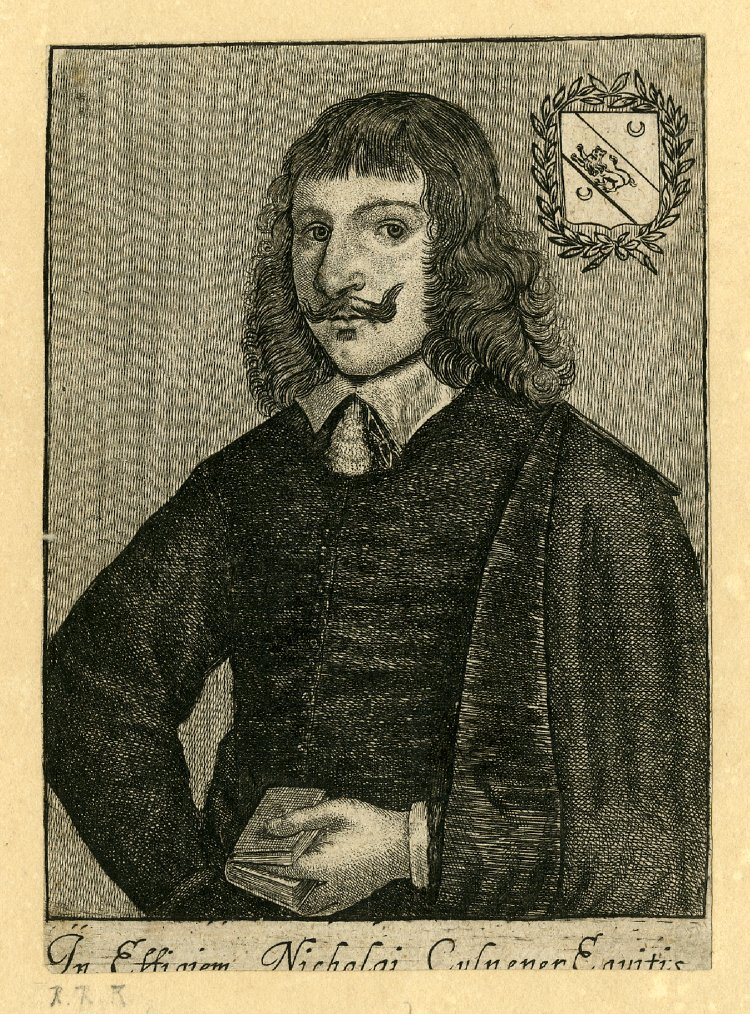
Nicholas Culpeper was an English botanist, herbalist, physician, and astrologer. (etching by Richard Gaywood between 1644 and 1662)

Herbs were used in prehistoric medicine. As far back as 5000 BCE, evidence that Sumerians used herbs in medicine was inscribed on cuneiform. In 162 CE, the physician Galen was known for concocting complicated herbal remedies that contained up to 100 ingredients.

Some plants contain phytochemicals that have effects on the body. There may be some effects when consumed in the small levels that typify culinary "spicing", and some herbs are toxic in larger quantities. For instance, some types of herbal extract, such as the extract of St. John's-wort (Hypericum perforatum) or of kava (Piper methysticum) can be used for medical purposes to relieve depression and stress. However, large amounts of these herbs may lead to toxic overload that may involve complications, some of a serious nature, and should be used with caution. Complications can also arise when taken with some prescription medicines.

Herbs have long been used as the basis of traditional Chinese herbal medicine, with usage dating as far back as the first century CE and far before. In India, the Ayurveda medicinal system is based on herbs. Medicinal use of herbs in Western cultures has its roots in the Hippocratic (Greek) elemental healing system, based on a quaternary elemental healing metaphor. Famous herbalist of the Western tradition include Avicenna (Persian), Galen (Roman), Paracelsus (German Swiss), Culpepper (English) and the botanically inclined Eclectic physicians of 19th century/early 20th century America (John Milton Scudder, Harvey Wickes Felter, John Uri Lloyd). Modern pharmaceuticals had their origins in crude herbal medicines, and to this day, some drugs are still extracted as fractionate/isolate compounds from raw herbs and then purified to meet pharmaceutical standards.

There is a record dated 1226 for '12d for Roses for Baron's Chamber and in 1516 for flowers and rushes for chambers for Henry the 9th

Certain herbs contain psychoactive properties that have been used for both religious and recreational purposes by humans since the early Holocene era, notably the leaves and extracts of the cannabis and coca plants. The leaves of the coca plant have been chewed by people in northern Peruvian societies for over 8,000 years, while the use of cannabis as a psychoactive substance dates back to the first century CE in China and northern Africa.

Indigenous Australian peoples developed "bush medicine" based on plants that were readily available to them. The isolation of these groups meant the remedies developed were for far less serious diseases than the western illnesses they contracted during colonisation. Herbs such as river mint, wattle and eucalyptus were used for coughs, diarrhea, fever and headaches.

=== Ritual ===
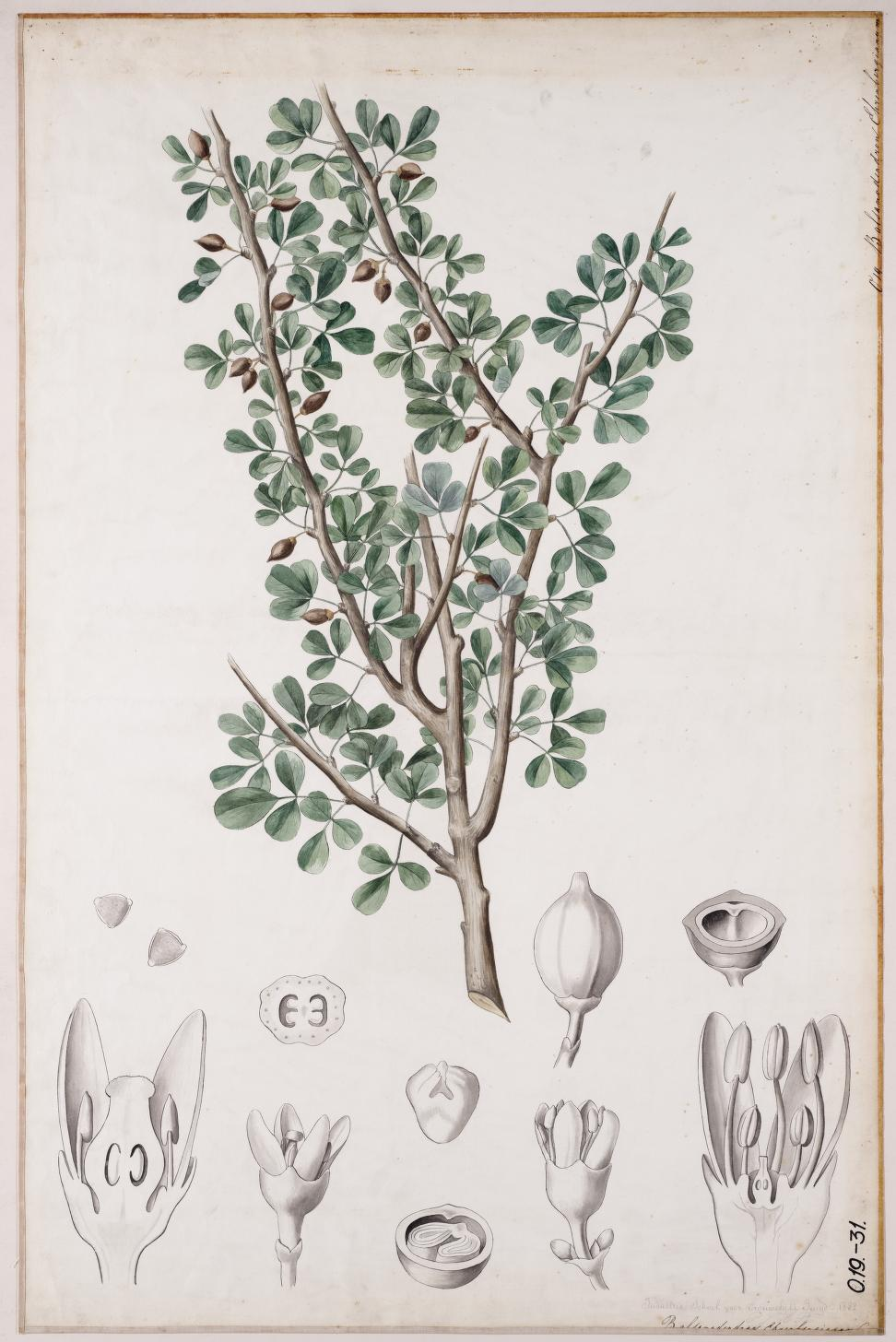
Commiphora gileadensis (Gilead myrrh)

Herbs are used in many religions. During the monastic era, monks would cultivate herbs alongside vegetables, while others would be set aside in a physic garden for specific purposes. For example, myrrh (Commiphora myrrha) and frankincense (Boswellia species) in Hellenistic religion, the nine herbs charm in Anglo-Saxon paganism, neem (Azadirachta indica) leaves, bael (Aegele marmelos) leaves, holy basil or tulsi (Ocimum tenuiflorum), turmeric or "haldi" (Curcuma longa), cannabis in Hinduism, and white sage in Wicca. Rastafari also consider cannabis to be a holy plant.

Siberian shamans also used herbs for spiritual purposes. Plants may be used to induce spiritual experiences for rites of passage, such as vision quests in some Native American cultures. The Cherokee use both white sage and cedar for spiritual cleansing and smudging.

=== Cosmetics ===
Originally, there was always doubt in ancient societies, especially in the sceptical medium of western traditions, as to the efficacy of herbal medicines. The use of herbal cosmetics dates back around six centuries ago in Europe and Western countries. Mixtures and pastes were often concocted to whiten the face. During the 1940s, herbal cosmetics took a turn with the emerging red lipstick color, with every year gaining a more intense red. Herbal cosmetics come in many forms, such as face creams, scrubs, lipstick, natural fragrances, powders, body oils, deodorants and sunscreens. They activate through the epithelium of sebaceous glands to make the skin more supple. Ayurvedic oils are widely used in India, prized for their natural health-giving properties.

One method and perhaps the best, used to extract natural oils from herbs to make lipstick is partition chromatography. The process involves separation in a watery solution, and then the injection of colour under pressure.

=== Other ===
Strewing herbs are scattered (strewn) over the floors of dwelling places and other buildings. Such plants usually have fragrant or astringent smells, and many also serve as insecticides (e.g. to repel fleas) or disinfectants. For example, meadowsweet (Filipendula ulmaria) was sometimes strewn across floors in the Middle Ages because of its sweet smell.

== See also ==
- Apothecary
- Herb chopper
- Herb farm
- Outline of herbs and spices
- Seed
- Spice
