= Pimento dram =

Jamaican liqueur produced by steeping allspice berries in rum

Pimento dram (or allspice dram, pimento cordial, or allspice liqueur) is a Jamaican liqueur produced by steeping allspice ("pimento") berries in rum.

The 2021 The Oxford Companion to Spirits and Cocktails states that pimento dram has been an article of commerce since the 1850s, and has a flavor "reminiscient of cloves, cinnamon, and nutmeg." There are several entries for pimento dram being presented at the International Exhibition of 1862 by the Royal Society of Arts, Jamaica.
