= Pumpkin spice latte =

Autumnal coffee drink

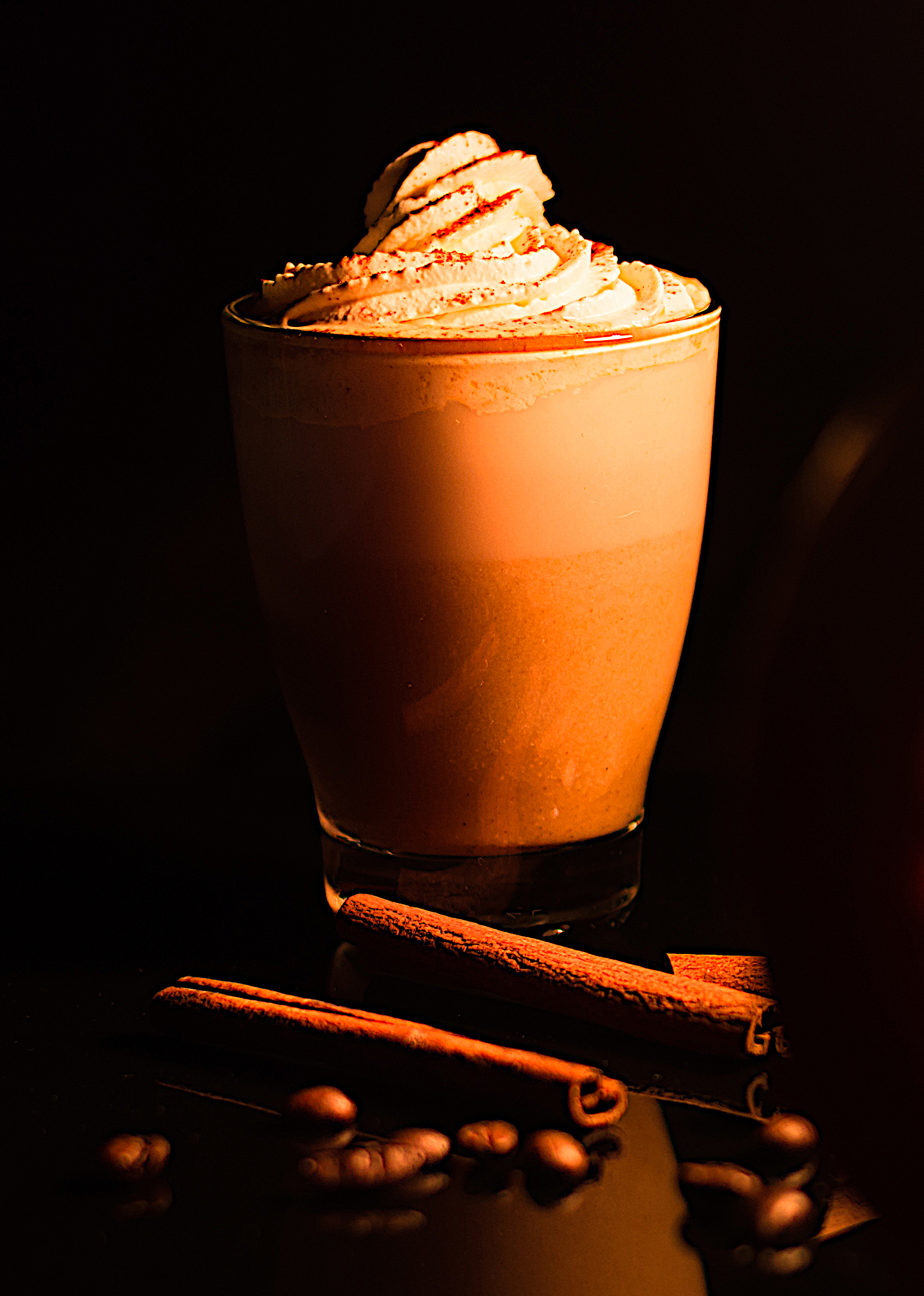
- Alternative names: PSL
- Type: Coffee drink
- Place of origin: United States
- Main ingredients: Pumpkin pie spice, milk, espresso, whipped cream, sugar, pumpkin puree
- Variations: Hot drinks, iced drinks, frappuccino, instant coffee, masala chai latte

A pumpkin spice latte (PSL) is a coffee drink made with a mix of spice flavors (cinnamon, nutmeg, and clove), steamed milk, espresso, and often sugar, topped with whipped cream and pumpkin pie spices.

Starbucks began selling pumpkin spice lattes in the fall of 2003. Initially their version contained no pumpkin; Starbucks modified the recipe in 2015 to satisfy demand. Starbucks obtained a trademark for the abbreviation PSL in 2015. The flavor has inspired a range of seasonal product variations. The pumpkin spice latte has since been offered by chains including Dunkin' Donuts and McDonald's.

== History ==
Pumpkin pie has a long history in the United States, dating to its colonial era. Starting in the 1930s, spice companies began selling readymade pumpkin pie spice blends. Who first added pumpkin spice to lattes is unknown. In the 1990s, small coffee shops in the United States sold pumpkin spice lattes. The singer-songwriter Tori Amos was quoted during a 1995 show played in Seattle, the home of the coffee chain Starbucks, that she preferred her homemade brew "that tastes like pumpkin pie. It's my own invention; it's my contribution to Halloween."

In January 2003, Starbucks began developing its pumpkin spice latte, following the success of winter beverages such as the peppermint mocha and eggnog latte. During development, Starbucks' team collaborated with food scientists to create four potential seasonal beverages: a chocolate-based drink, a caramel-flavored beverage, a cinnamon-flavored option, and a pumpkin-flavored latte. Although the pumpkin beverage initially received mixed feedback, Dukes and the team advocated for its inclusion, ultimately approving it as the fourth option.

The development lab was decorated with autumnal items such as leaves and pumpkins, and the team sampled pumpkin pie mixed with espresso to refine the recipe. In late 2003, the final recipe was tested at select Starbucks locations in Vancouver and Washington, D.C., where sales exceeded expectations. In 2004, pumpkin spice latte was rolled out to all U.S. Starbucks locations.

In 2013, Starbucks introduced a promotional gaming element, allowing customers to "unlock" the pumpkin spice latte at select stores by ordering it with a code prior to its official release. That year, Starbucks applied to trademark the initialism "PSL", with the trademark registered in 2015. In August 2015, Starbucks modified the pumpkin spice latte recipe to include actual pumpkin and remove artificial colors. The updated ingredients included a "pumpkin pie–flavored syrup" made with sugar, condensed skim milk, pumpkin purée, coloring, and preservatives. According to the Institute of Food Technologists, the change was largely imperceptible to consumers and was implemented primarily to satisfy those who wanted real pumpkin listed among the ingredients. In 2017, the pumpkin spice latte became available iced or as a Frappuccino, and later that year, Starbucks introduced a pumpkin spice chai latte variant.

== Reception ==
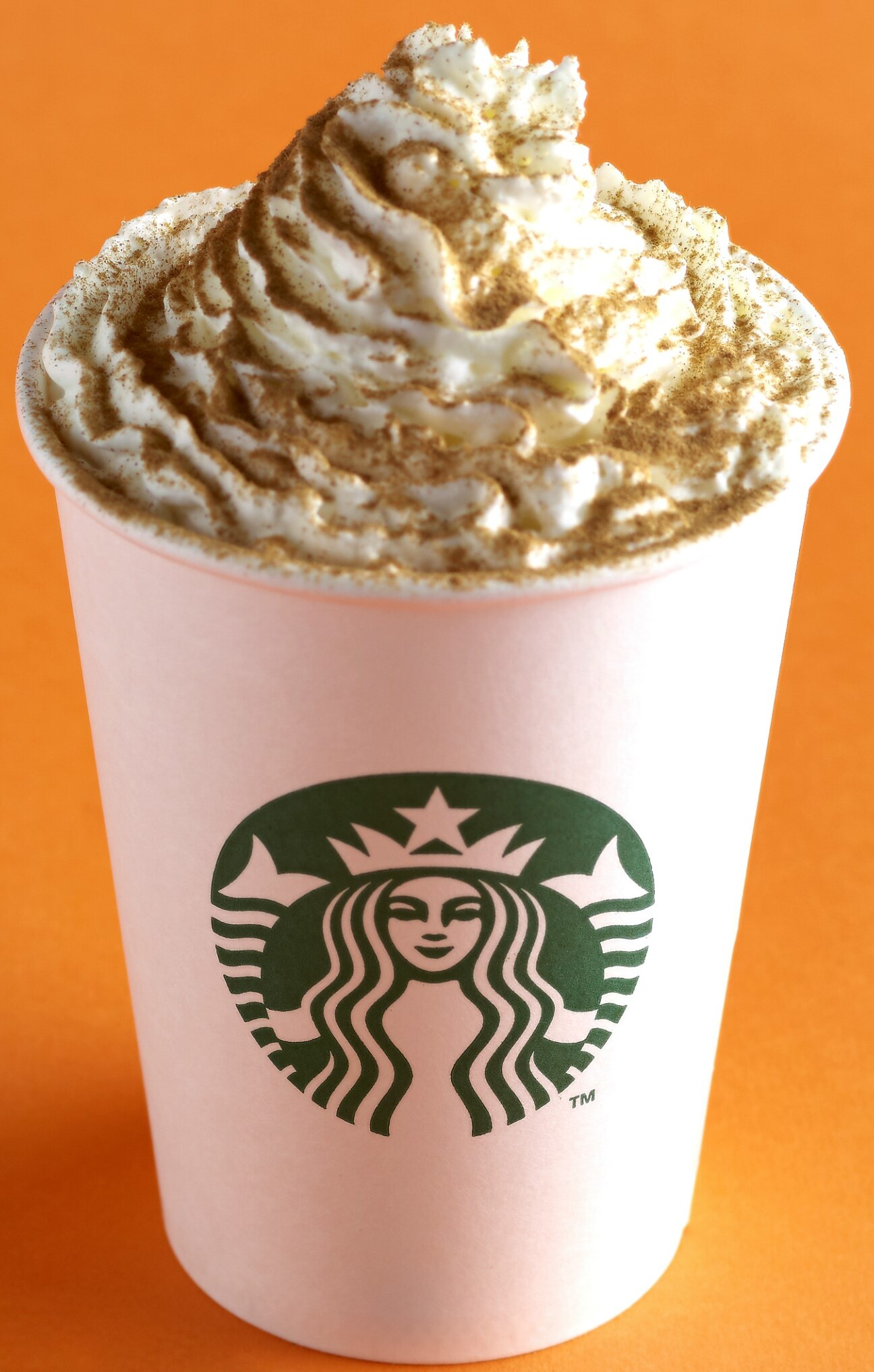
Starbucks pumpkin spice latte with whipped cream

As of 2013, Starbucks had sold over 200 million pumpkin spice lattes since the drink's launch. In some seasons, it generated at least $80 million in revenue annually, outselling other seasonal beverages. Forbes estimated that the beverage accounted for $100 million in revenue for Starbucks in 2015. CNBC reported in 2019 that the pumpkin spice latte is Starbucks most popular seasonal drink, with worldwide sales of around 424 million. By 2025, the drink generated approximately $500 million annually. In September 2025, the Starbucks CEO, Brian Niccol, said that Starbucks had already seen an increase in sales, noting that fall products, including pumpkin-flavored offerings such as the pumpkin spice latte, pumpkin cream cold brew, and iced pumpkin cream chai, helped Starbucks "deliver a record-breaking sales week" at its U.S. company-operated store.

In 2013, Donston-Miller of Forbes attributed the enduring popularity of the drink to its limited annual availability, which fuels anticipation and engagement; fans eagerly await its seasonal release, share their excitement on social media, and lament its absence until the following year. During the fall season, Starbucks' pumpkin spice latte generates substantial social media engagement, with an estimated 3,000 daily tweets using the hashtag "#PSL". Starbucks maintains an official Instagram account featuring the beverage in seasonal-themed illustrations. The pumpkin spice latte also helped popularize a wider range of pumpkin spice products, including candles, air fresheners, doughnuts, breakfast cereals, cough drops, and pasta sauce.

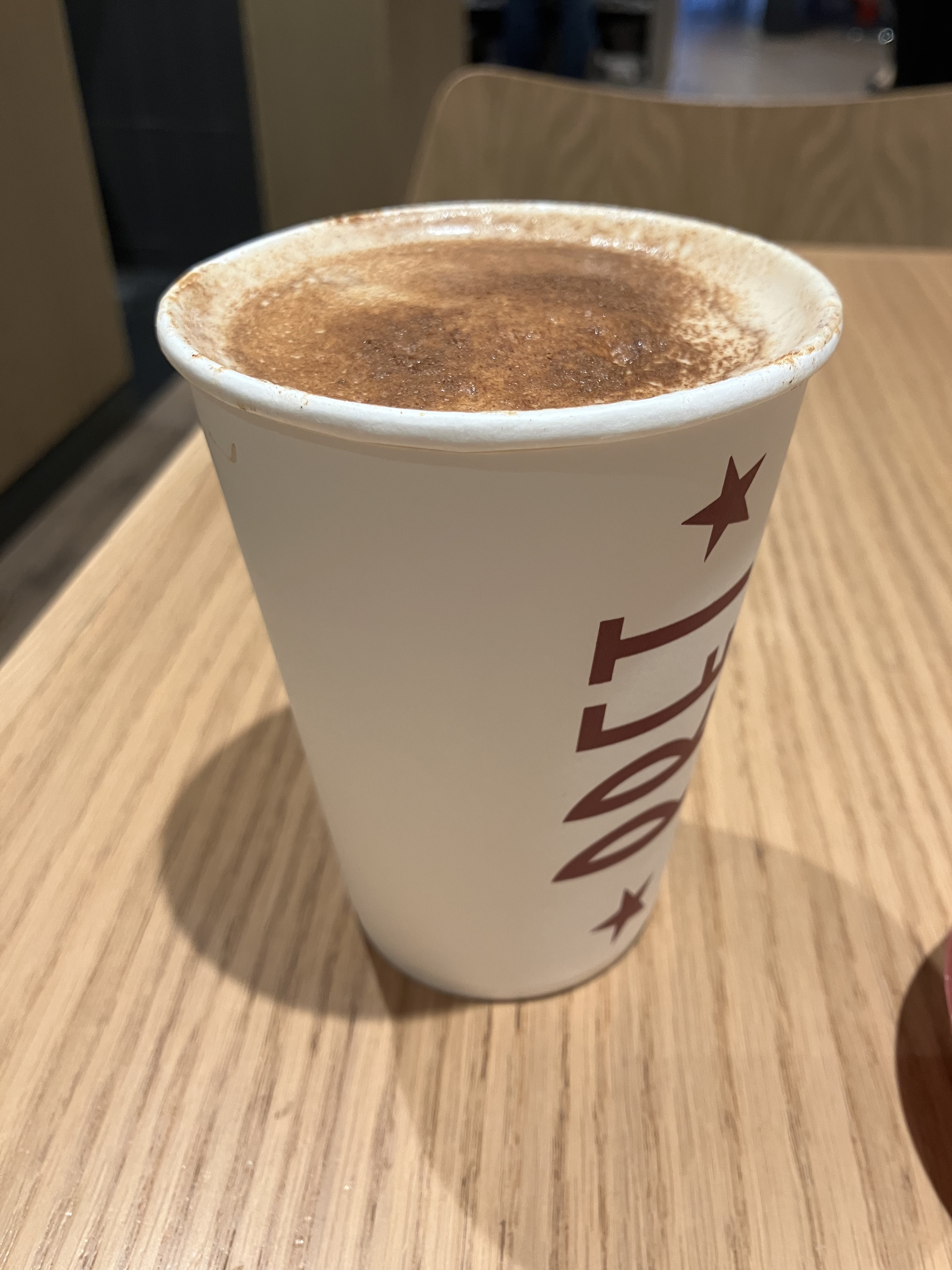
Hot pumpkin spice latte sold by Pret a Manger

Following the success of Starbucks' pumpkin spice latte, other major chains introduced similar seasonal beverages, including Dunkin' Donuts in 2007 and McDonald's in 2013. In 2021, Starbucks sales increased 10% week-over-week during the first week of its pumpkin spice latte sales, referred to as the "PSL effect". Dunkin' Donuts saw an 8.4% sales increase during the introduction of its pumpkin spice beverages in 2019, maintaining elevated sales the following week, with foot traffic rising 3% on the day of Starbucks' pumpkin spice latte launch.

In 2023, when Starbucks rolled out the pumpkin spice latte nationally, foot traffic rose 24.1% compared to an average weekday, with some states experiencing increases of 42–45%. Traffic remained elevated in the following three days, ranging from 11.3% to 15.9% depending on the day. Dunkin' Donuts reported similar traffic spikes during the rollout of its fall menu. For example, in 2021, foot traffic increased 12.2% in the first four days of its fall release, compared with the prior three weeks.

== See also ==
- List of coffee beverages
- List of squash and pumpkin dishes
