= Mixed spice =

Blend of sweet spices

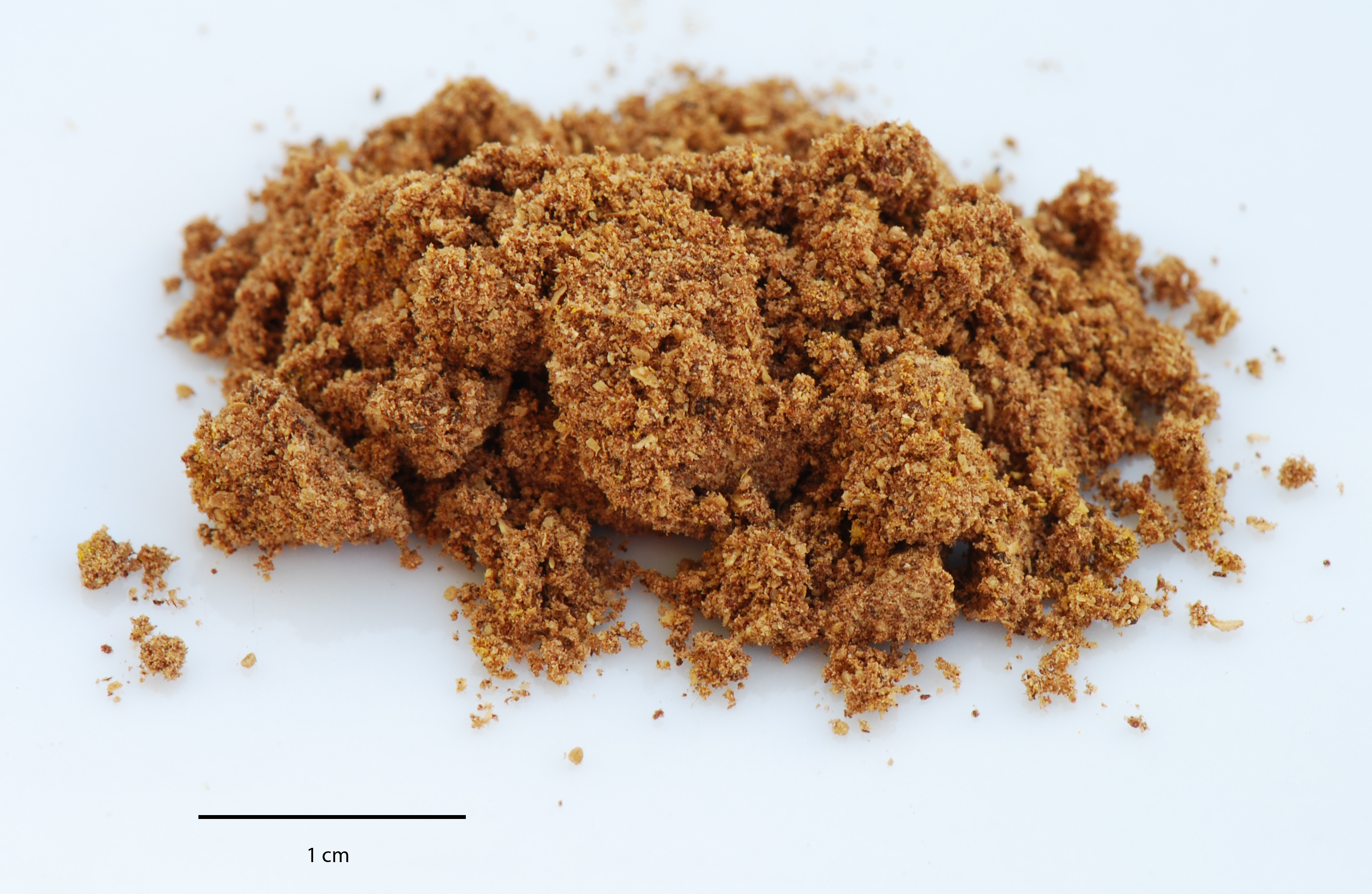
A commercial mixed spice mixture.

Mixed spice, also called pudding spice, is a British blend of sweet spices, similar to the pumpkin pie spice used in the United States. Cinnamon is the dominant flavour, with ginger and allspice. It is often used in baking, or to complement fruits or other sweet foods.

The term "mixed spice" has been used for this blend of spices in cookbooks at least as far back as 1828 and probably much earlier.

Mixed spice is very similar to a Dutch spice mix called koekkruiden or speculaaskruiden, which are used for example to spice food associated with the Dutch Sinterklaas celebration at December 5. It is generally used for sweet pastries eaten during the cold season, such as speculaas (a kind of shortbread) and appeltaart (apple pastry). Koekkruiden can contain cardamom, in addition to cinnamon, cloves and allspice, and sometimes also nutmeg. The tradition of pastries and dishes containing mixed spices together with the frequent use of chocolate during traditional festivities has its roots in the Dutch colonial past.

This spice blend is also used in Poland, where it is commonly known as gingerbread spice. The mix consists of aromatic and pungent spices whose composition may vary slightly by region. Typical ingredients include cinnamon, cloves, nutmeg, ginger, cardamom, coriander, allspice, and pepper. It is primarily used in sweet baked goods during the Christmas season, particularly in gingerbread cake and gingerbread cookies, which are well known internationally.

== Ingredients ==
Mixed spice typically contains:

- Cinnamon (or cassia)
- Nutmeg
- Allspice

It may also contain, or commonly have added to it:

- Cloves
- Ginger
- Coriander (seed)
- Caraway
- Cayenne pepper (historically)

== See also ==
- Garam masala
- Spice mix
