= Salvia haematodes =

Salvia haematodes can refer to:

- Salvia haematodes L., a synonym of Salvia pratensis subsp. haematodes (L.) Arcang.
- Salvia haematodes Scop., a synonym of Salvia sclarea L.
