= Buknu =

Mixture of several spices

- Type: Spice mix
- Place of origin: India
- Region or state: Uttar Pradesh

Buknu is a powdered mixture of several spices popular in parts of Uttar Pradesh, India.

Buknu is a very ancient recipe and is claimed to have medicinal values. It is used as both a spice and a condiment. Buknu's main ingredients include amchoor, salt, turmeric, cumin seeds, asafoetida, black cumin, black cardamom, and oil.

The recipe for Buknu likely originated in the [Kanpur city] of Uttar Pradesh.

== See also ==
- Indian cuisine
- List of Indian spices
