= Powder-forte =

Medieval spice powder

Powder-forte (poudre forte) was a medieval spice mix similar to poudre douce, but often incorporating more pungent flavors like pepper. Spice mixes like powder-forte were a common ingredient in the recorded recipes of medieval cuisine, often used in combination with foods that are not heavily spiced in modern preparations. One example is a recipe for cherries, washed clean with wine and filtered through a cloth, then heated with "white grease" and rice flour in a pot until stiff. To this cherry mixture, the cook would add honey, vinegar, egg yolk and "strong powder" - in this case, a mix of cinnamon and cypress root. Along with poudre douce, poudre fine and poudre lombard it is one of four medieval spice mixtures found throughout an assortment of medieval cookery manuscripts.
