= Piperlonguminine =

Names
- Preferred IUPAC name (2E,4E)-5-(2H-1,3-Benzodioxol-5-yl)-N-(2-methylpropyl)penta-2,4-dienamide

Identifiers
CAS Number	5950-12-9
3D model (JSmol)	Interactive image
ChEMBL	ChEMBL253973
ChemSpider	4478660
PubChem CID	5320621
UNII	HN39MC8KIO
CompTox Dashboard (EPA)	DTXSID401021742
- InChI: InChI=1S/C16H19NO3/c1-12(2)10-17-16(18)6-4-3-5-13-7-8-14-15(9-13)20-11-19-14/h3-9,12H,10-11H2,1-2H3,(H,17,18)/b5-3+,6-4+ Key: WHAAPCGHVWVUEX-GGWOSOGESA-N; InChI=1/C16H19NO3/c1-12(2)10-17-16(18)6-4-3-5-13-7-8-14-15(9-13)20-11-19-14/h3-9,12H,10-11H2,1-2H3,(H,17,18)/b5-3+,6-4+ Key: WHAAPCGHVWVUEX-GGWOSOGEBI
- SMILES: CC(C)CNC(=O)/C=C/C=C/C1=CC2=C(C=C1)OCO2

Properties
Chemical formula	C_{16}H_{19}NO_{3}
Molar mass	273.332 g·mol^{−1}
Melting point	167-169 °C (332.6-336.2 °F; 440-442K)
Solubility	DMSO
- Except where otherwise noted, data are given for materials in their standard state (at 25 °C [77 °F], 100 kPa). Infobox references

Piperlonguminine is an alkaloid amide isolated from Piper longum, commonly known as the long pepper.
