= Qâlat daqqa =

Tunisian spice blend

Qâlat daqqa (also spelled gâlat dagga)(Arabic: قلات دقة, romanized: qālat daqah), or Tunisian Five Spices, is a spice blend originating from Tunisia. It is made of cloves, nutmeg, cinnamon, peppercorns, and grains of paradise mixed and ground, depending on its use, between a coarse grind and a fine powder. This spice blend is used to as both an aromatic and seasoning for meats and vegetable dishes. The flavor of the mixture is described as being "sweet and warm".

== Uses ==
Qâlat daqqa is utilized in several manners:

1. In meats it is used as either a dry rub or as an ingredient to marinades. It is noted for use in lamb tajines.
2. In vegetable dishes, it is noted for imparting a warm flavor, especially in pumpkin- or eggplant-based dishes. It can also be used in dishes like fruit crisps or other fruit desserts and pies
