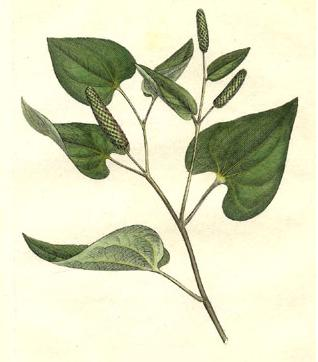
- Long pepper's leaves and fruits

Scientific classification
- Kingdom: Plantae
- Clade: Tracheophytes
- Clade: Angiosperms
- Clade: Magnoliids
- Order: Piperales
- Family: Piperaceae
- Genus: Piper
- Species: P. longum

Binomial name
- Piper longum L.

= Long pepper =

Species of plant cultivated for use as spice

Long pepper (Piper longum), sometimes called Indian long pepper or pippali, is a flowering vine in the family Piperaceae, cultivated for its fruit, which is usually dried and used as a spice and seasoning. Long pepper has a taste similar to, but is sweeter and more pungent than, its close relative Piper nigrum – from which black, green and white pepper are obtained.

The fruit of the pepper consists of many minuscule fruits – each about the size of a poppy seed – embedded in the surface of a flower spike that closely resembles a hazel tree catkin. Like Piper nigrum, the fruits contain the compound piperine, which contributes to their pungency. There are two other species of long pepper: Piper retrofractum, native to Java, Indonesia, and Piper capense, native to tropical and southern Africa. The fruits of this plant are often confused with chili peppers, which belong to the genus Capsicum, originally from the Americas.

== History ==
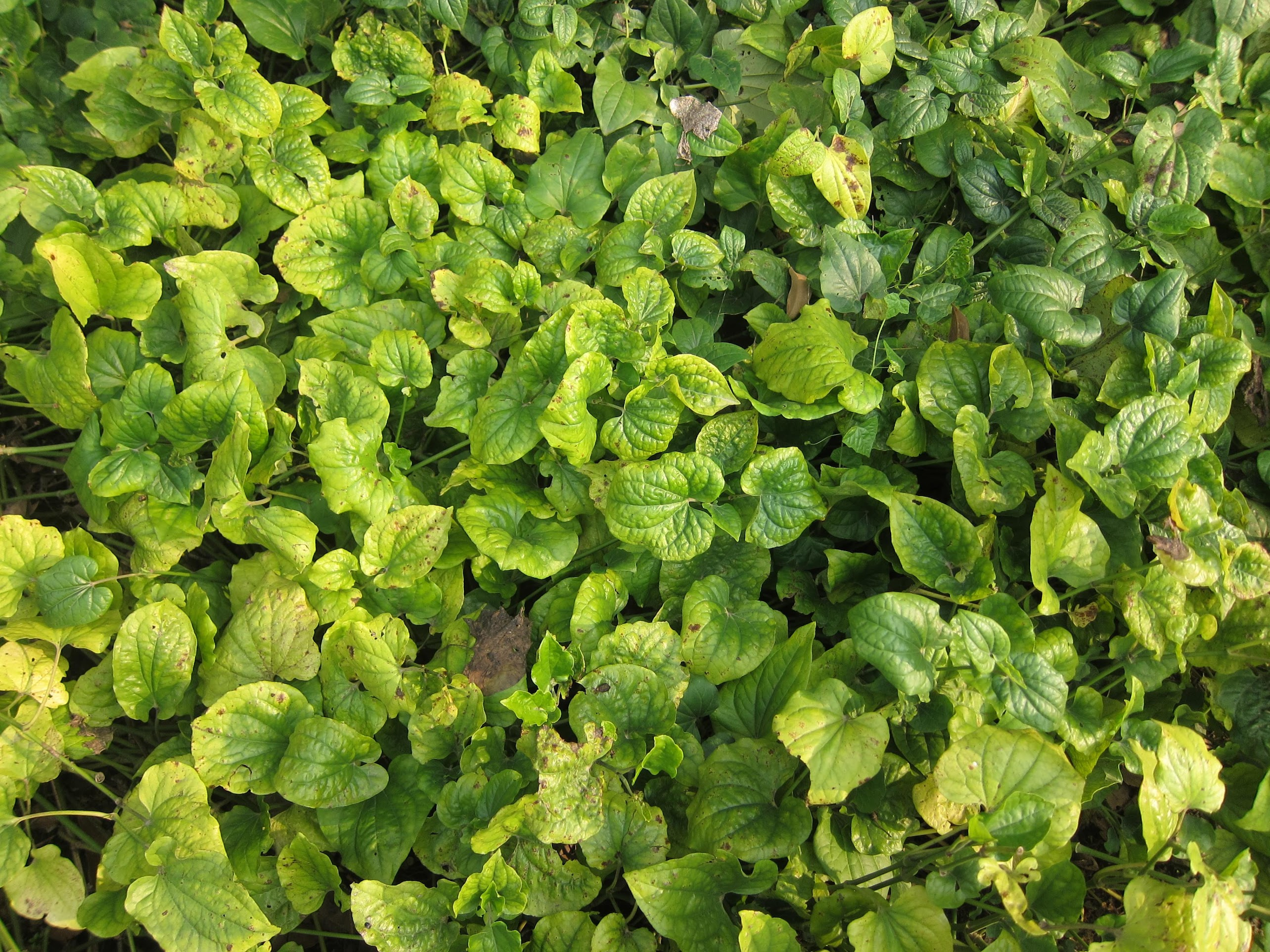
Guangxi Medicinal Botanical Garden, Nanning

Use of long pepper occurred in Greece in the sixth or fifth century BCE, though Hippocrates discussed it as a medicine rather than a spice. Among the Greeks and Romans and prior to the Columbian exchange, long pepper was a common spice.

The ancient history of long pepper is often interlinked with that of black pepper (Piper nigrum). Theophrastus distinguished the two in his work of botany. The Romans knew of both but their word for pepper usually meant black pepper. Pliny erroneously believed dried black pepper and long pepper came from the same plant.

Round, or black, pepper began to compete with long pepper in Europe from the twelfth century and had displaced it by the fourteenth. The quest for cheaper and more dependable sources of black pepper fueled the Age of Discovery.

After the discovery of the American continents and of chili pepper, called by the Spanish pimiento, employing their word for long pepper, the popularity of long pepper faded away. Chili peppers, some of which, when dried, are similar in shape and taste to long pepper, were easier to grow in a variety of locations more convenient to Europe. Today, long pepper is a rarity in general commerce.

=== Etymology ===
The word pepper itself is derived from the word for long pepper, Sanskrit pippali. The plant itself is a native of India. The word pepper in bell pepper, referring to completely different plants under genus Capsicum, is of the same etymology. That usage began in the 16th century.

== Usage ==
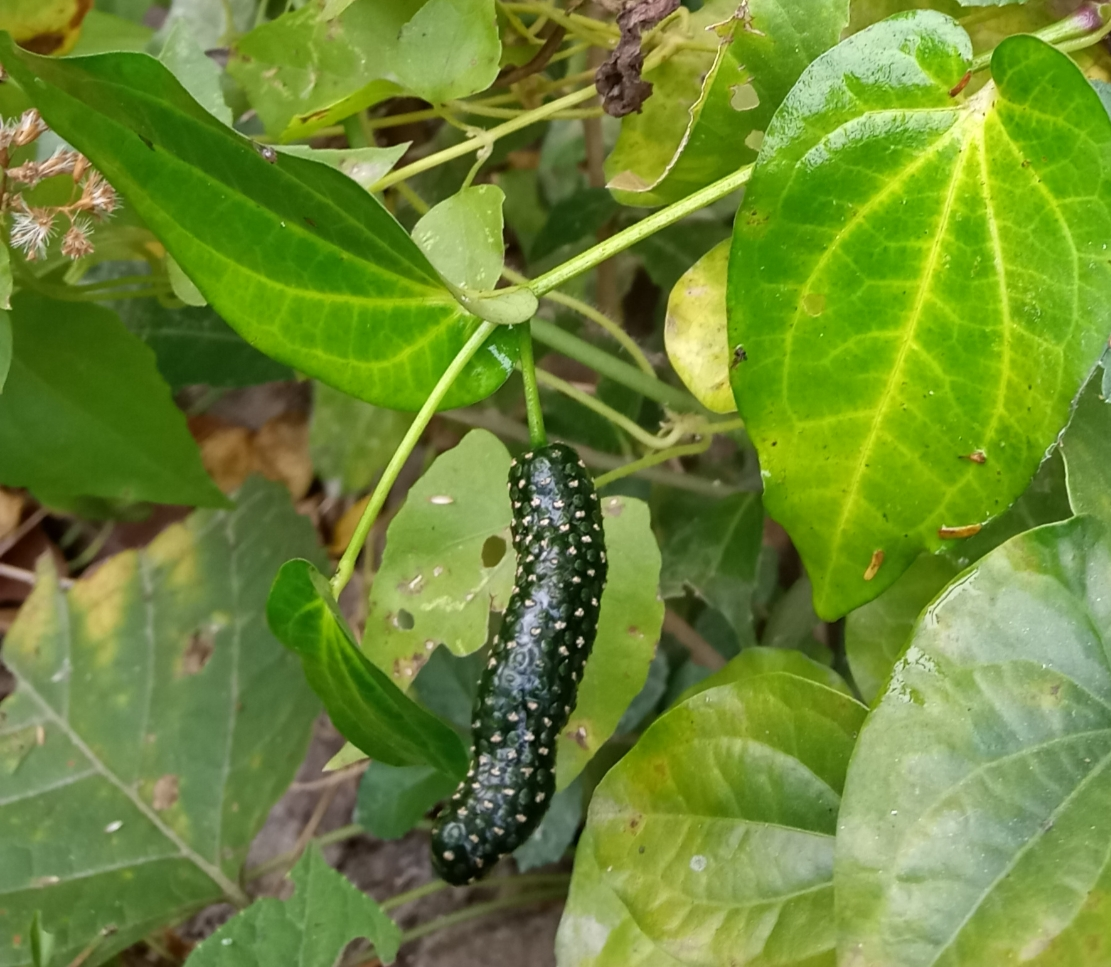
A pippali fruit hanging from vine

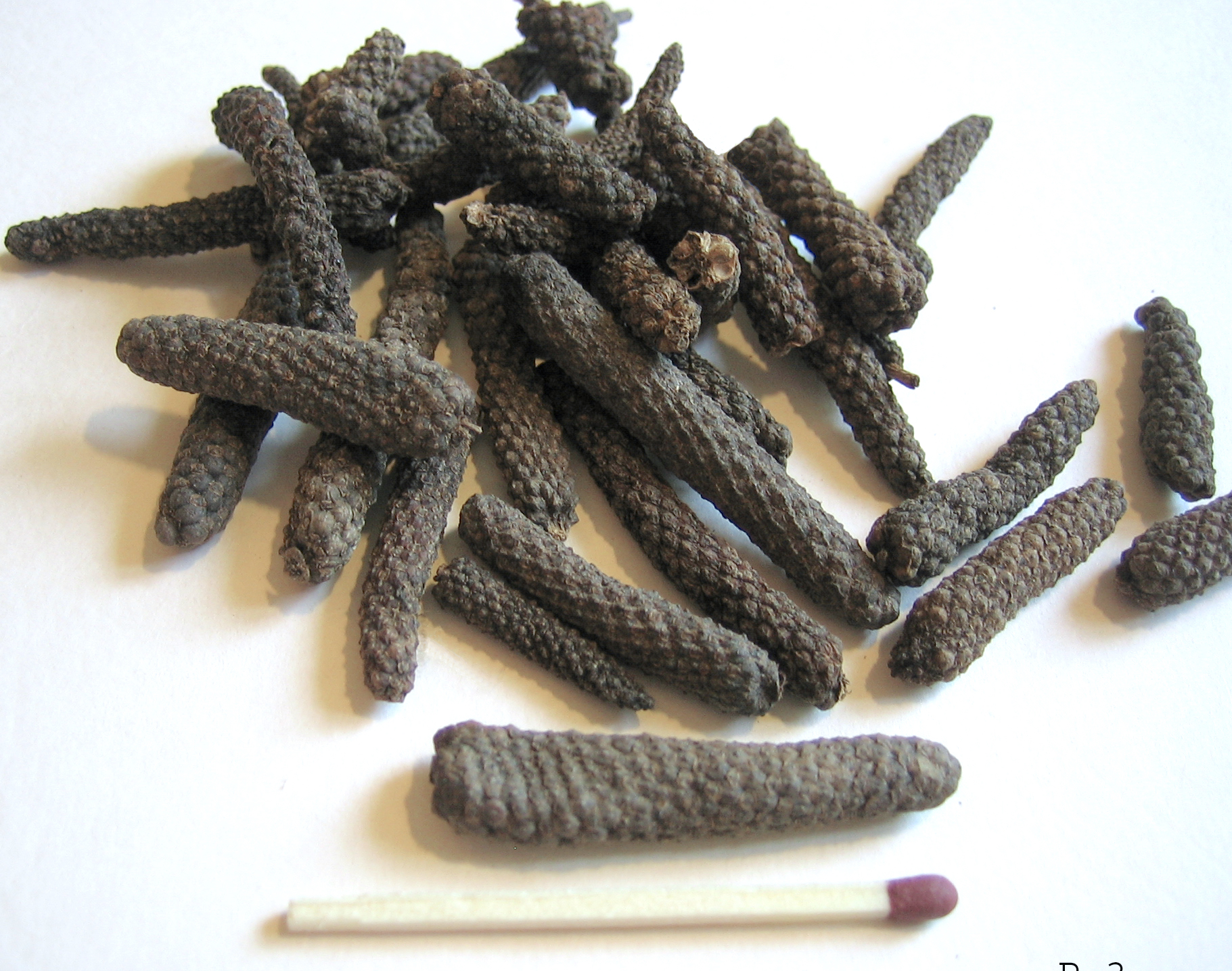
Dried long pepper catkins

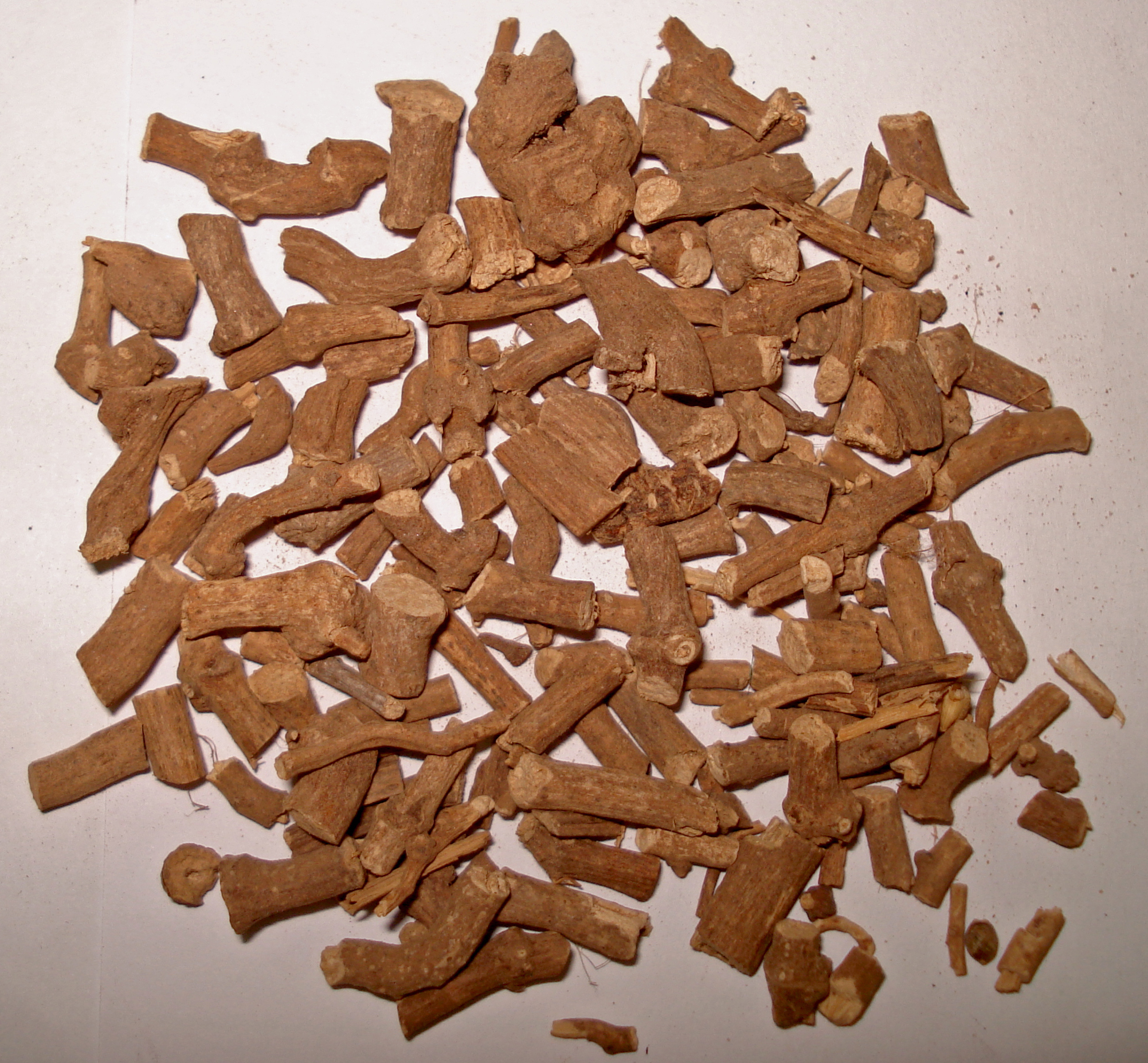
Ganthoda, the root of long pepper

Though often used in medieval times in spice mixes like "strong powder", long pepper is today a very rare ingredient in European cuisines, but it can still be found in Indian and Nepalese vegetable pickles, some North African spice mixtures, and in Indonesian and Malaysian cooking. It is readily available at some Indian grocery stores, where it is usually labeled pippali. Pippali is the main spice of nihari, a popular meat stew from India, originating in the Indian metropolis of Lucknow, and one of the national dishes of Pakistan.

== See also ==
- Piperlonguminine
