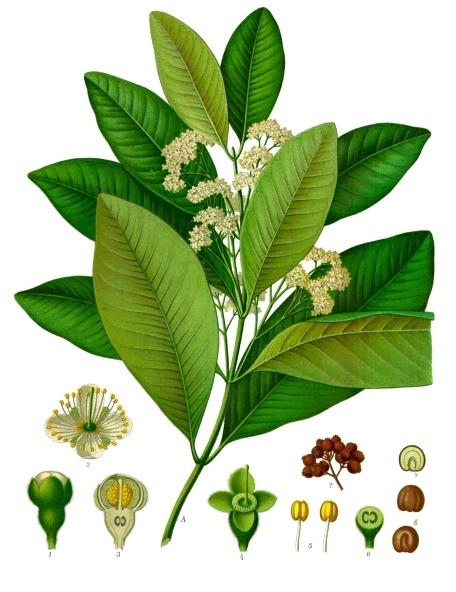
- Illustration of twig, flowers, and fruits

Conservation status
- Least Concern (IUCN 3.1)

Scientific classification
- Kingdom: Plantae
- Clade: Tracheophytes
- Clade: Angiosperms
- Clade: Eudicots
- Clade: Rosids
- Order: Myrtales
- Family: Myrtaceae
- Genus: Pimenta
- Species: P. dioica

Binomial name
- Pimenta dioica (L.) Merr.

Synonyms
- List: Caryophyllus pimenta (L.) Mill.; Eugenia micrantha Bertol.; Eugenia pimenta (L.) DC.; Evanesca crassifolia Raf. nom. illeg.; Evanesca micrantha Bertol.; Myrtus aromatica Poir. nom. illeg.; Myrtus aromatica Salisb. nom. illeg.; Myrtus dioica L.; Myrtus pimenta L.; Myrtus piperita Sessé & Moc.; Pimenta aromatica Kostel. nom. illeg.; Pimenta communis Benth. & Hook.f.; Pimenta officinalis Lindl.; Pimenta pimenta (L.) H.Karst. nom. inval.; Pimenta vulgaris Bello; Pimenta vulgaris Lindl.; Pimentus aromatica Raf. nom. illeg.; Pimentus geminata Raf.; Pimentus vera Raf. nom. illeg.

= Allspice =

Pungent fruit of the tree Pimenta dioica

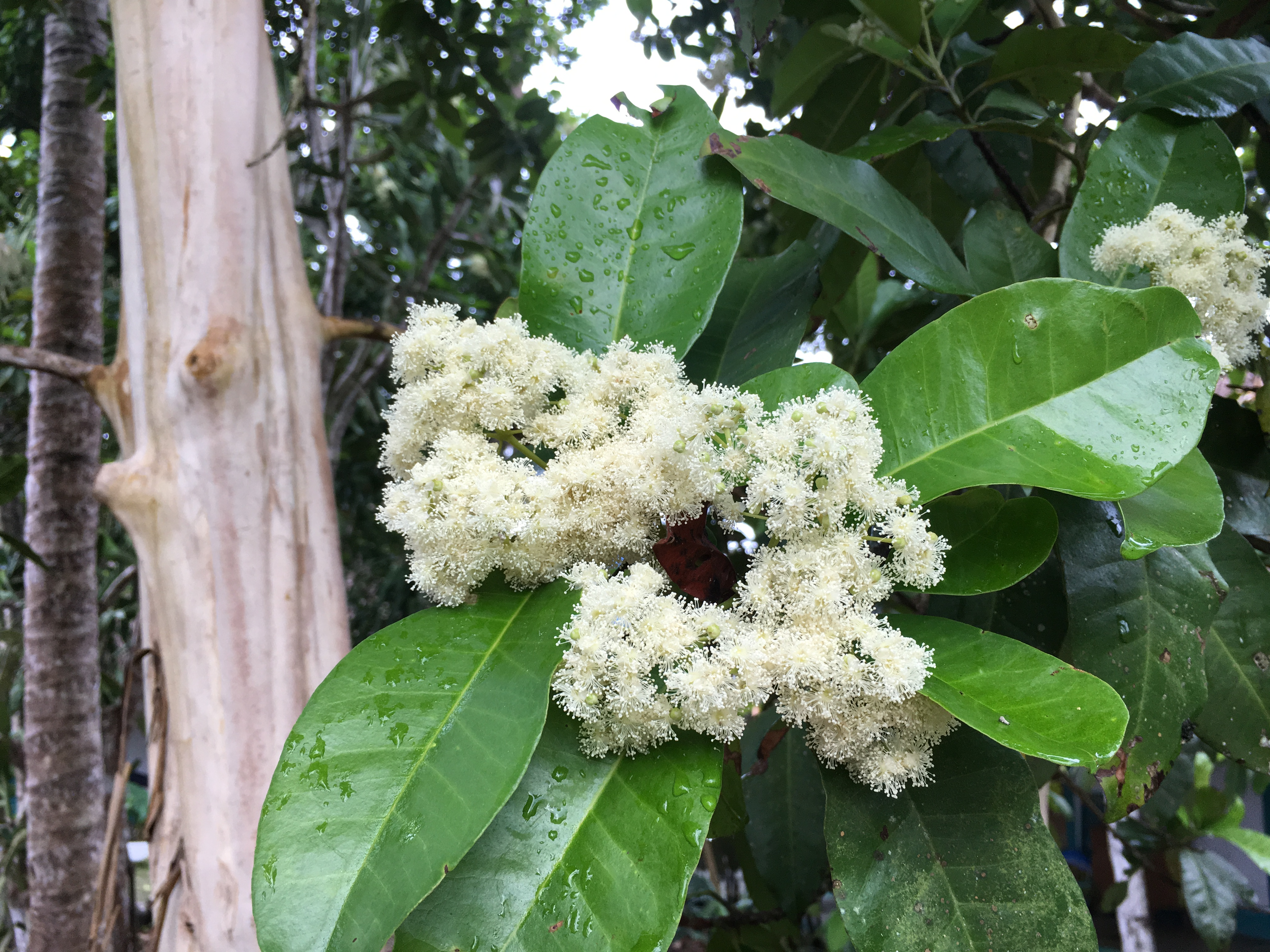
Piment flower in Uaxactún, north of Tikal National Park, Guatemala

Allspice, also known as Jamaica pepper, myrtle pepper, pimenta, or pimento, (Note: Outside Jamaica, pimento typically refers to a red, heart-shaped sweet pepper.) is the dried unripe berry of Pimenta dioica, a midcanopy tree native to the Greater Antilles, southern Mexico (in Nahuatl: xocoxochitl), and Central America, now cultivated in many warm parts of the world.

The name allspice was coined as early as 1621 by the English, who valued it as a spice that combined the flavours of cinnamon, nutmeg, and clove. Contrary to common misconception, it is not a mixture of spices. In West Indian, Middle Eastern, and Northern European cuisines the spice is frequently used as part of savory dishes, such as the jerk spice mix from Jamaica, while in North American cooking it’s often a part of desserts, such as pumpkin pie spice.

Several unrelated fragrant shrubs are called "Carolina allspice" (Calycanthus floridus), "Japanese allspice" (Chimonanthus praecox), or "wild allspice" (Lindera benzoin).

== Cultivation ==
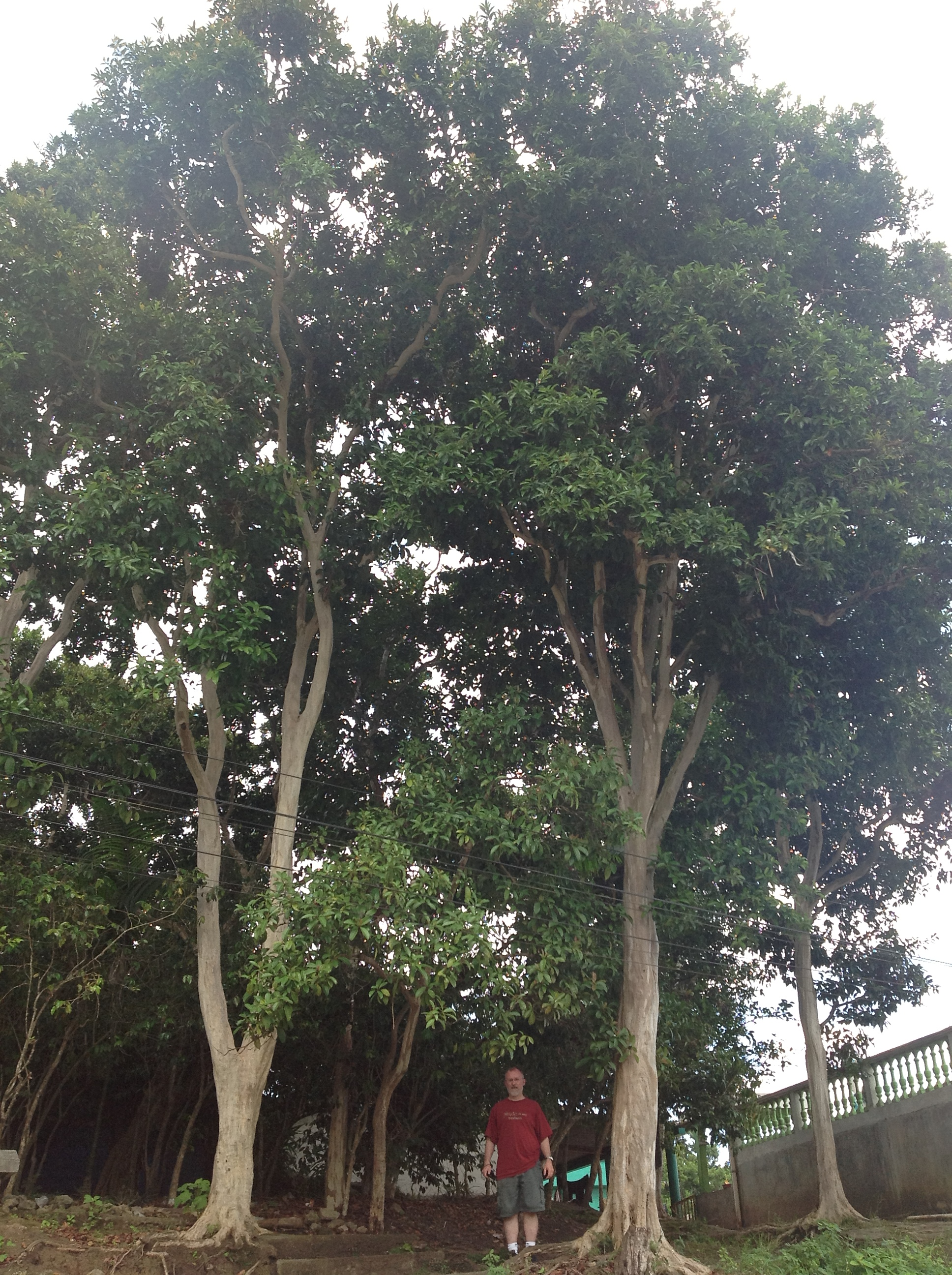
P. dioica mature trees in Guatemala

The allspice tree, classified as an evergreen shrub, can reach 10–18 m (33–59 ft) in height. Allspice can be a small, scrubby tree, quite similar to the bay laurel in size and form. It can also be a tall canopy tree, sometimes grown to provide shade for coffee trees planted underneath it. It can be grown outdoors in the tropics and subtropics with normal garden soil and watering. Smaller plants can be killed by frost; larger plants are more tolerant. It adapts well to container culture and can be kept as a houseplant or in a greenhouse.

Pimenta grows in Tonga and in Hawaii, where it has become naturalized on Kauaʻi and Maui. Jamaica remains the leading source of the plant, although some is grown by other countries in the same region.

Allspice was found only on the island of Jamaica, where birds readily spread the seeds. To protect the pimenta trade, Jamaican growers guarded against export of the plant. Many attempts at growing the pimenta from seeds were reported, but all failed. Eventually, passage through the avian digestive tract, whether due to the acidity or the elevated temperature, was found to be essential for germinating the seeds, and successful germination elsewhere was enabled.

== Production ==
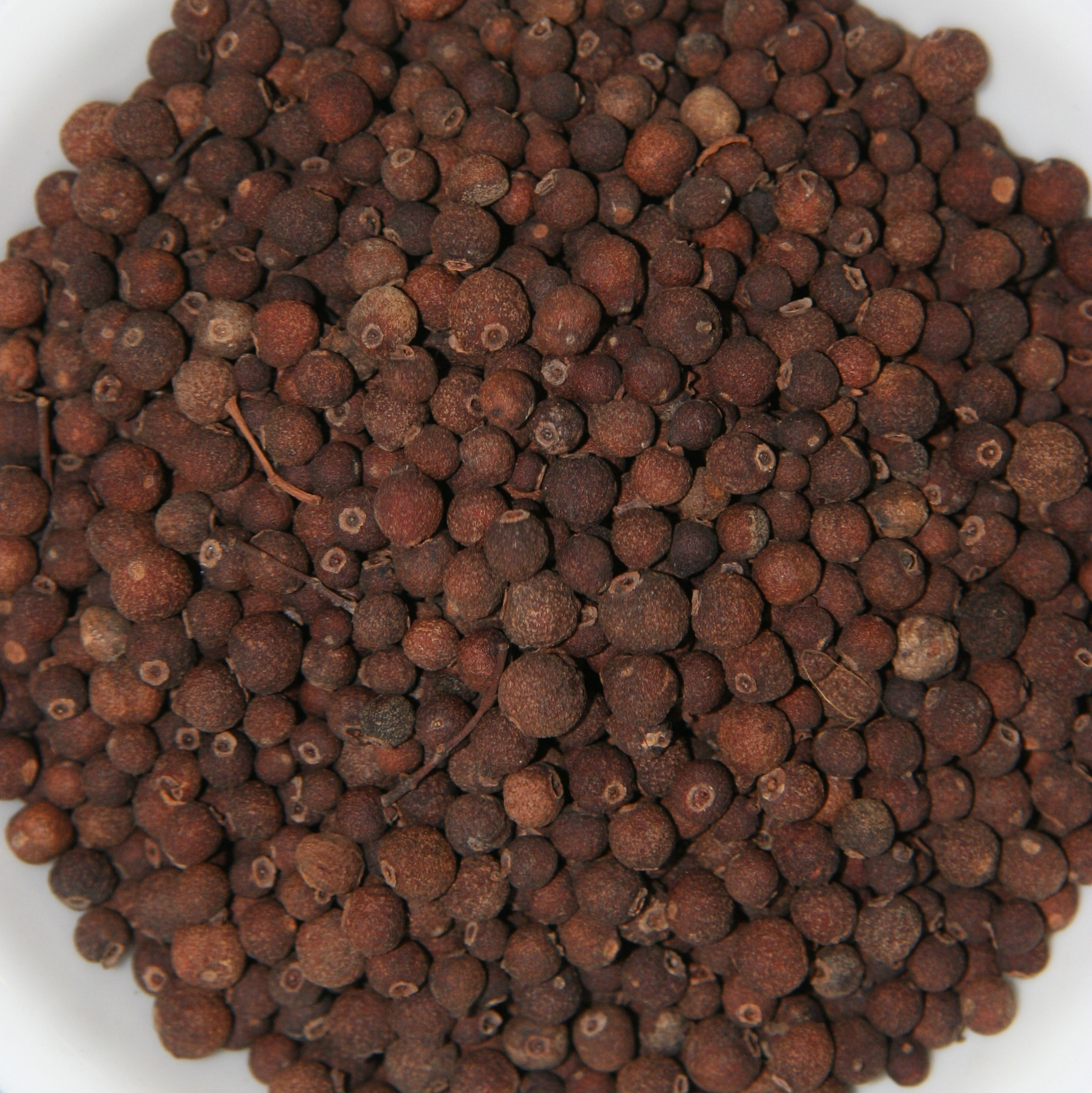
Whole allspice berries

Allspice is the dried fruit of the Pimenta dioica plant. The fruits are picked when green and unripe, and are traditionally dried in the sun. When dry, they are brown and resemble large, smooth peppercorns. Fresh leaves are similar in texture to bay leaves and similarly used in cooking. Leaves and wood are often used for smoking meats where allspice is a local crop.

Care must be taken during drying to ensure that the volatile oils in the fruit, such as eugenol, remain in the end products rather than being driven out by the drying process.

== Uses ==
Allspice is one of the most important ingredients of West Indian cuisine, including Jamaican cuisine. Under the name pimento, it is used in Jamaican jerk seasoning, and traditionally its wood was used to smoke jerk in Jamaica. In parts of the West Indies, an allspice liqueur is produced under the name "pimento dram". In Mexican cuisine, it is used in many dishes, where it is known as pimienta gorda.

Allspice is also indispensable in Middle Eastern cuisine, particularly in the Levant, where it is used to flavour a variety of stews and meat dishes, as well as tomato sauce. In Arab cuisine, for example, many main dishes use allspice as the only spice.

In Northern European and North American cooking, it is an ingredient in commercial sausage preparations and curry powders, and in pickling.

In the United States, it is used mostly in desserts, but it is also responsible for giving Cincinnati-style chili its distinctive aroma and flavour. Allspice is commonly used in Great Britain, and appears in many dishes. In Portugal, whole allspice is used heavily in traditional stews cooked in large terracotta pots in the Azores islands.

In the United Kingdom it is a dominant flavour in the condiment Brown sauce.

Allspice is also one of the most used spices in Polish cuisine (used in most dishes, soups and stews) and is commonly known under the name English herb (Polish: ziele angielskie) since Britain was its major exporter.

Allspice is an important part of Swedish, Finnish and Norwegian cuisine. Whole allspice is used to flavour soups as well as stews such as Karelian hot pot. Ground allspice is also used in various dishes, such as minced meat sauces, Swedish meatballs, and different cakes.

== See also ==
- Mixed spice
