= Hilbeh (dessert) =

Palestinian semolina fenugreek dessert

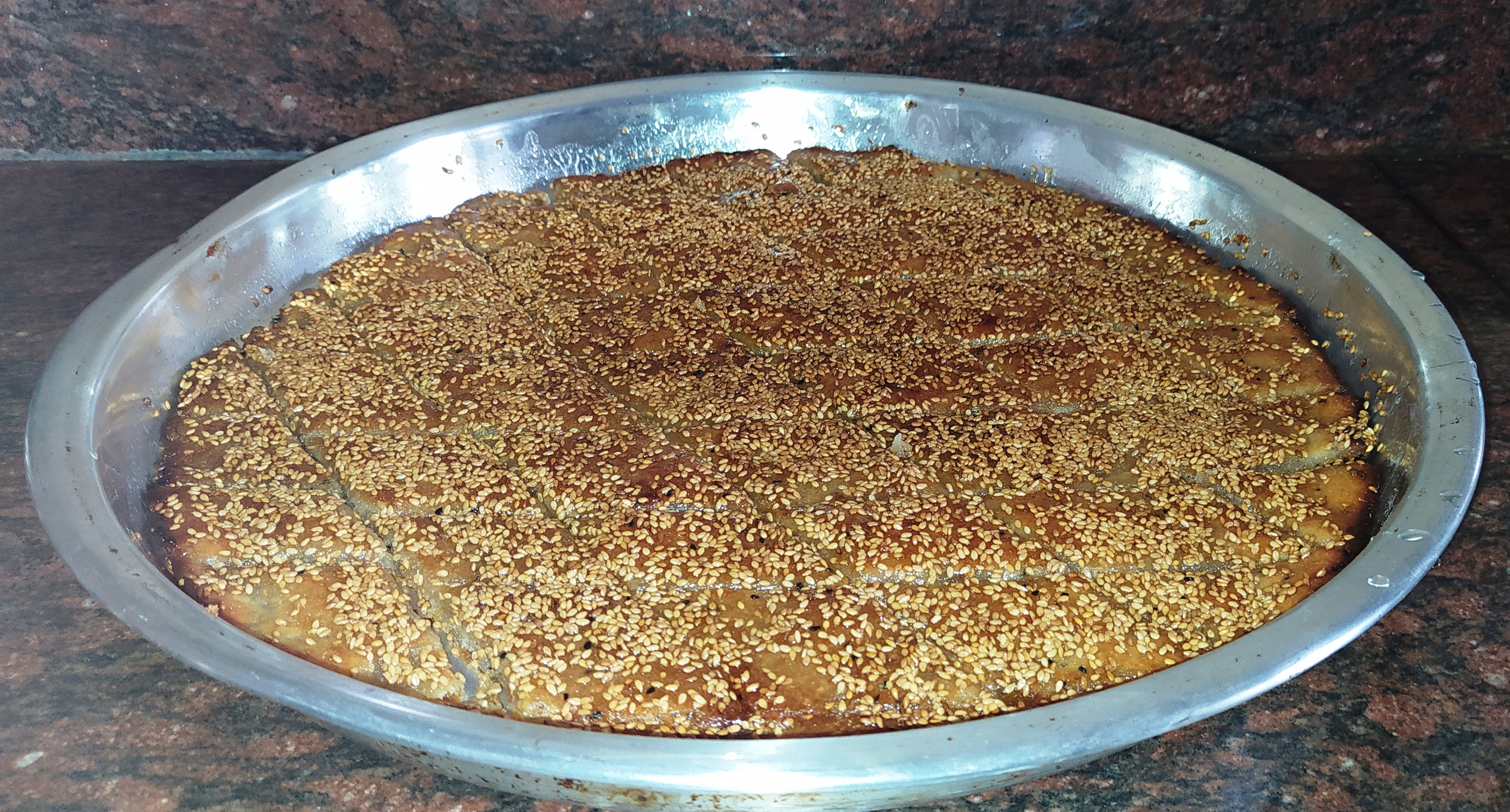
- Type: Dessert
- Region or state: Levant
- Main ingredients: Semolina, fenugreek, olive oil

In Palestinian cuisine, hilbeh, hulbah, or fenugreek cake (Arabic: حلبة) is a dessert made from fenugreek seeds, olive oil, and semolina, topped with nuts, nigella seeds, or sesame, then coated in sugar syrup, which soaks into the cake.

== Etymology ==
It is named after the Arabic name for fenugreek, which is hilba (Arabic: حلبة, romanized: ḥilbah). Thus, the name hilbeh can refer to different dishes that use fenugreek; for example, there is a drink called hilbeh, and a condiment named hilbeh. Sometimes the name 'fenugreek cake' is used instead in the English language.

It is sometimes referred to as saniyit hulba (Arabic: صينية حلبة, lit. 'tray of fenugreek').

== Ingredients and preparation ==
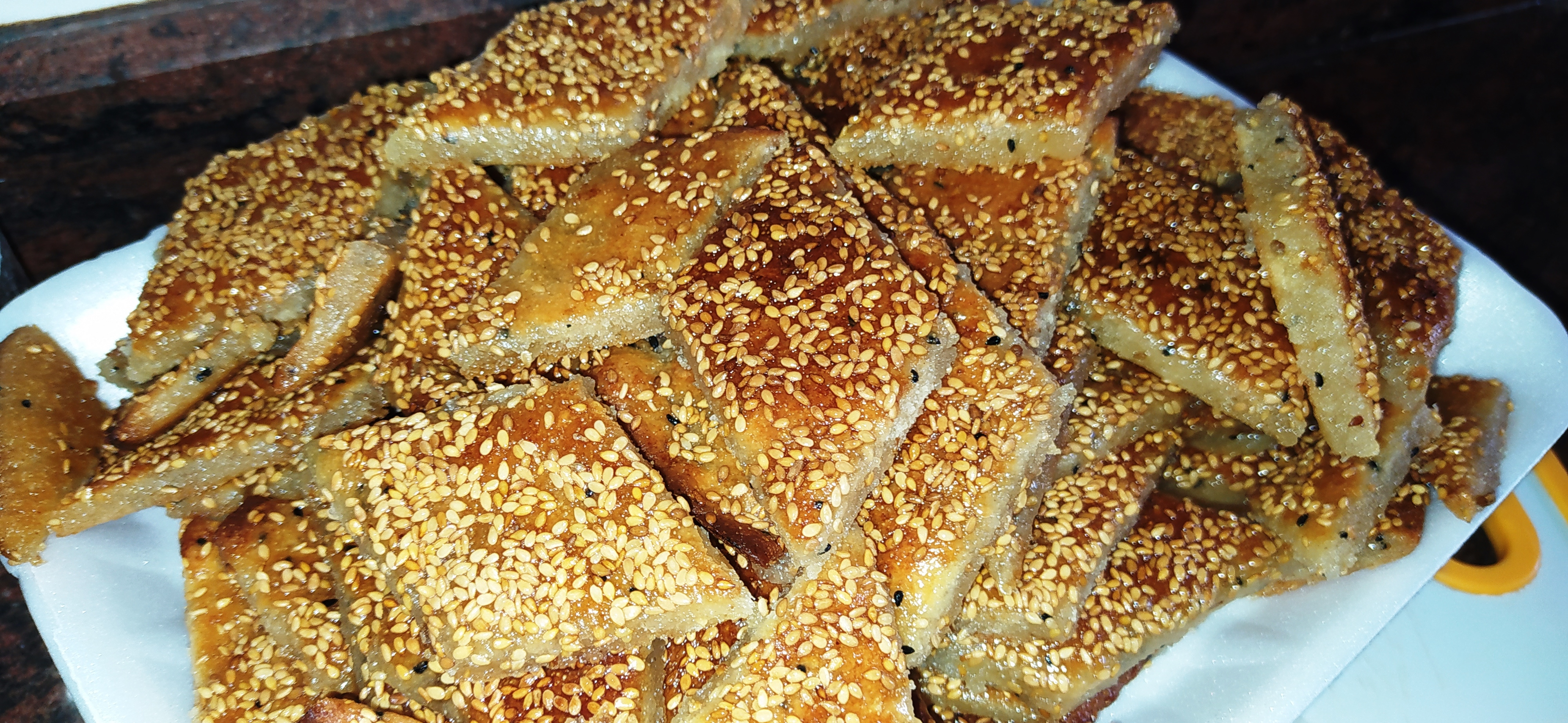
Sliced Hilbeh, the diamond cutting pattern can be seen on the pieces

The fenugreek seeds need to be soaked in water for a while before being used to remove any bitter taste.

The cake is a simple semolina cake similar to basbousa, fenugreek seeds are mixed into a batter made of semolina flour and olive oil, which is then baked, and then sugar and rose water syrup is added to it as a topping along with sesame or nigella seeds. The cake is cut into diamond or rhombus shaped pieces by first cutting in straight horizontal lines then diagonal lines, forming a slanted grid shape.

== Consumption ==
Hilbeh is particularly popular in Palestine, but it is described as a "love it or hate it" dish. One of the factors limiting its popularity is the smell associated with fenugreek, caused by the chemical compound sotolon.

The dish is also popular among Bedouin people.

=== Traditional medicine ===
Fenugreek is believed to have various medicinal properties, such as improving blood flow, and aiding in breast feeding.

== See also ==
- Basbousa
- Qizha
- Sfouf
