= Cevizli Irmik Tatlısı =

Turkish cake

Cevizli irmik tatlısı
- Type: Cake
- Place of origin: Turkey
- Main ingredients: walnut, flour, cinnamon, semolina

Cevizli irmik tatlısı is a Turkish cake made primarily from walnuts and covered in a sweet syrup.

There are several variations of the dish, with unique ingredients used in both the syrup and cake. Some common additions include, but are not limited to, orange zest, cloves, brown sugar.

Other common desserts of this style are revani, şambali and şekerpare.
