= Basbousa =

Semolina or farina cake soaked in syrup

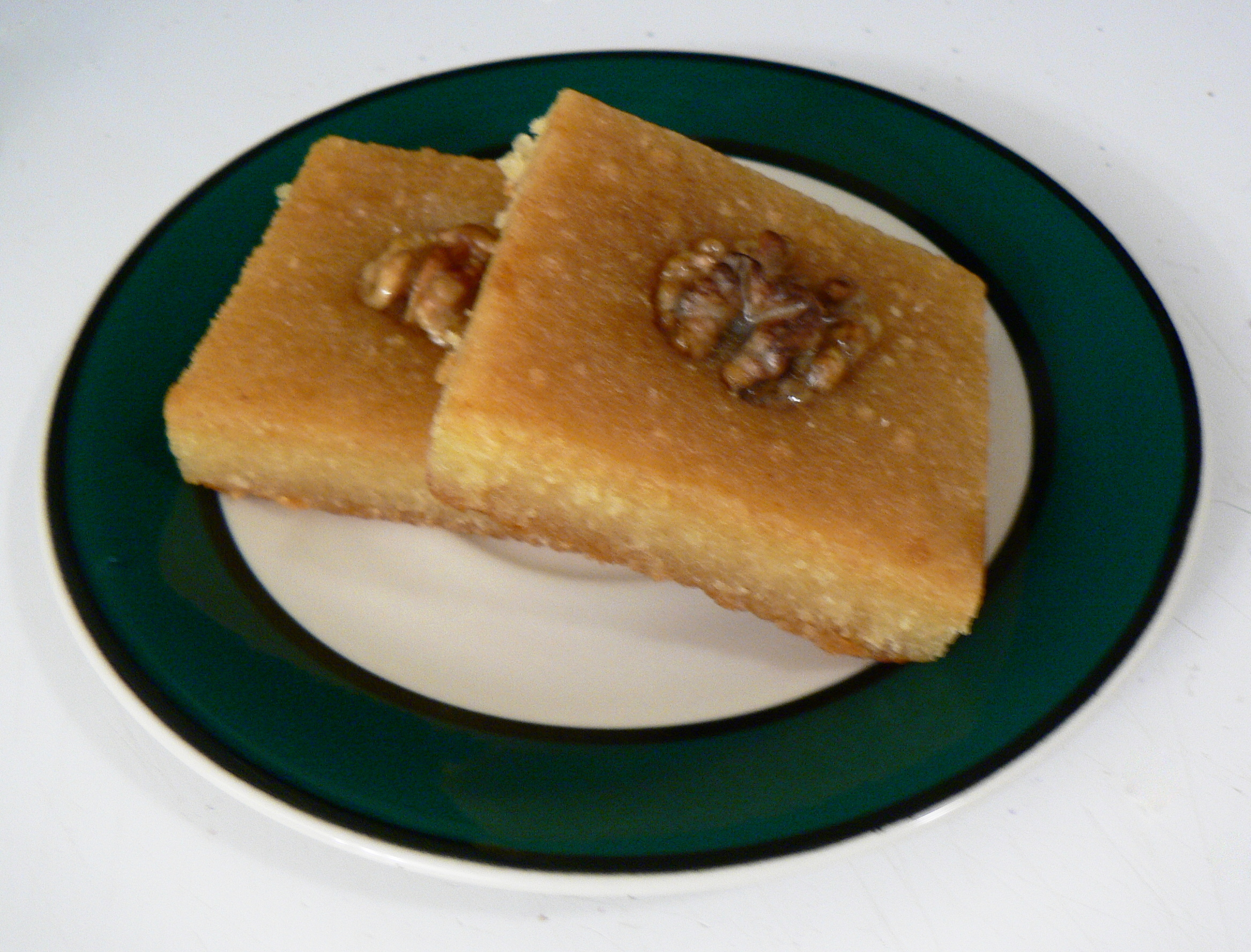
- Basbousa topped with walnuts
- Alternative names: Harisa, namoura, shambali, revani, kalb el-louz
- Type: Dessert
- Region or state: Middle East, Balkans and North Africa
- Serving temperature: Cold or warm
- Main ingredients: Semolina or farina, syrup

Basbousa (Arabic: بسبوسة, romanized: basbūsah, also known as harisa, nammoura, or revani) is a sweet, syrup-soaked semolina dessert popular throughout the Middle East, North Africa, Caucasus and the Balkans. The semolina batter is baked in a sheet pan, then sweetened with sugar syrup and typically cut into diamond (lozenge) shapes or squares.

== History ==
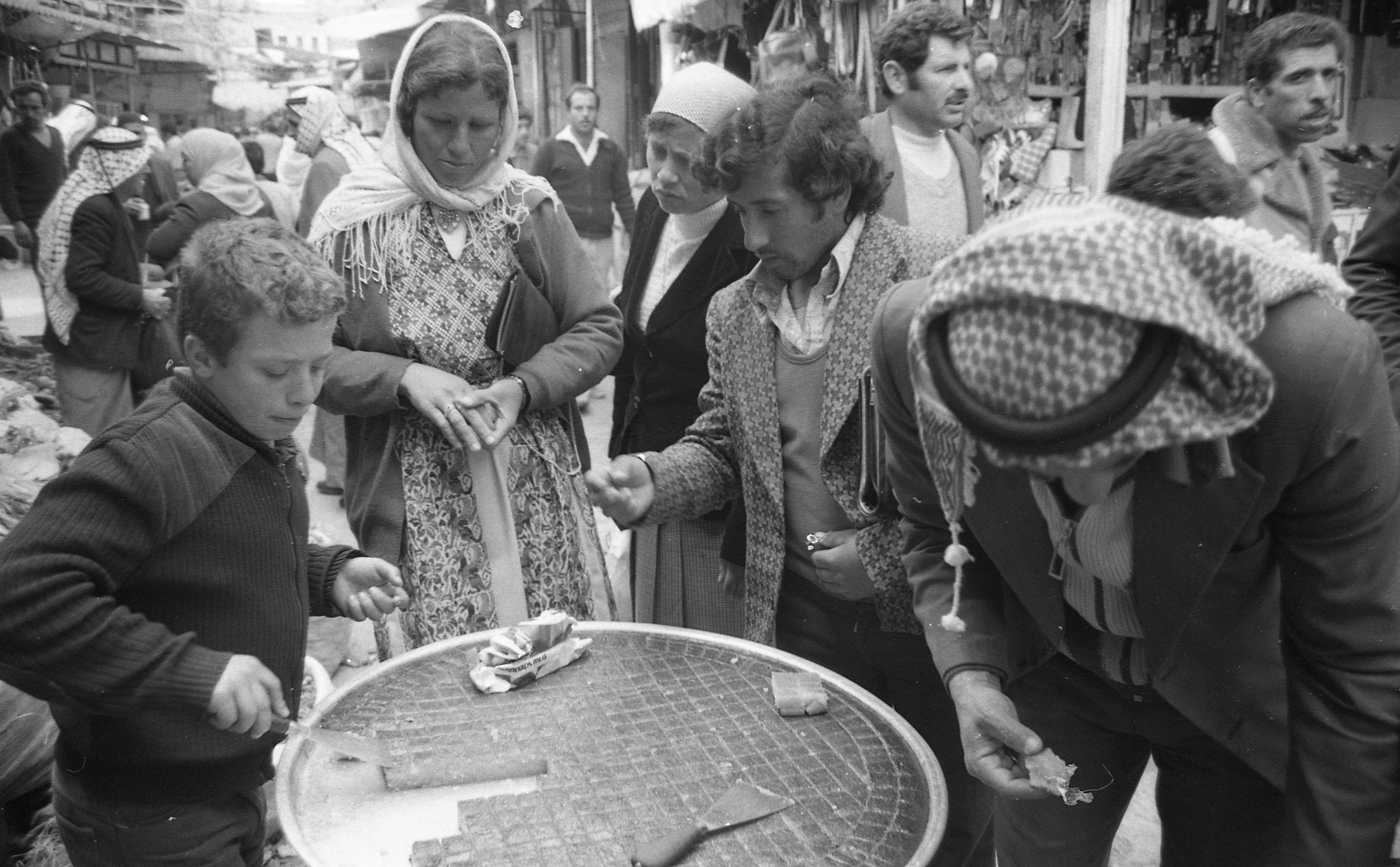
Basbousa seller in Nablus, 1983.

The Oxford Companion to Food (3rd edition) suggests that basbousa might have developed from a dish called ma'mounia, which was created around the 9th century Abbasid period. Ma'mounia was made by cooking rice in fat and syrup. This recipe was later adapted to use semolina, with the batter being cooked first and then soaked in syrup. According to food historian Gil Marks it is possible that semolina syrup cakes evolved from toasted semolina sweets like suji halva, as pastries and puddings in the middle east typically used semolina.

According to food historian Priscilla Mary Işın, a similar recipe is found in a 13th century Arabic-language cookbook from Al-Andalus, the book notes that the dessert was made in the region of Constantinople, she also notes that Ottoman revani was made by whisking all ingredients together until they became frothy. Ottoman revani included flour and a lot of eggs, but Ottoman street sellers used semolina and fewer eggs, or none at all. Chef Arto Der Haroutunian suggested that revani was popularized in Anatolia and the Balkans by the Byzantine Empire.

A recipe for revani (Ottoman Turkish: روانى) can be found in the 1844 Ottoman Turkish cookbook Melceü't-Tabbâhîn, it calls for baking a mixture of semolina, butter, sugar, and eggs in an oven then soaking it in sugar syrup and cutting it in "baklava shapes." Later 19th century mentions are found in the 1890 Ottoman Turkish to English dictionary by British lexicographer James Redhouse defined rewani (Ottoman Turkish: رواني) as "A kind of sponge-cake", it also defined rewaniji as a seller of said cake.

== Names ==
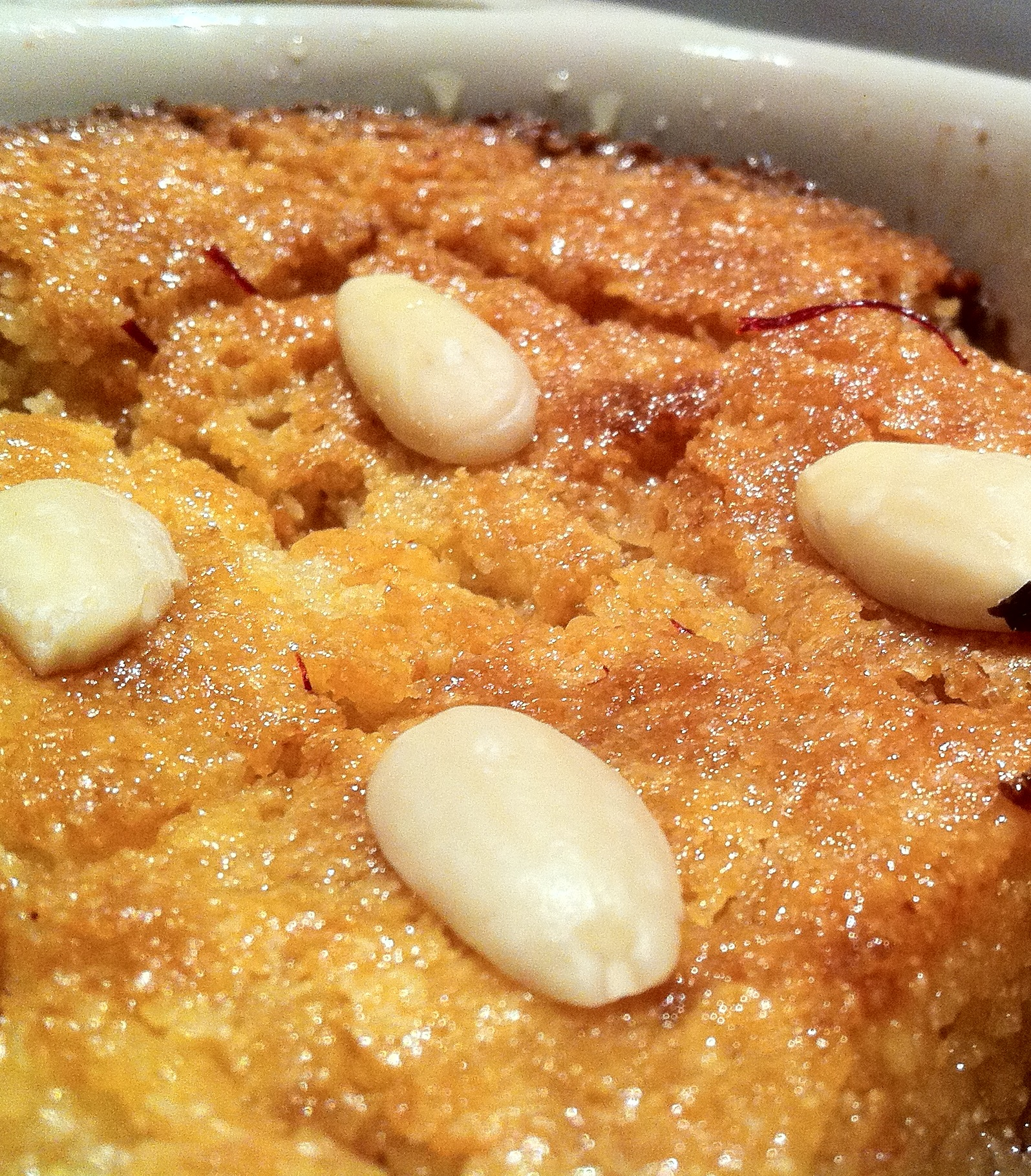
Basbousa in the Middle East, the Balkans, North Africa, East Africa topped with almonds

It is found in the cuisines of the Middle East, the Balkans and North Africa under a variety of names.

- Albanian: revani, Albanian definite form: revanija
- Arabic: بسبوسة basbūsah, هريسة harīsa, نمورة nammoura
- Armenian: Շամալի, romanized: shamali
- Bulgarian: реване, romanized: revane
- Cypriot Greek: σάμαλι shamali
- Greek: ρεβανί, romanized: revaní
- Ladino: tishpishti
- Macedonian: раванија, romanized: ravanija
- Somali: basbuusa
- Turkish: revani

Basbousa is the most common name for this dessert in the Middle East but it may be named differently depending on the region; it is often called "hareesa" in the Levant. Note that "harissa" in North Africa is a spicy red sauce.

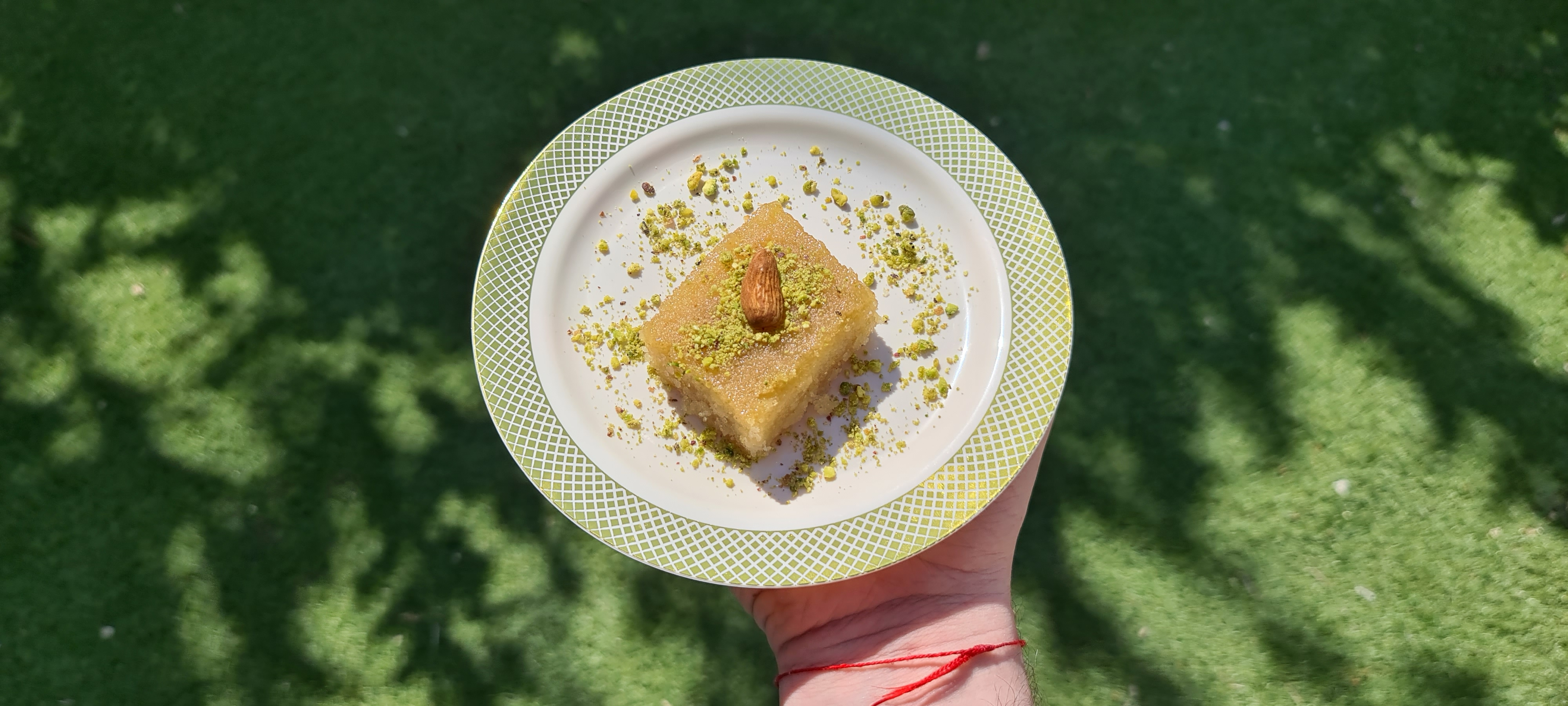
Vegan basbousa (egg replaced by apple sauce)

Şambali is also referred to as "Damascus dessert" or "Damascus honey". Şam in Turkish means "Damascus".

Basbousa is believed by some derive its name from a colloquial Arabic expression meaning "just a kiss" (بس بوسة).

The Turkish revani is derived from the Persian word for oil or butter (روغن). However, some claim that revani is derived from "Revan"; the Turkish name for Yerevan, and that the dessert was made to commomerate the Ottoman conquest of Yerevan by Sultan Murad IV.

According to Syrian historian Khayr al-Din al-Asadi, the name basbousa is derived from the Arabic verb bas (بس), meaning "to mix". He also wrote that the name namoura is derived from the Arabic namr (نمر), meaning tiger, derived from the colors of the dessert.

== Variations ==
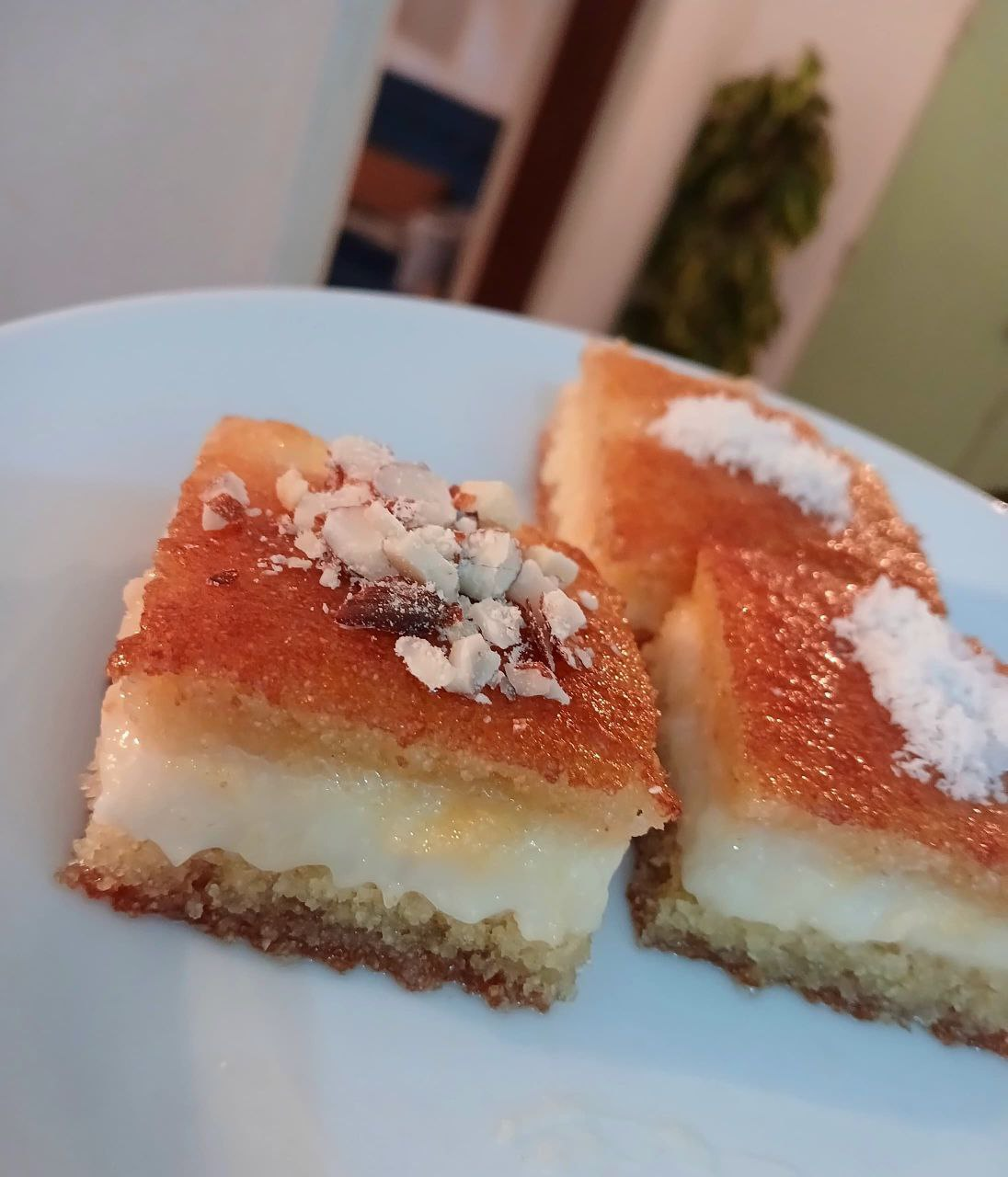
Cream-filled basbousa, Libya

Many variations of syrup-soaked semolina paste can be found in the Middle East; common ingredients include coconut, rose water, citrus, among many others.

Some denser versions also include eggs, modern versions include baking powder.

=== Middle east and North Africa ===
- Pastūsha (sometimes stylized as pastūçha) is a variant of basbousa that originated in Kuwait in the 2010s. Like basbousa, it is made from semolina soaked in sweet syrup. It is characterized by the addition of finely ground pistachios and orange flower water.
- Basbousa bil ashta: a Levantine and Egyptian variation of basbousa filled with qishta (milk clotted cream) in the middle.
- Basbousa eem tapuzim: Israeli variation from the coastal region, it is flavored with orange juice.
- Basbousa bil tamr: Libyan variant of basbousa where date spread is being added between two layers of the basbousa.
- Hareesa nabaqia (Levantine Arabic: الهريسة النبكية) originates from the city of Al-Nabek, Syria, and is coated in smen (clarified butter) and pistachios.
- Anise hareeseh (Arabic: هريسة يانسونية): Levantine anise flavored variation especially popular among Palestinians.
- Hilbeh: Palestinian variant of basbousa flavoured with fenugreek seeds.
- Tishpishti or tichpichtil is a Sephardic Jewish variant. The name derives from the Turkish phrase "Tez Pişti," meaning "cooked quickly."
- Kalb el louz is an Algerian semolina cake made with almond flour
- Qizha pie: Palestinian variant of basbousa flavored with nigella seeds paste called Qizha.

=== Southeast Europe ===
- Revani: Turkish variation, typically flavored with citrus juice.
- Shendetlie is an Albanian honey and walnut cake.
- Şambali: Similar to revani, made with syrup, yogurt and semolina, it is popular in Greece and İzmir.

== See also ==
- Arab cuisine
- Kalburabastı
- Melomakarono
