= Fahsa =

Yemen lamb dish

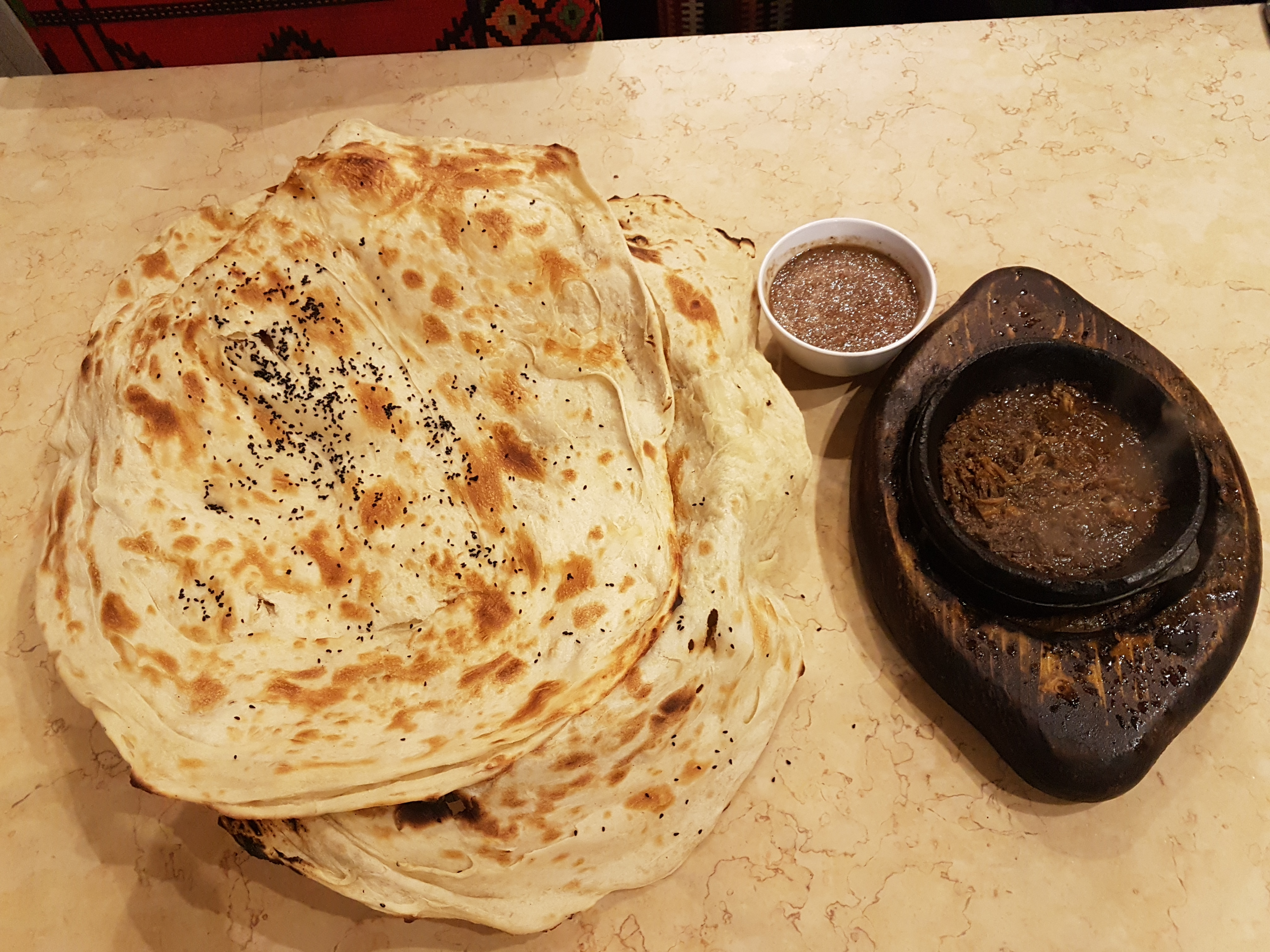
- Fahsa prepared in stony pot (madara) next to mulawah bread
- Type: Stew
- Region or state: Yemen
- Main ingredients: Lamb, herbs and spices

Fahsa (Arabic: فحسة, romanized: Fahsa) is a Yemeni stew. It is made of lamb cutlets with lamb broth. Spices and hilbah (a dip made with fenugreek) are added after cooking.

== See also ==
- List of lamb dishes
- List of stews
