= Qizha pie =

Palestinian nigella sativa semolina cake

Qizha / Nigella Cake
- Course: Dessert
- Place of origin: Nablus
- Main ingredients: Nigella Sativa seeds, semolina

Qizha (like Kiz-ha) is a Palestinian semolina cake. It is made from semolina flour flavored with qizha, a paste made from crushed Nigella sativa seeds. It is traditionally given to new mothers as it is believed to aid in milk production. It is a variation of hareesah.

== Other websites ==
- Qizha cake in BBC Travel website
