= Kharawar railway station =

Railway station in Haryana, India

Kharawar Railway Station

General information
- Location: Kharawar railway station India
- Coordinates: 28.8581714°N 76.6268394°E
- Elevation: 222 metres (728 ft)
- System: Indian Railway Station
- Owner: Indian Railways
- Operator: North Western Railway
- Line: Delhi–Rohtak line

Construction
- Structure type: Standard on ground

Other information
- Status: Functioning
Location
- Location within Haryana

Kharawar Railway Station is a station on the Delhi–Rohtak line. It is located in the Indian state of Haryana. It serves Kharawar and surrounding area.

Kharawar village has an ancient well built in the beginning of 13th century by the Banjara traders who used to trade on the Lahore-Hapur route, via Firozpur-Dabwali-Sirsa-Hansi-Rohtak-Bahadurgarh-Delhi, using the caravans of carts drawn by camels and horses. These traders use to buy kasuri methi fenugreek, red chilli and other spices from Lahore, and jaggery, khaandsari, and other goods from Hapur for trade.

== See also ==
- List of railway stations in Haryana
- Railway in Haryana
- Highways in Haryana

Preceding station	Indian Railways	Following station
