= Nadir Monji =

South Asian food item

Nadur Monji
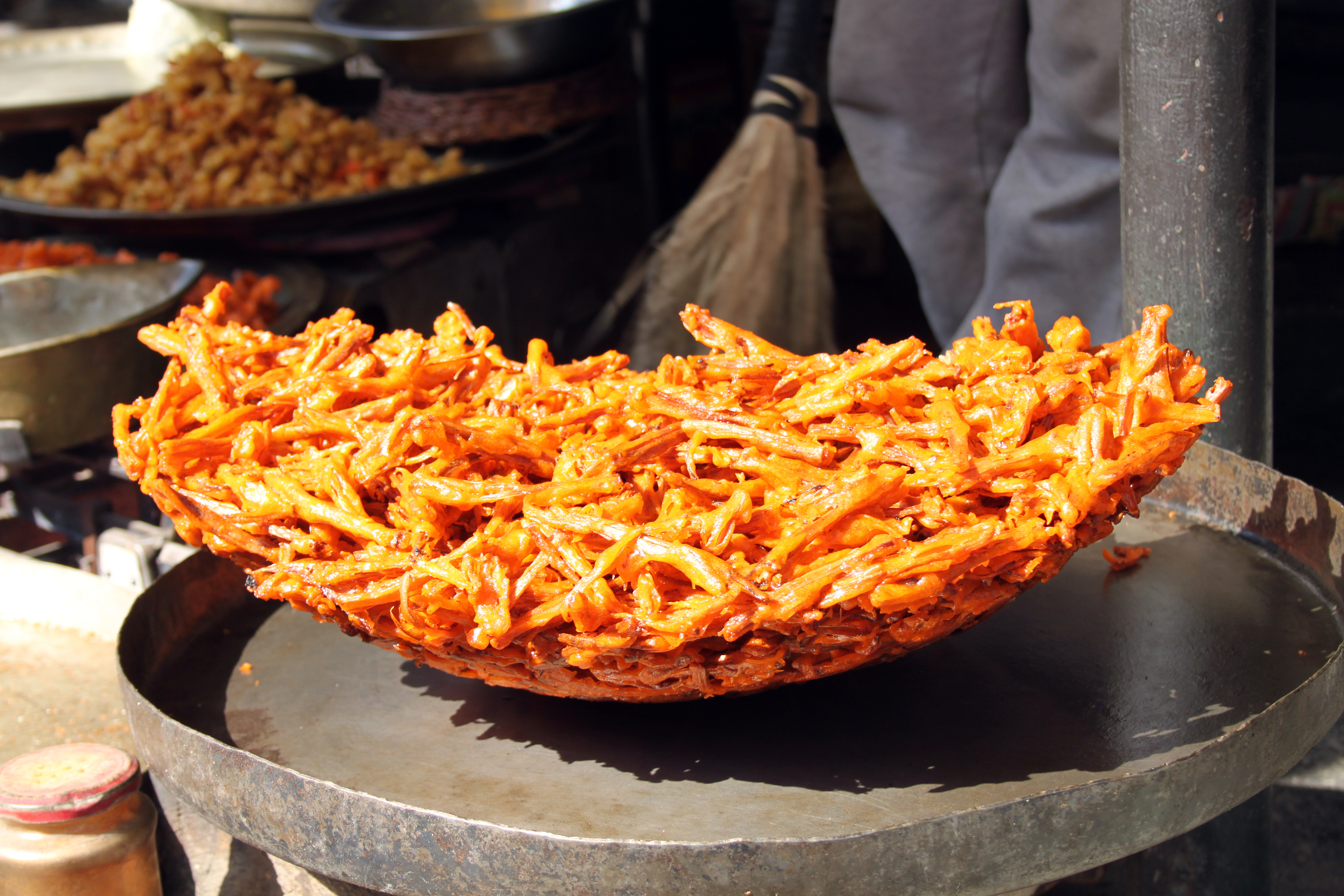
- Nadur Monji
- Type: Appetizer or snack
- Region or state: Kashmir
- Main ingredients: Lotus stem, Gram flour

Nadir monji (Kashmiri pronunciation: [nad̪ɨrʲ mɔnd͡ʒi]) is a fried snack (fritter) prepared from lotus stem and gram flour. Originating in Kashmir, it is found across South Asia.

== Preparation ==
The preparation of Nadur monji begins with one or two ingredients, such as lotus root, rice flour, salt, red chili powder, caraway seeds, thyme powder, cauliflower, cayenne pepper, chili pepper, or occasionally black cumin. Lotus roots are cut into long pieces and further cut into strips. Mixed with rice flour, salt, red chili powder, caraway seeds and thyme powder and is heated in a kadai. Fried till crisp and reddish-brown color and served hot with chutney.

== Serving ==
Nadur monji is usually served as snacks or appetizers. In Kashmir, they are popular as a street food and fast food snack.
