= KRZ =

KRZ or krz may refer to:

- Basango Mboliasa Airport, Mai-Ndombe Province, Democratic Republic of the Congo, IATA airport code KRZ
- Kerry Group, the Euronext code KRZ
- Kentucky Route Zero, a point-and-click adventure game
- Kharawar railway station, Haryana, India, Indian Railways station code KRZ
- Nggarna language, South Papua, Indonesia, ISO 639-3 code krz
