= Elwendia =

Scientific classification
- Kingdom: Plantae
- Clade: Tracheophytes
- Clade: Angiosperms
- Clade: Eudicots
- Clade: Asterids
- Order: Apiales
- Family: Apiaceae
- Genus: Elwendia; Boiss.

Genus of flowering plants

Elwendia is a genus of flowering plants belonging to the family Apiaceae.

Its native range is Turkey to Central Asia and Western Himalaya.

== Species ==
Species:

- Elwendia afghanica (Beauverd) Pimenov & Kljuykov
- Elwendia alata (Pimenov & Kljuykov) Pimenov & Kljuykov
- Elwendia angreni (Korovin) Pimenov & Kljuykov
- Elwendia badachschanica (Kamelin) Pimenov & Kljuykov
- Elwendia bucharica Kljuykov & Lyskov
- Elwendia cabulica (Bornm.) Pimenov & Kljuykov
- Elwendia capusii (Franch.) Pimenov & Kljuykov
- Elwendia caroides Boiss.
- Elwendia chaerophylloides (Regel & Schmalh.) Pimenov & Kljuykov
- Elwendia cylindrica (Boiss. & Hausskn.) Pimenov & Kljuykov
- Elwendia fedtschenkoana (Korovin ex Kamelin) Pimenov & Kljuykov
- Elwendia hissarica (Korovin) Pimenov & Kljuykov
- Elwendia intermedia (Korovin) Pimenov & Kljuykov
- Elwendia kopetdagensis (Geld.) Pimenov & Kljuykov
- Elwendia kuhitangi (Nevski) Pimenov & Kljuykov
- Elwendia latiloba (Korovin) Pimenov & Kljuykov
- Elwendia lindbergii (Rech.f. & Riedl) Pimenov & Kljuykov
- Elwendia longipes (Freyn) Pimenov & Kljuykov
- Elwendia persica (Boiss.) Pimenov & Kljuykov
- Elwendia salsa (Korovin) Pimenov & Kljuykov
- Elwendia sary-cheleki (Lazkov & Kljuykov) Pimenov & Kljuykov
- Elwendia seravschanica (Korovin) Pimenov & Kljuykov
- Elwendia setacea (Schrenk) Pimenov & Kljuykov
- Elwendia stewartiana (Nasir) Pimenov & Kljuykov
- Elwendia ugamica Kljuykov & Lyskov
- Elwendia vaginata (Korovin) Pimenov & Kljuykov
- Elwendia wolffii (Kljuykov) Pimenov & Kljuykov
