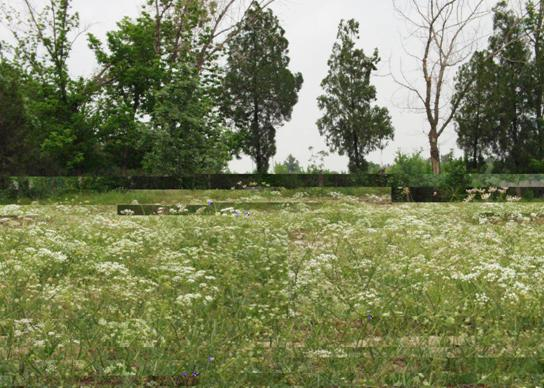
- A field of cultivated plants of Elwendia persica

Scientific classification
- Kingdom: Plantae
- Clade: Tracheophytes
- Clade: Angiosperms
- Clade: Eudicots
- Clade: Asterids
- Order: Apiales
- Family: Apiaceae
- Genus: Elwendia
- Species: E. persica

Binomial name
- Elwendia persica (Boiss.) Pimenov & Kljuykov

Synonyms
- Bunium persicum (Boiss.) B.Fedtsch.; Carum heterophyllum Regel & Schmalh.; Carum persicum Boiss.; Pimpinella cyminosma (Basiner) Koso-Pol.; Sium cyminosma Basiner

= Elwendia persica =

Species of flowering plant

Elwendia persica is a plant species in the family Apiaceae. It is related to cumin (Cuminum cyminum) and sometimes called black cumin, or black caraway, and has a smoky, earthy taste. It is often confused with Nigella sativa (which is also called black cumin, black caraway, or black seed), by which it is often substituted in cooking.

Dried E. persica fruits are used as a culinary spice in northern India, Pakistan, Bangladesh, Afghanistan, Tajikistan, and Iran. It is practically unknown outside these areas.

== Etymology ==
Local names for that spice are kala zeera (काला ज़ीरा; literally "black cumin") or shahi zeera (शाहि ज़ीरा; "imperial cumin") in Hindi, shahi jeera (শাহী জিরা, "imperial cumin") in Bengali, syah zirah (سیاہ زیرہ; "black cumin"), kaala zirah (کالا زیرہ; "black cumin"), and zirah kuhi (زيره كوهی; "mountain/wild cumin") in Urdu, zireh kuhi (زيره كوهی; "wild cumin") in Persian, and siyoh dona (сиёх дона; "black seed") in Tajiki, and in Malayalam sahajīrakaṁ (സഹജീരകം; literally "with cumin" or "co-cumin").

The commonly used Hindi term shahi zeera (शाहि ज़ीरा; literally "imperial cumin") may actually be a distortion of syahi ("black" in Persian) zeera. However, in the Hindustani language, the term syahi (स्याही) also means "inky black".

In Bengali, although kalo jeera (কালোজিরা) literally means 'black cumin', it actually refers not to E. persica, but to nigella seeds, which is widely used as a spice in Bengali cuisine.

== Uses ==
The plant bears slender, elongated, ribbed fruits which are harvested once the plant has become very dry. Not more than 5 to 8 g can be plucked from each plant, contributing to their high price.

The seeds are most valued as a garnish to high value, very special Indian dishes; they should not be ground, as their flavour would be reduced.

== Gallery ==
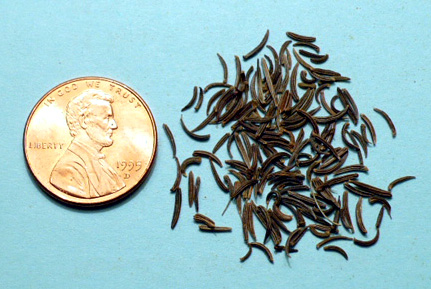
A pinch of the slender fruits juxtaposed with a one cent coin for scale

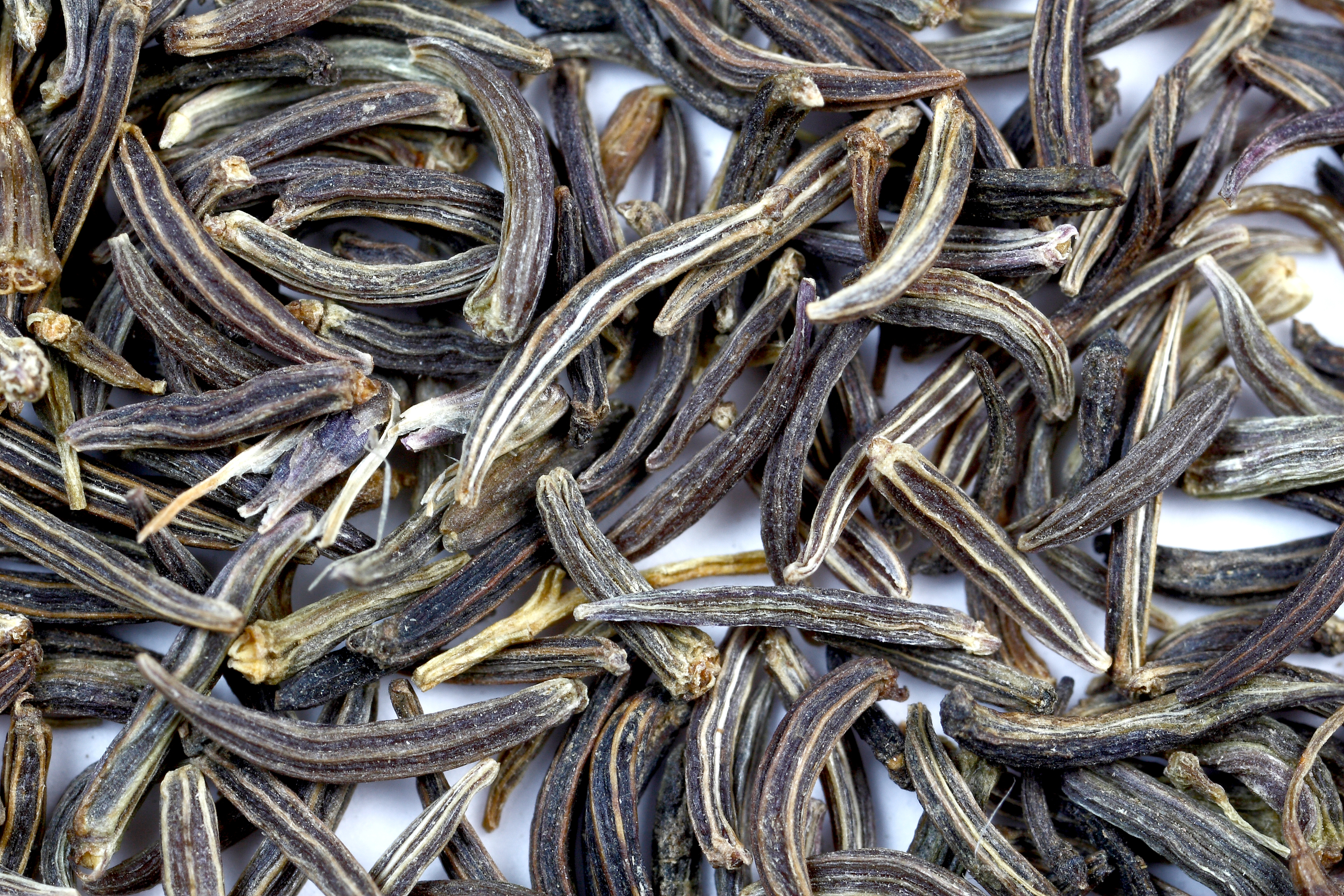
Close-up of slender seed-like fruits (mericarps)
