= Qizha =

Black seed paste in Palestinian cuisine

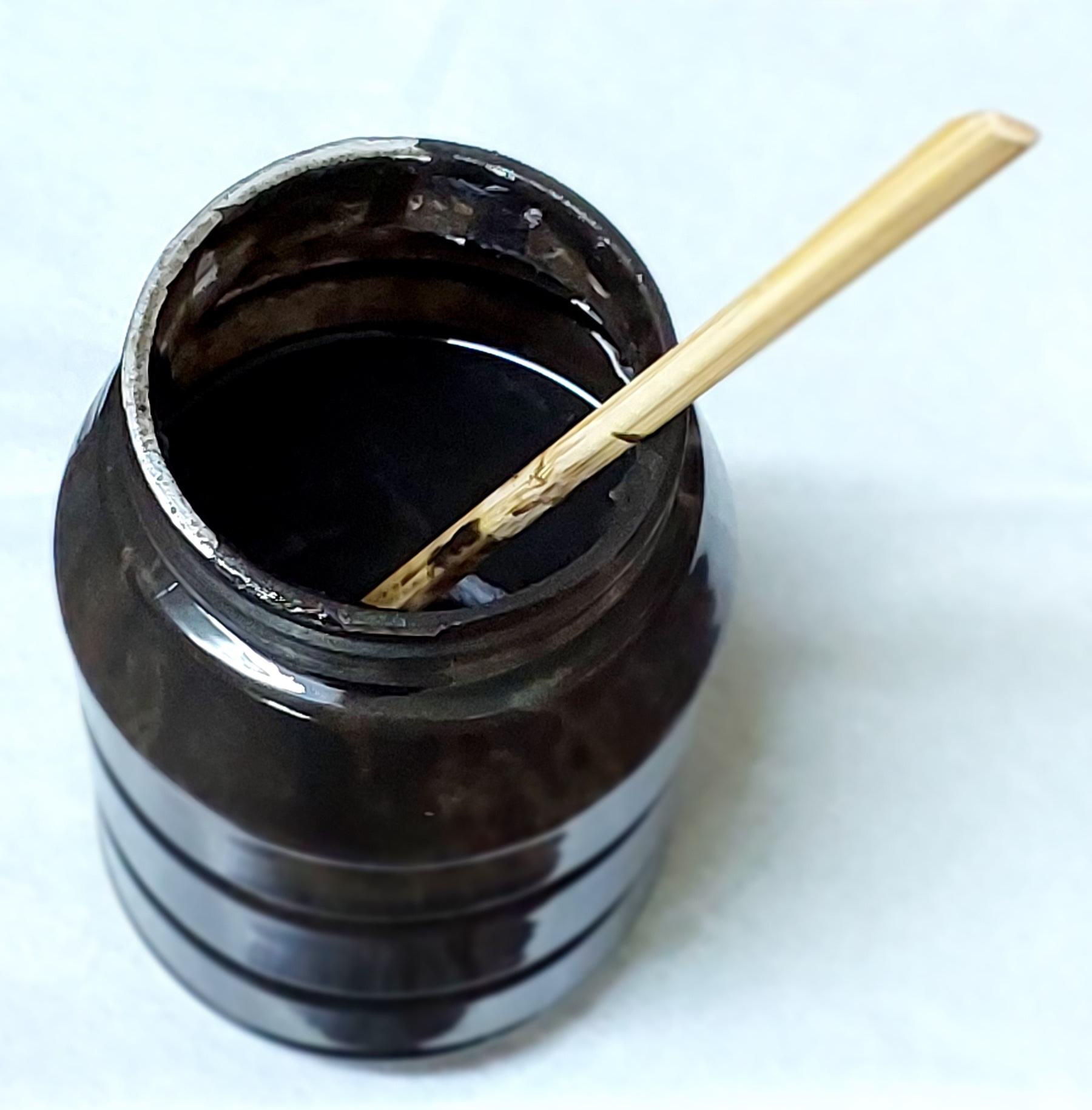
- A jar of qizha paste
- Alternative names: Black tahini
- Place of origin: Palestine
- Associated cuisine: Palestinian cuisine
- Main ingredients: Nigella sativa seeds

Qizha (Arabic: قزحة, romanized: qizḥa, pronounced ʼezḥa in Palestine) is a black seed paste used in Palestinian cuisine. Made from crushed nigella seeds, the paste has a sharp, bitter taste with slight tones of sweetness. The paste can be used with other condiments, such as tahini, or baked into pies, breads, and pastries.

== Name ==
The word Qizha can refer to the paste made from nigella seeds, or to the nigella plant itself.

The paste is also referred to as black tahini, not to be confused with the "black tahini" made from black sesame, which is referred to with that same name.

== Production ==
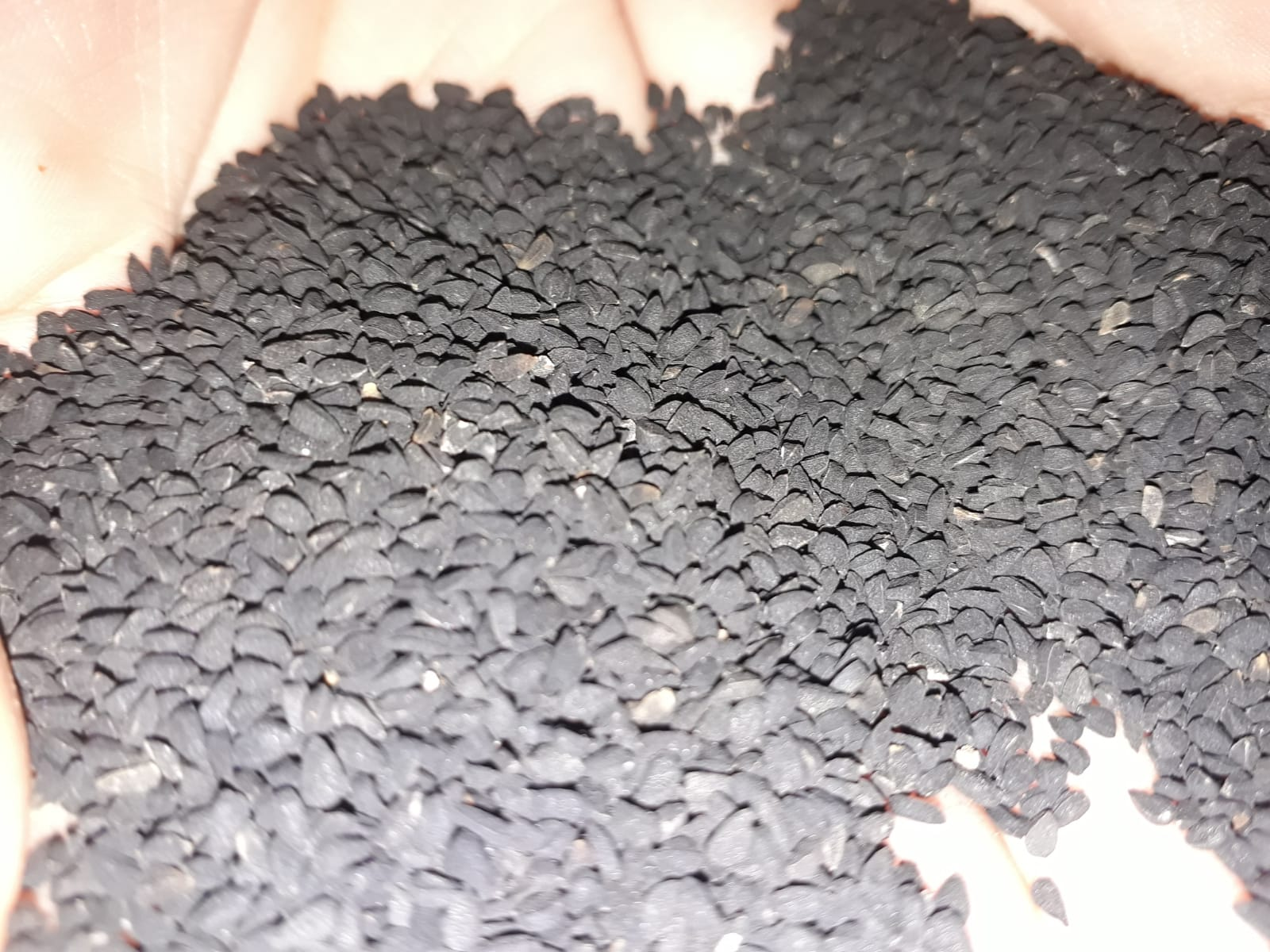
Seeds used to make Qizha

Qizha is made from the seeds of Nigella sativa of the buttercup family of plants, which is native to the Middle East and India. The seeds, sometimes known as "black cumin", are soaked in salt water for a night, oven roasted, left on rocks to dry in the sun, and finally ground to make a paste. Some sources consider the cities of Nablus and Jenin to be the source of the best-quality qizha.

According to Roads & Kingdoms, tahini factories in Nablus have been making qizha since at least the 1910s.

== Popularity ==
The popularity of Qizha is limited, this is attributed to its bitter taste and pitch black appearance; its appearance is often likened to "engine oil". It is sometimes described as "unique" to Palestinian cuisine.

Outside of Nablus, qizha and qizha pie are also traditionally made in Sidon, Lebanon. It is believed to have been popularized there through immigration from Nablus.

== Uses ==
=== Culinary ===
Qizha paste is used in creating sweets and pastries, like halwa, it may also be mixed with syrup and eaten as a spread like tahini.

It's also used to create a qizha pie, which is a semolina cake topped with sugar syrup and nuts, the pie is a variation of basbousa.

=== Traditional medicine ===
A spoonful of Qizha is sometimes consumed by the elderly as a traditional remedy for a variety of ailments.
