= Fenugreek production in India =

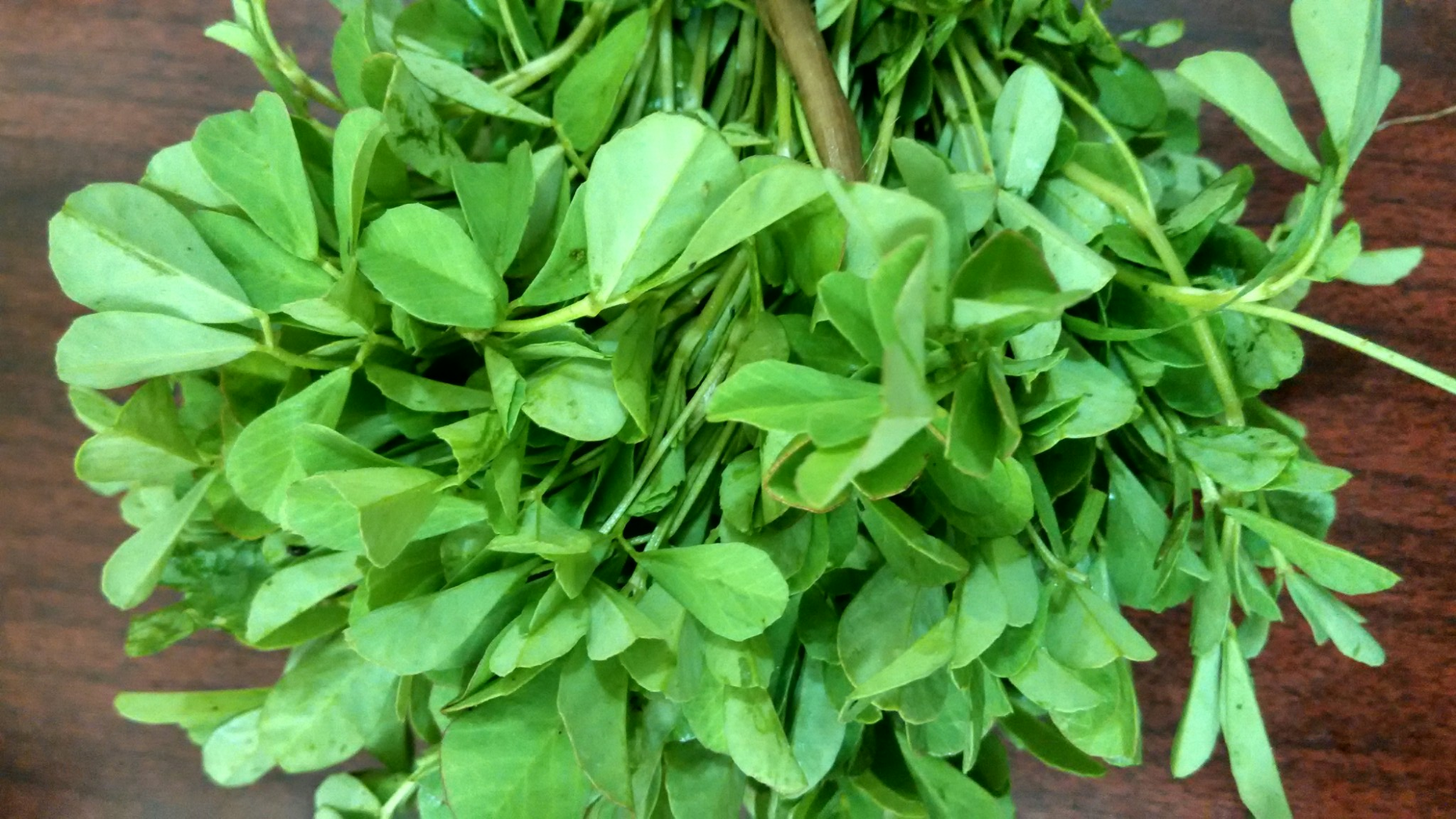
Fenugreek (Trigonella foenum-graecum) leaves

The production of fenugreek in India is marked by its dominant position in world production and export. Within India Rajasthan accounts for its largest cropped area and production. The fenugreek plant is an annual herbaceous forage legume with aroma, which is used for food in the form of its seeds as spices, and its leaves as a vegetable. It is also used as a medicinal herb in several Ayurvedic formulations for treatment of dry skin, boils, hair loss and so forth.

== Names ==
Fenugreek's botanical name is Trigonella foenum-graecum in the subfamily Fabaceae (also called the Papilioacae), of the family Leguminosae.

In the languages of India, it is known by terms derived from Proto-Dravidian mentti: examples include Indo-European forms like Hindustani मेथी-میتھی methī and Dravidian forms like Tamil: வெந்தயம், romanized: ventayam and Tulu: ಮೆತ್ತೆ, romanized: tele.

== History ==
It is believed that fenugreek was known in the Indian cuisine even 3,000 years ago. Its growth in the wild is reported from Kashmir, Punjab and the Upper Gangetic plains Its use is also reported in ancient Egypt and India, and later in Greece and Rome. A notable practice reported is its use as fumigant in incense burning in religious ceremonies in Egypt to spread "Holy Smoke". It was also used for embalming. Other countries where it is grown are Argentina, Egypt and Mediterranean region. Use of its seed as a spice, and its leaves and tender pods as vegetables were also reported. It was also used as cattle feed.

== Description ==
Fenugreek is an annual herb growing to a height of up to 60 cm (20 in). The leaves are pale green and consist of three leaflets with toothed margins. The whitish flowers are produced singly or in pairs in April and May. They are followed by bean-like pods 10 to 15 cm (4 to 6 in) long containing up to twenty small, grooved, yellowish-brown seeds. The leaves are rich in the nutrients carotene, vitamin A, ascorbic acid, calcium, and iron. The seeds are composed of "protein, starch, sugar, mucilage, minerals, volatile oil, fixed oil, vitamins and enzymes". They smell of curry but are quite bitter and contain coumarin oil. The seeds also contain diosgenin which is used in the manufacture of oral contraceptives.

== Production ==
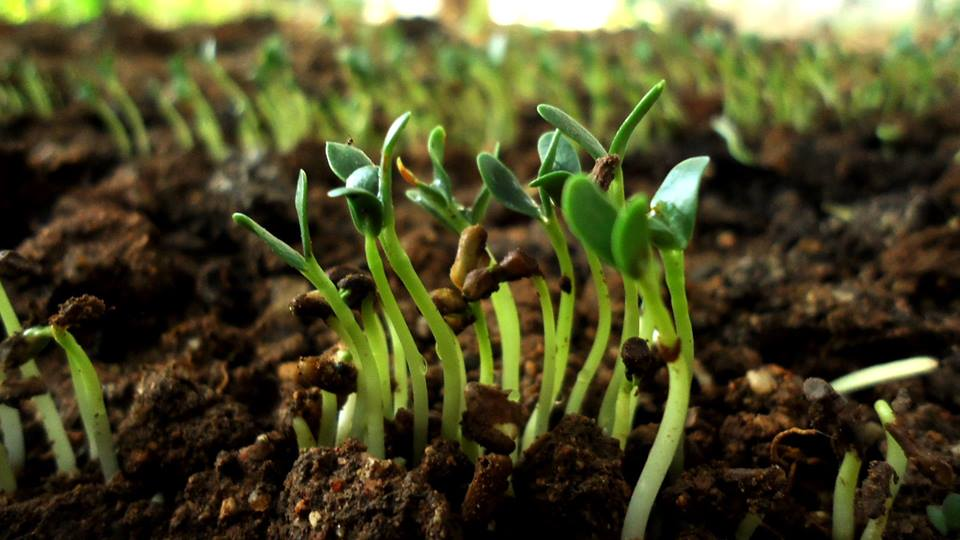
Fenugreek sprouts

India is the largest producer of fenugreek in the world. During 2011–12, production was 121,775 tonnes of seeds from an area of 96,304 hectares (237,970 acres). Its seed is traded as a spice, and in an oil extract form as oleoresin. India consumes most of the seeds. Its export was 799 tonnes in 1960–61, and increased greatly to 15,135 tons by 1995–96 and then to 21,800 tonnes during 2011–12. It was exported to UAE, Sri Lanka, and Japan, and European countries of UK, Netherlands, Germany and France.

Within the country its seed production is the highest in the state of Rajasthan followed by Gujarat, Madhya Pradesh and Uttarakhand. In Rajasthan, which accounts for a significant majority of India's total output, the crop is mainly grown during the winter season. Other states where it is grown in fairly good quantity are Tamil Nadu, the Punjab, and Uttar Pradesh. There are several varieties of fenugreek grown in the country.

== Cultivation method ==
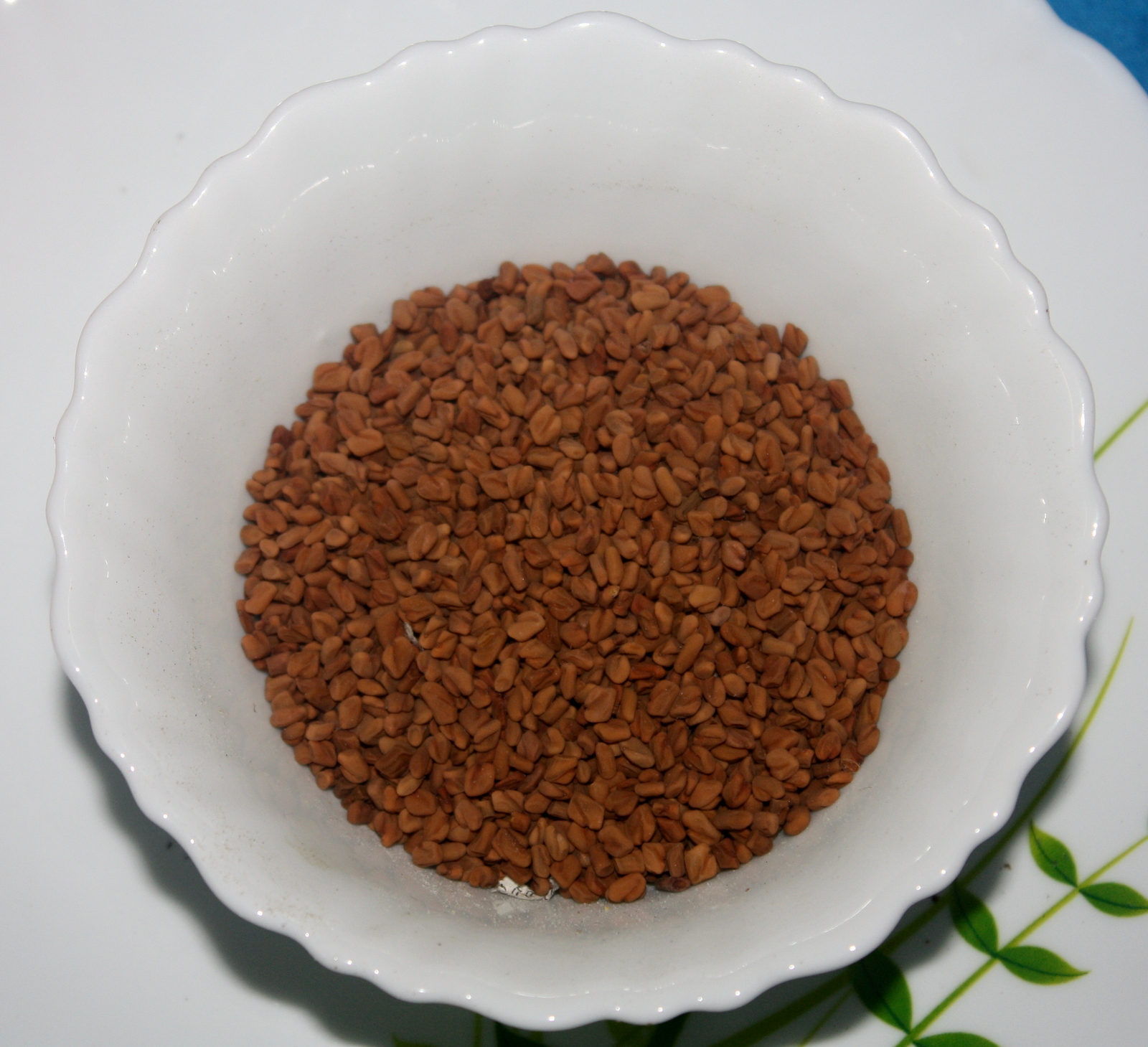
Fenugreek seeds

The plant is generally cultivated throughout the year in areas where the climate is moderately cool, and frost free (particularly during the stage of the plant's "flowering and early grain formation") with clear sky. It is grown in many types of soils which have rich organic content. The preferred soil type is loamy or sandy loam with pH value in the range of 6–7 and with good drainage conditions for better yield.

In North India, the sowing season is from the last week of October to the first week of November. It is grown in both the cropping seasons of Rabi and Kharif in South India – first fortnight of October during Rabi and second fortnight of June–July during Kharif. The amount of seeds used for sowing during both seasons is generally 25 kg/ha. The yield is more during Rabi season. The average yield is about 10–11 q/ha with 15–20 q/ha achievable with improved varieties and optimal management methods.

Prior to sowing, the seeds are subject to Rhizobium culture. Seeds are planted preferably in flat beds in rows 30 cm apart and spaced at 10 cm, and in depths of less than 5 cm. Farm yard manure or compost is used to enhance the fertility of the fields before sowing, say at 15 to 20 tons per ha. While sowing, chemicals added are 50 kg N/ha and 40 kg P205/ha, depending on the inherent fertility values of the soil which can be ascertained by testing the soil. Irrigation water is provided immediately after sowing and then after 30, 70–75, 85–90, and 105–110 days; good drainage is facilitated to prevent any water-logging. Other cultivation methods of hoeing and weeding are done as required. Harvesting is done when the lower leaves of the plant start shedding and the pods turn colour. Timely manual harvesting is done by way of cutting using sickles. The harvested plants are tied in bundles and dried for 5–7 days. Threshing, by hand or using mechanical methods, is done to separate the seeds from the plants. A vacuum gravity separator or spiral gravity separator is used to clean the seeds which are then graded. Disinfected jute bags are used to store the graded seeds and they are kept in moisture-free and airy chambers.

== Uses ==
Fenugreek's seed or pulse is used as a spice and its leaves used as a herb, and also as an admixture in condiments and to flavour food. Its pods and leaves are used as vegetables, as the leaves are rich in protein, minerals and Vitamin C.

In North India and Punjab, fresh fenugreek leaf is used in culinary dishes. In its dried form it is used like any other spice. Seed is also sprouted and used. Various health benefits are claimed for fenugreek.

== Bibliography ==
- Chapman, Pat (1 March 2009). India Food and Cooking: The Ultimate Book on Indian Cuisine. New Holland Publishers. ISBN 978-1-84537-619-2.
- Nybe, E. V. (15 January 2007). Spices. New India Publishing. ISBN 978-81-89422-44-8.
- Parthasarathy, V. A.; Chempakam, Bhageerathy (2008). Chemistry of Spices. CABI. ISBN 978-1-84593-420-0.
- Fotopoulos, Christos V. (2003). "Marketing". In Georgios A. Petropoulos (ed.). Fenugreek: The Genus Trigonella. Medicinal and Aromatic Plants – Industrial Profiles. CRC Press. pp. 183–195. ISBN 978-0-203-21747-4.
- Petropoulos, Georgios A. (2003), Georgios A. Petropoulos (ed.), Fenugreek: The Genus Trigonella, Medicinal and Aromatic Plants – Industrial Profiles, CRC Press, ISBN 978-0-203-21747-4
