= Arto Der Haroutunian =

British-Armenian cook

Arto Der Haroutunian (Armenian: Արտո Տեր-Հարությունյան, 1940–1987) was a celebrated British Armenian cook, artist, translator and writer.

== Early life ==
Arto Der Haroutunian was born in 1940 in Aleppo, Syria to Armenian parents. His father, a survivor of the Armenian genocide, was from the predominantly Armenian-populated region of Cilicia within the Ottoman Empire.

In 1952, the Der Haroutunian family settled in the north west of England where his father was head of the Armenian Apostolic Church. Arto qualified as an architect, having studied at Manchester University. He established his career designing restaurants, clubs and hotels.

The Der Haroutunian family moved to Beirut, Lebanon for a few years before in 1952 settling in Manchester in North West England when his father was sent as a priest to the Armenian Church there. Their home was the rectory attached to the church. When 18 Arto went to Manchester University to study architecture. There he met his future wife Frances who was studying geography. They married in 1967 and Arto qualified as an architect and set up his own practice in 1970. In 1976 their son Raffi was born.

Food played a major role in the family's life although it was a terrific shock when they first arrived in grey and austere Britain from colourful and plentiful Lebanon to find many of the fruits and vegetables they were used to were very difficult if not impossible to find. Arto's mother was a fantastic cook and the rectory was an open house for any Armenian students and visitors in Manchester. Hospitality was always guaranteed and it was nothing for 12 or more people to sit down for Sunday lunch after the church service.

== Restaurateur ==
Arto and his brother Koko, a civil engineer, felt that the 'traditional' Greek-Cypriot food served to the public in Britain at that time was a poor reflection of the true Middle Eastern cuisine and they decided to open a genuine Armenian restaurant in Manchester. In 1970 he opened an Armenian restaurant in Manchester with his brother Koko. This developed into a successful chain of restaurants and hotels.

It opened in 1969. Designed by Arto its simple modern style and rich colours was in stark contrast to that of most of the ethnic eating places of the time. It was a style for which he became well-known and his architectural practise came to specialise in hotel, club and restaurant design including ones in Manchester and Leeds for the Mario and Franco chain. To begin with family and friends were roped in to help run the restaurant. Arto's mother and wife worked in the kitchen while the brothers took charge of front of house. Later his cousins came to help. The restaurant became a tremendous success and led to the opening of a second Armenian restaurant in London. This became a magnet for food writers like Elizabeth David, visiting performers like jazz pianist Oscar Peterson and Soviet poet Yevgeny Yevtushenko and the Middle East writer David Marshall Lang. It was also a meeting place for a large number of Armenians, both local and visiting, all looking for good food, company and conversation for example the singer Charles Aznavour, writer William Saroyan, actor Kevork Malikyan and conductors and composers Loris Tjeknavorian and Aram Khatchaturian the latter acting as godfather to Arto's son Raffi.

Over the following years the brothers opened four more restaurants, two hotels and a night club. After thirteen years of producing mainly Middle Eastern food it was a natural progression that he should then begin to write cookery books as they combined his love of food with his great interest in the history and culture of the region. It was his belief that the rich culinary tradition of the Middle East is the main source of many of our western cuisines and his books were intended as an introduction to that tradition.

== Writing ==
It was a natural progression that he should then begin to write on Middle Eastern food. The cookery books combined his love of food with his great interest in the history and culture of the whole region. He wrote twelve cookery books in total, several of which were translated into foreign languages. He also contributed articles to many magazines and TV and radio shows. His books are mini-histories of peoples and cultures. The recipes are interspersed with historical facts, proverbs, folk wisdoms, poems and anecdotes. Each book is a good read and acts as a taster for the various regions communicating the flavour of life and the philosophy behind the preparing and eating of traditional foods while at the same time encouraging the reader to try the food either at home or in a restaurant. He also contributed articles on food to many magazines.

In addition to his own writing he also translated Turkish, Arab, Persian and Armenian authors.

== Art ==
Arto started painting in 1963 after being goaded into it by an artist friend. He converted the coal cellars of the rectory into a studio and within six months had produced seventy paintings. The first article about his art appeared in 1965 in "The Idiom" an arts magazine produced at the University. At the time he was having his first one-man exhibition at the Manchester Central Library and it was transferred to the Student's Union afterwards.

Without the "benefits" of a formal art school training his paintings possess an individuality which is entirely his own. Over the years Arto succeeded in fusing his two backgrounds of East and West into a new and personal style. He was a master of line and colour. His architectural training is evident in the linear aspect of his works. His pictures are full of sinuous lines which flow across the canvasses creating shapes, spaces and depths without much recourse to perspective so showing the influence of ancient Armenian manuscripts. Primarily though he was a colourist and he has said "I am from a warm country. Colours are brighter in the Middle East because of the sun. I don't have theories about colour, I follow instinct. My colour has modified though – it has been toned down by the British weather!"

Arto exhibited both in the north and south of England as well as abroad. Along the way he struck up friendships with fellow northern artists Colin Jelicoe, Geoffrey Key, John Picking and Emanuel Levy. His works are in several private collections in Britain and abroad as well as in galleries in Armenia, Syria, Lebanon and Nigeria.

Each painting can be distinguished by his distinctive signature which combines his first name in English and Armenian. Arto was devoted to Armenia, its people and its heritage and he visited his Armenian homeland for the first time in 1978 when he was invited to attend the 2nd International Symposium on Armenian Art where he was a guest speaker and presented a lecture on the Armenian Castle of Azqit. On his return he wrote a book of poems "From the Future to the Past" in response to that highly emotional visit. The poems tell of his thoughts and experiences before, during and after his visit.

Arto's first love was music, but owing to family and financial pressures he studied architecture instead. However, shortly before he died he had started to attend music composition classes at the Northern College of Music in the little spare time he had.

== Death ==
Der Haroutunian died of a sudden heart attack in 1987 at the age of 47. He is survived by his wife Frances, their son and grandson.

== Selected publications ==
- Haroutunian, Arto der (2021). North African Cookery. Casemate Publishers. ISBN 978-1-908117-90-8.
- Haroutunian, Arto der (2025). Complete Arab Cookery. Grub Street Cookery. ISBN 978-1-911714-58-3.
