= Şambali =

Dessert

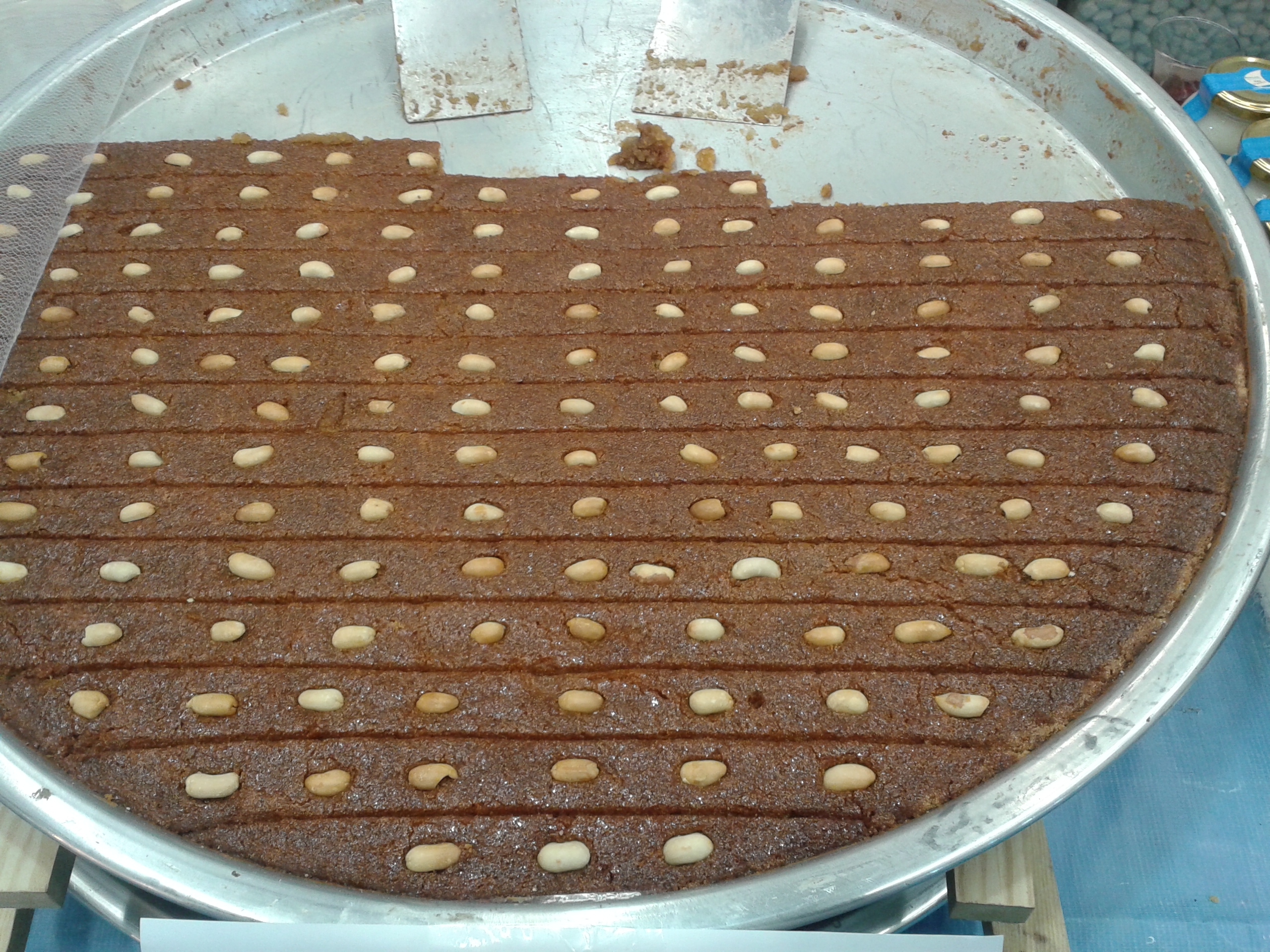
- Type: Dessert
- Place of origin: Syria
- Serving temperature: Cold
- Main ingredients: Semolina, yogurt, syrup
- Food energy (per serving): Calorie rich

Şambali or Shambali is a famous dessert originating from Syria that traveled to İzmir, Turkey. Şambali comes from Turkish Şam balı which means Sham (Syrian) honey. It is known as Şambaba in Istanbul. Şambali is widely sold at street corners and street vendors in İzmir. Şambali is a firmer and more intense dessert than revani, another favorite Turkish delicacy. Its main ingredients are semolina, sugar and yogurt or milk.
