= Hulbah =

Condiment made from ground fenugreek seeds

Hilbah
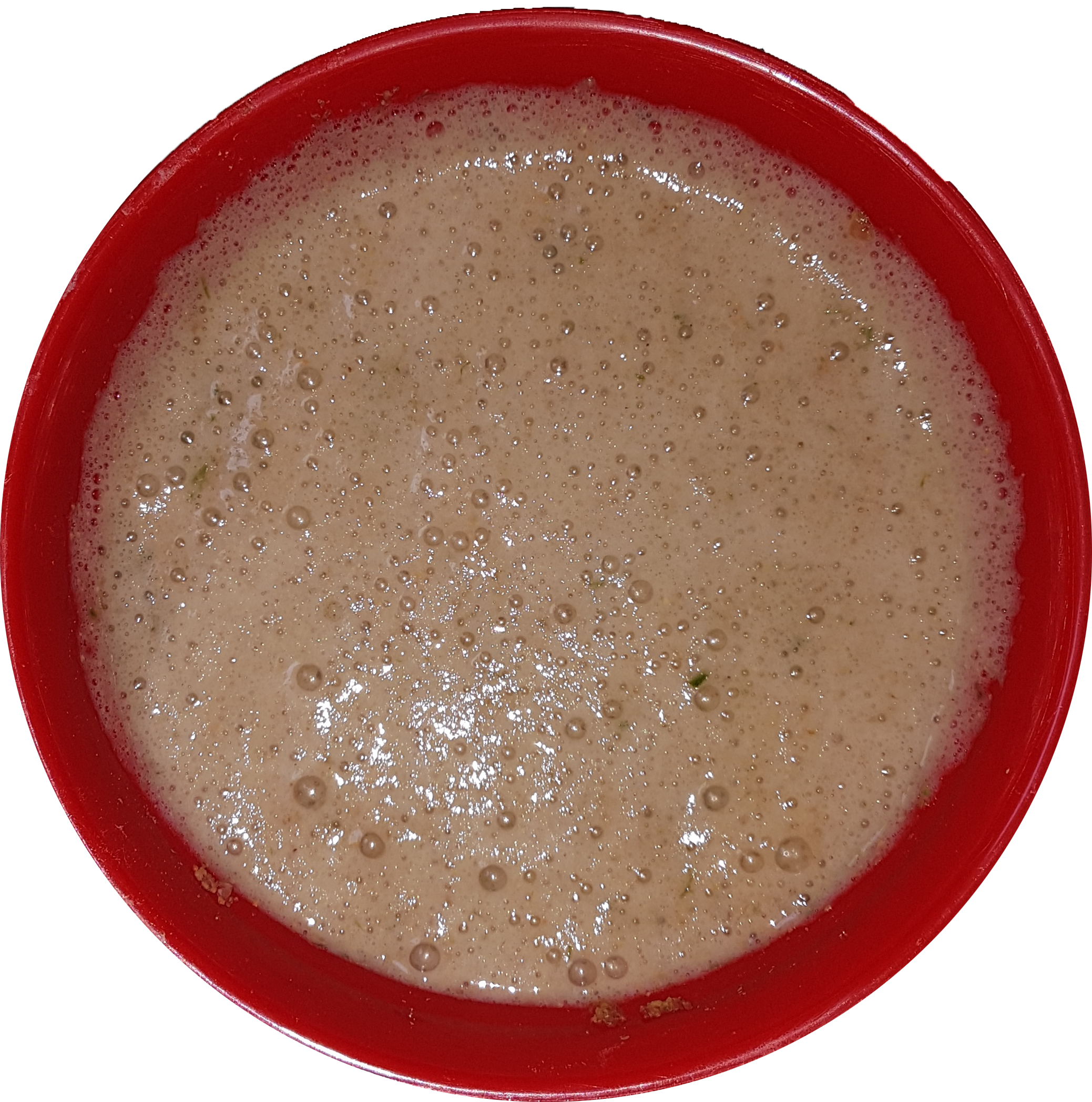
- Place of origin: Yemen
- Main ingredients: fenugreek seeds, water, Leek, salt, Citric acid

Hilbeh (Arabic: حلبة) is a condiment made from ground fenugreek seeds. A traditional Yemeni food, now popularized among other cultures as well, especially by Yemenite Jews in Israel, who have introduced it to other ethnic groups. Hulbah greatly expands when added to water. When whisked in a bowl, it takes on a light, frothy texture. It is consumed almost every day domestically in Yemen, and can be eaten by itself or added to saltah and fahsa. A dollop of hulbah is often dished out of the larger batch and added to hot soup.
