= Black cumin =

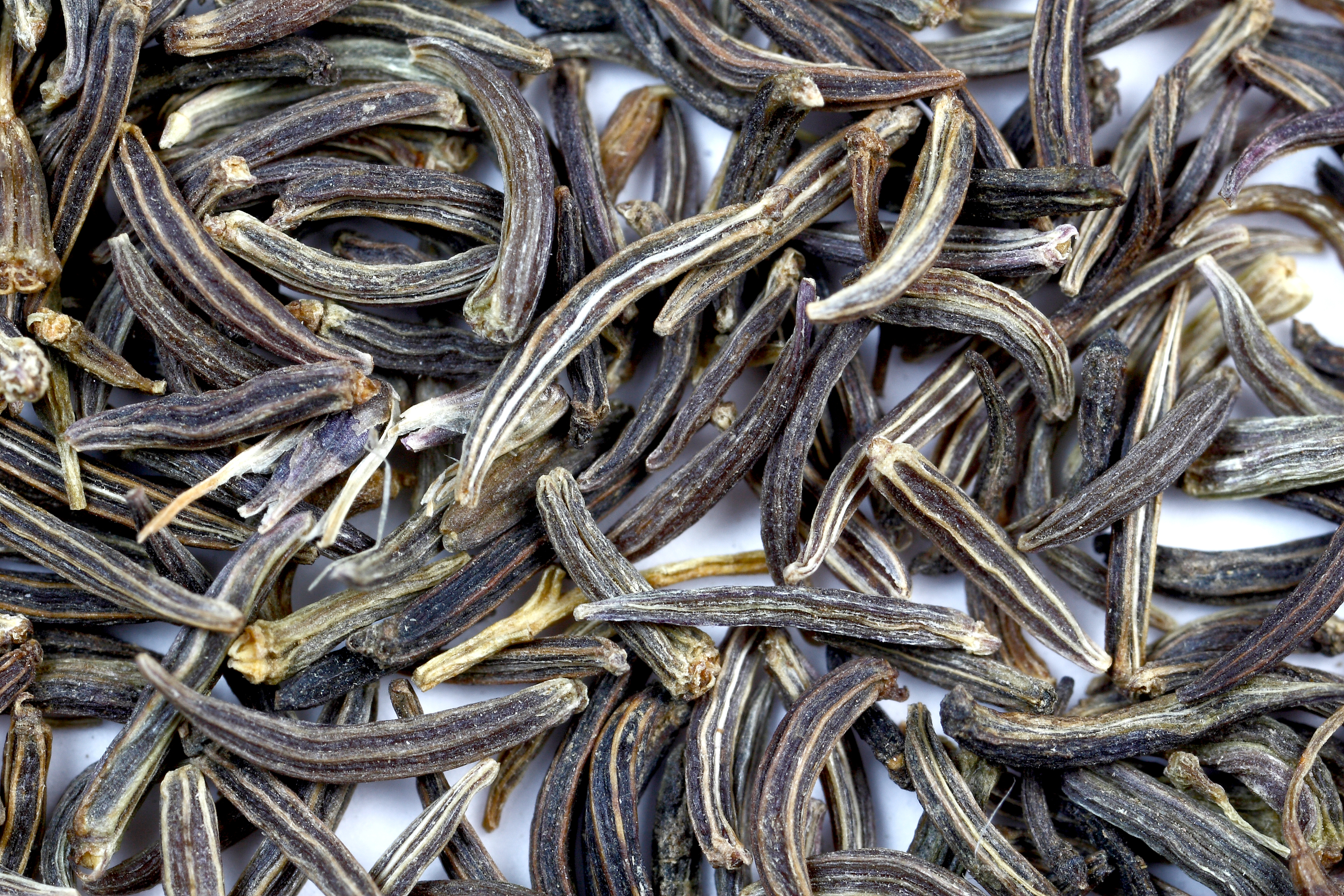
Elwendia persica

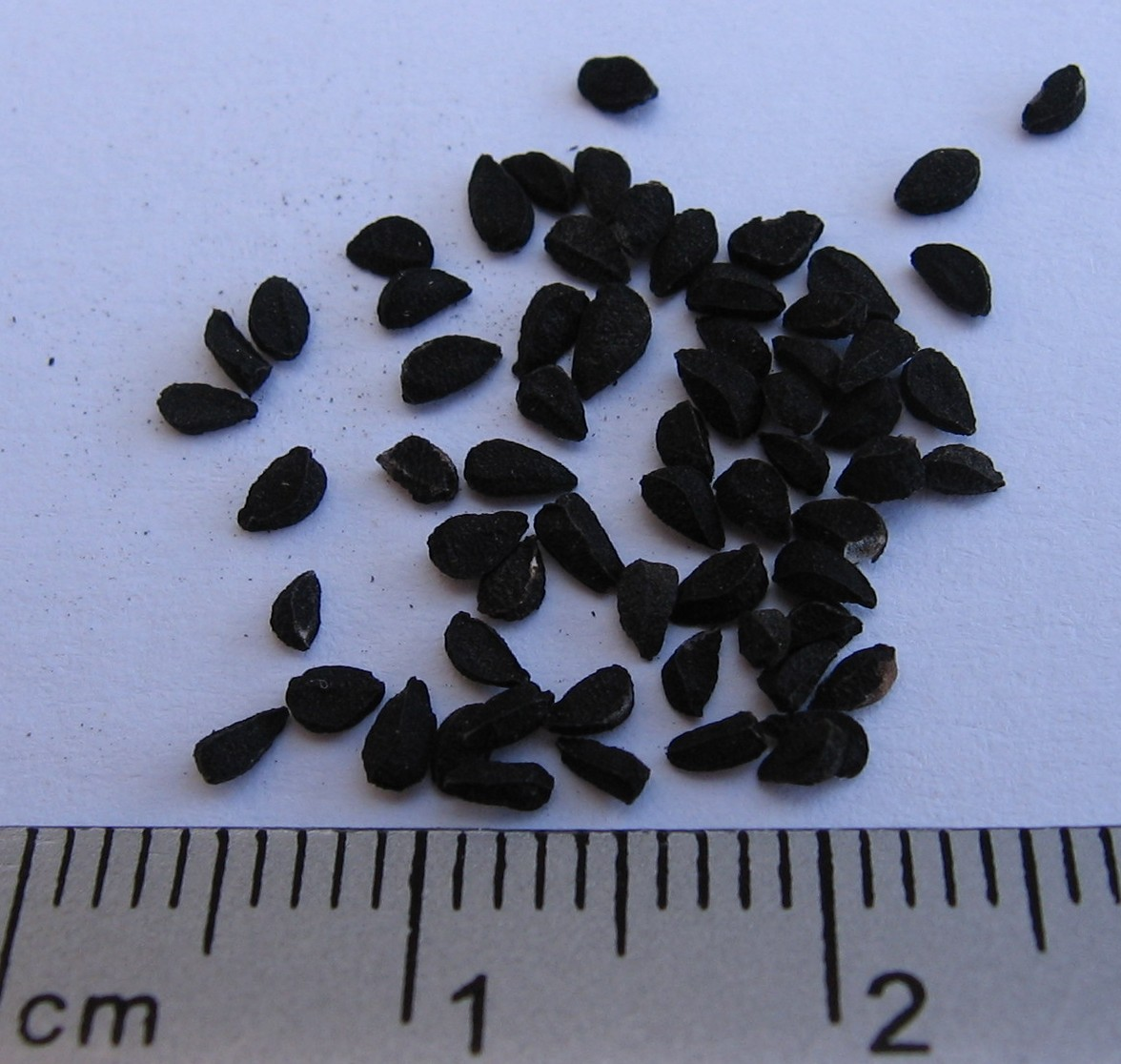
Nigella sativa

Black cumin can refer to the seeds of either of two quite different plants, both of which are used as spices:

- Elwendia persica, black cumin is considered similar to caraway, but they are two distinctly different plants. The seeds differ dramatically in shape, color, and size. Caraway seeds appear brown in color, while Black Cumin is mostly black with a slight curve shape. This seed may be used in rice water to bring a slight flavor to the rice.
- Nigella sativa, black caraway is also called kalonji or nigella, and more common in Asia and Africa. The seeds vary in shape, are pure dark black, with no other visible colors. This seed is used at the beginning of Indian Subcontinent cuisine to flavor the oil, onions, other spices, meats and vegetables.
