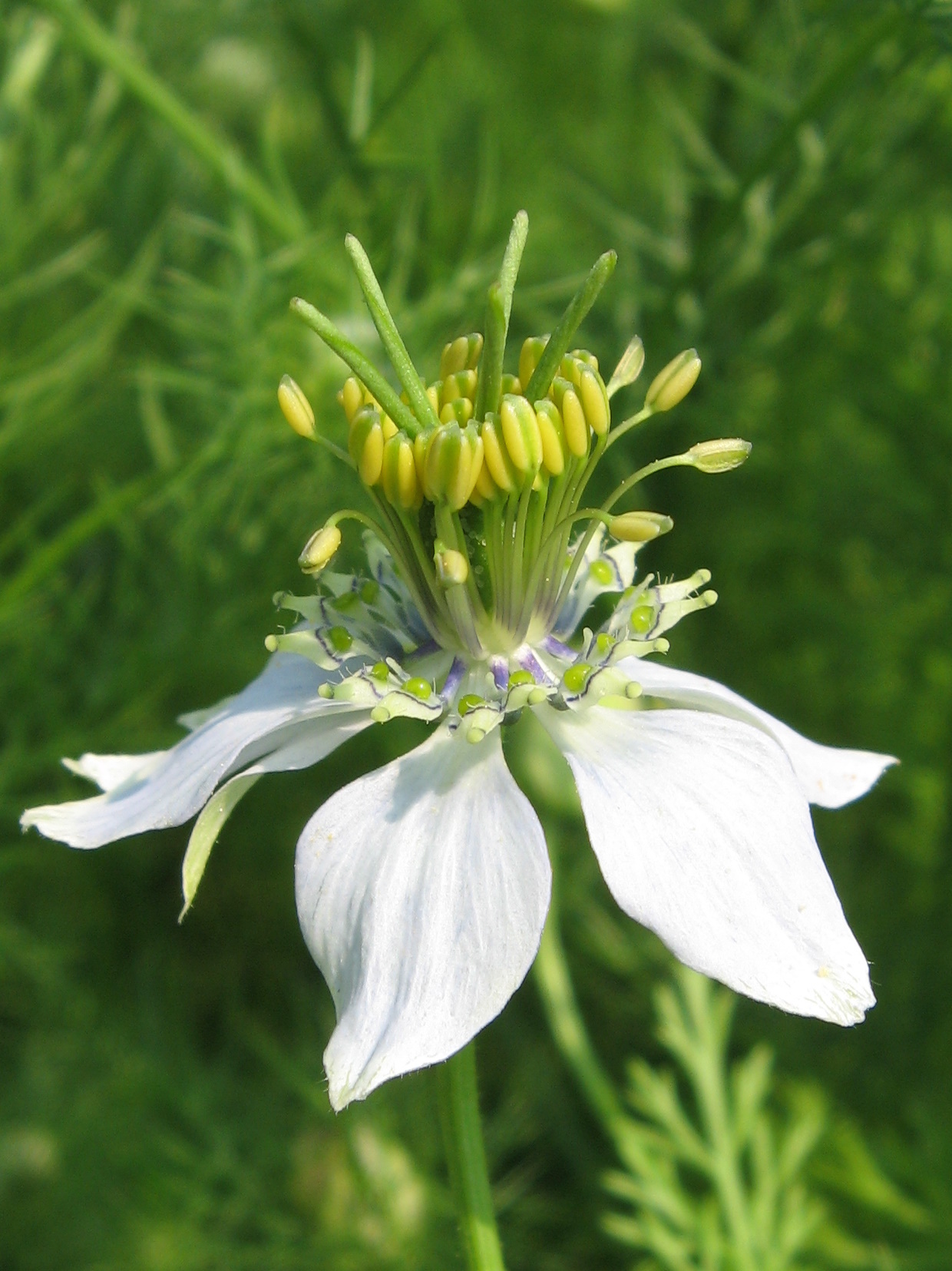

Scientific classification
- Kingdom: Plantae
- Clade: Tracheophytes
- Clade: Angiosperms
- Clade: Eudicots
- Order: Ranunculales
- Family: Ranunculaceae
- Genus: Nigella
- Species: N. sativa

Binomial name
- Nigella sativa L.

Synonyms
- Nigella cretica Mill.; Nigella indica Roxb.; Nigella truncata Viv.

= Nigella sativa =

Species of flowering plant in the buttercup family

Nigella sativa (common names, black caraway, black cumin, nigella, charnushka, or kalonji) is an annual flowering plant in the family Ranunculaceae, native to western Asia (the Levant, Cyprus, Turkey, Iran and Iraq), and eastern Europe (Bulgaria and Romania). It is used as a spice in various food preparations.

It is naturalised over parts of Europe, North Africa, and east to Myanmar.

== Etymology ==
The genus name Nigella is a diminutive of the Latin niger "black", referring to the colour of the seeds. The specific epithet sativa means "cultivated".

== Common names ==
In food preparation, Nigella sativa and its seeds are variously called black caraway, black seed, black cumin, charnushka, fennel flower, nigella, nutmeg flower, Roman coriander, or black onion seed.

Black seed and black caraway may also refer to Elwendia persica, which is also known as Bunium persicum.

== Origin and distribution ==
N. sativa is native to a region from eastern Europe (Bulgaria and Romania) to West Asia. It has been introduced for cultivation across Europe, Russia, India, and North Africa.

== Description ==
N. sativa grows to 20–30 cm (7.9–11.8 in) tall, with finely divided, linear (but not thread-like) leaves. The flowers are delicate, and usually pale blue and white, with five to ten petals. The fruit is a large and inflated capsule composed of three to seven united follicles, each containing numerous seeds which are used as spice, sometimes as a replacement for Bunium bulbocastanum (also called black cumin).

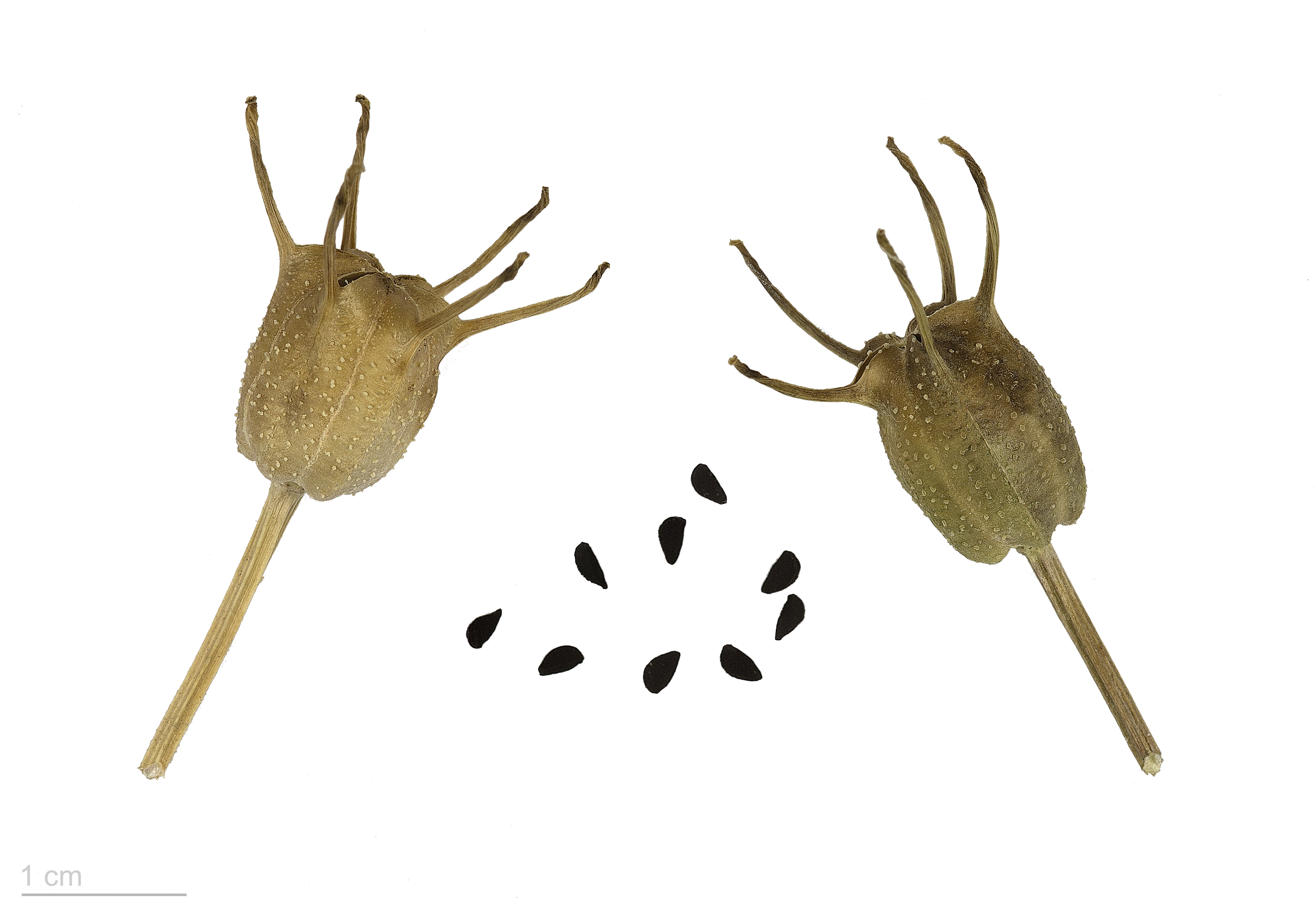
Fruits

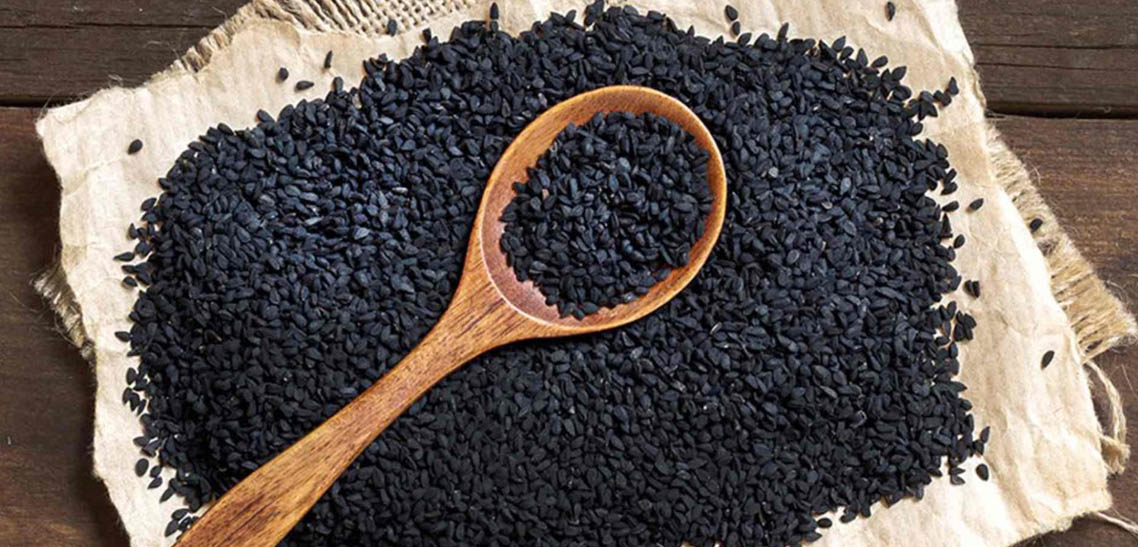
Seeds

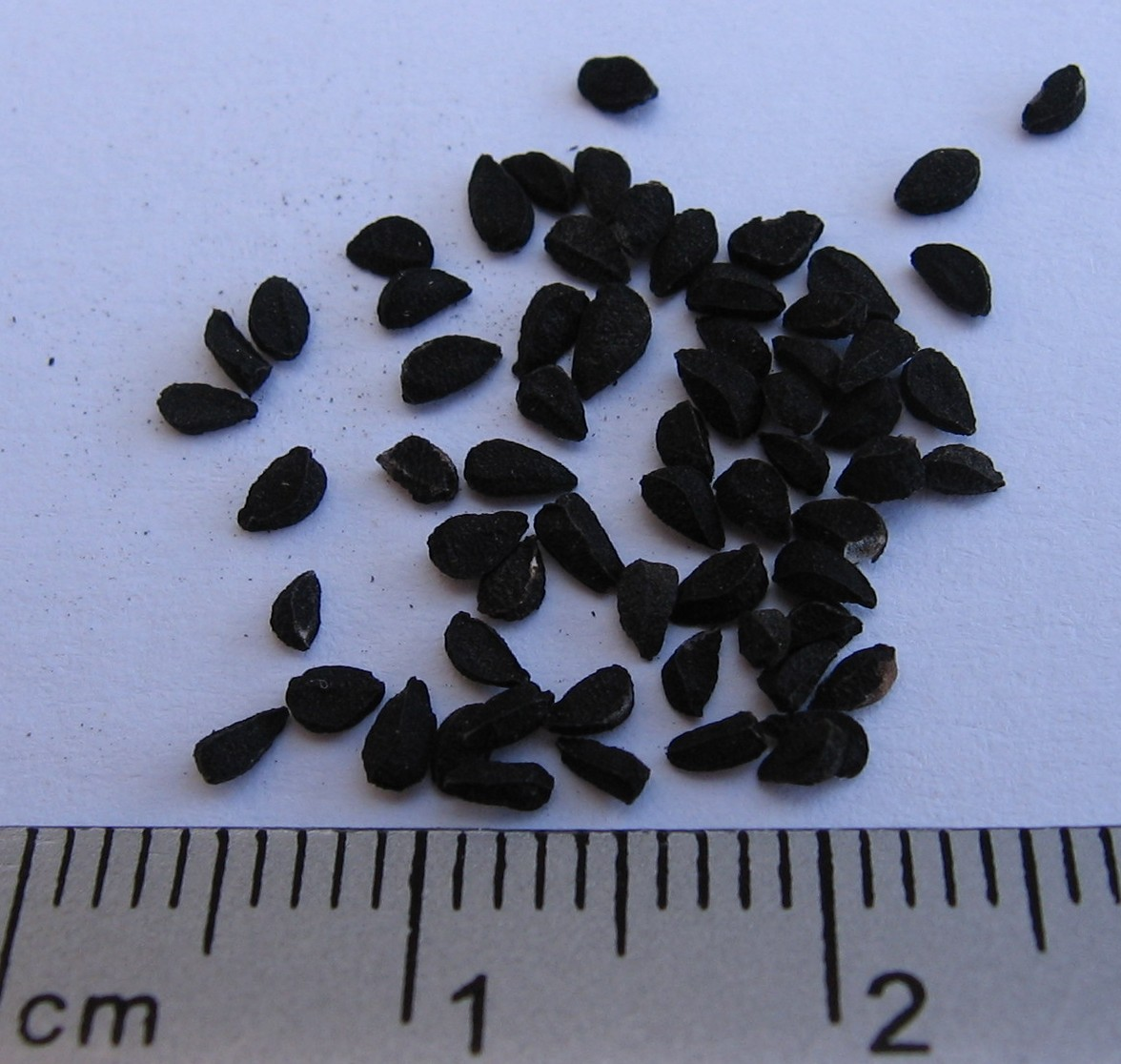
Close-up of the seeds

== Culinary uses ==
The seeds of N. sativa are used as a spice in many cuisines. In Palestine, the seeds are ground to make bitter qizha paste.

The dry-roasted seeds season curries, vegetables, and pulses. They can be used as a seasoning in recipes with pod fruit, vegetables, salads, and poultry. In some cultures, the black seeds are used to season bread products. They are used as a part of the spice mixture panch phoron (meaning a mixture of five spices) in many recipes in Bengali cuisine, and are most recognisable in some variations of naan, such as nân-e barbari. Nigella is also used in tresse cheese, a braided string cheese called majdouleh or majdouli in the Lebanon.

In the United States, the Food and Drug Administration classifies Nigella sativa as Generally Recognized as Safe (GRAS) for use as a spice, natural seasoning, or flavoring.

== History ==
Archaeological evidence of the cultivation of N. sativa dates back three millennia, with N. sativa seeds found in several sites from ancient Egypt, including the Tomb of Tutankhamun. Seeds were found in a Hittite flask in Turkey from the second millennium BC.

N. sativa may have been used as a condiment of the Old World to season food. The Persian physician Avicenna described N. sativa as a treatment for dyspnea in his The Canon of Medicine. N. sativa was used Western Asia as a traditional medicine.

== Chemistry ==
Oils are 32% to 40% of the total composition of N. sativa seeds. N. sativa oil contains linoleic acid, oleic acid, palmitic acid, and trans-anethole, and other minor constituents, such as nigellicine, nigellidine, nigellimine, and nigellimine N-oxide. Aromatics include thymoquinone, dihydrothymoquinone, p-cymene, carvacrol, α-thujene, thymol, α-pinene, β-pinene and trans-anethole. Protein and various alkaloids are present in the seeds.

== Folk medicine ==
Despite considerable use of N. sativa in folk medicine practices in Africa and Asia, there is insufficient high-quality clinical evidence to indicate that consuming the seeds or oil can be used to treat human diseases. One meta-analysis of clinical trials found weak evidence that N. sativa has a short-term benefit on lowering systolic and diastolic blood pressure. A 2016 review indicated that N. sativa supplementation may lower total cholesterol, LDL, and triglyceride levels.

== See also ==
- Nigella damascena (love-in-a-mist)
