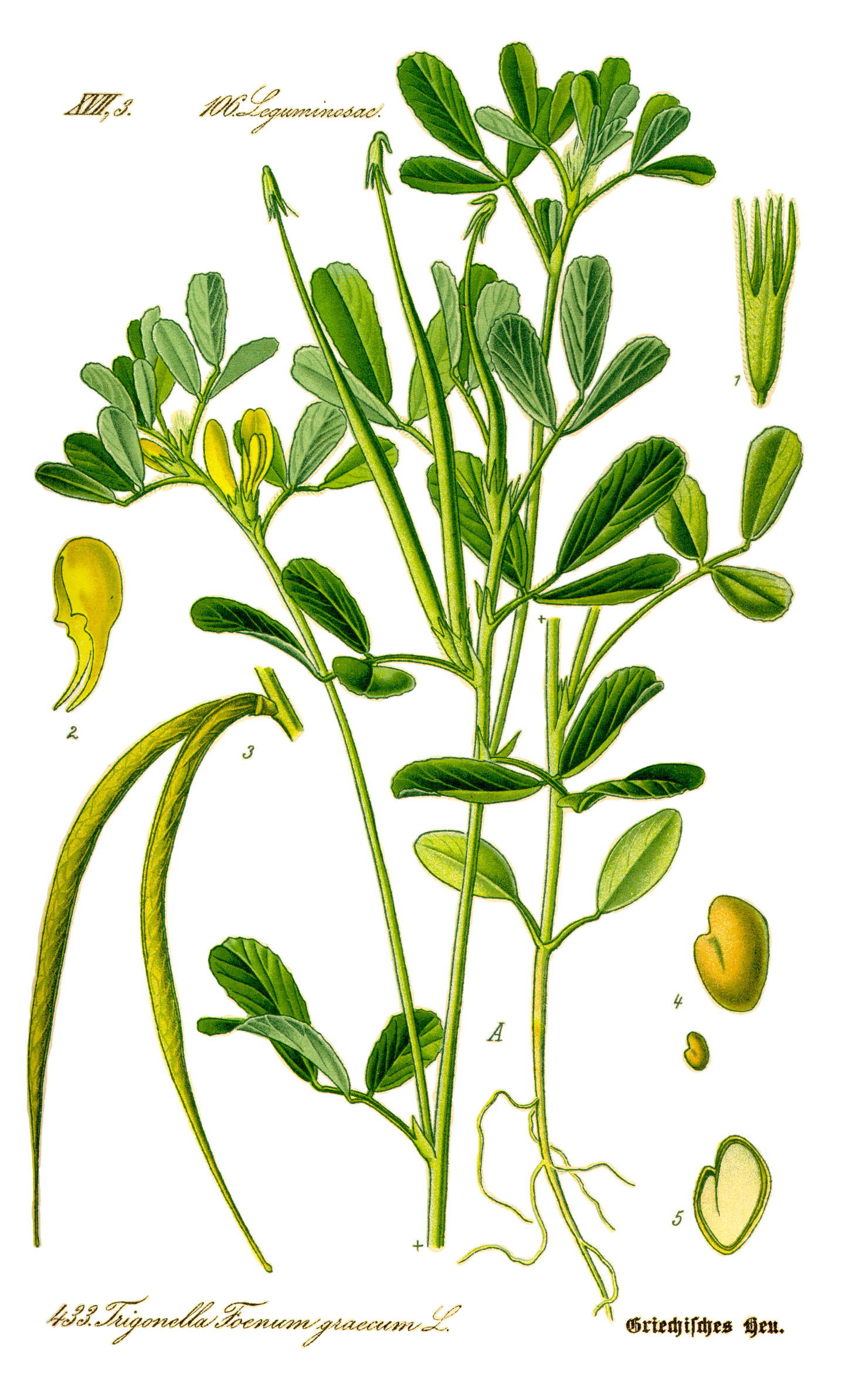

Scientific classification
- Kingdom: Plantae
- Clade: Tracheophytes
- Clade: Angiosperms
- Clade: Eudicots
- Clade: Rosids
- Order: Fabales
- Family: Fabaceae
- Subfamily: Faboideae
- Genus: Trigonella
- Species: T. foenum-graecum

Binomial name
- Trigonella foenum-graecum L.

= Fenugreek =

Species of flowering plant

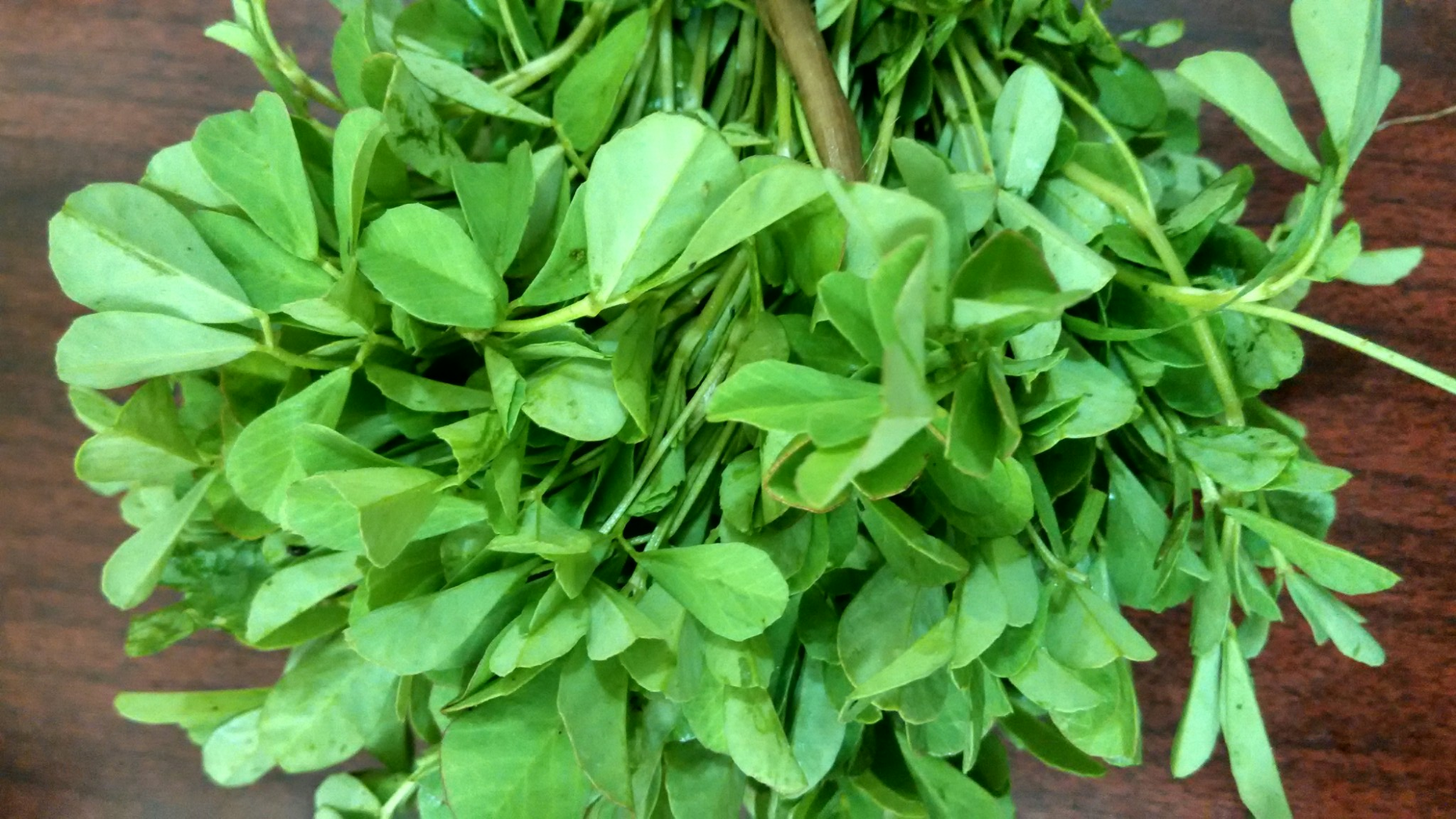
Fenugreek greens

Fenugreek (/ˈfɛnjʊɡriːk/; Trigonella foenum-graecum) is an annual plant in the family Fabaceae, which includes beans, peas, and peanuts. It is distinguished by its three small obovate to oblong shaped leaflets.

Most likely originating in the Near East, fenugreek is cultivated worldwide as a semiarid crop. Its leaves and seeds have been used as a culinary ingredient since ancient times, and are common ingredients in dishes from the Indian subcontinent. Its use as a food ingredient in small quantities is safe.

Although a common dietary supplement, no significant clinical evidence suggests that fenugreek has therapeutic properties. Commonly used in traditional medicine, fenugreek can increase the risk of serious adverse effects, including allergic reactions.

== History ==
Fenugreek is believed to have been brought into cultivation in the Near East; it is uncertain which wild strain of the genus Trigonella gave rise to domesticated fenugreek. Charred fenugreek seeds have been recovered from Tell Halal, Iraq (carbon dated to 4000 BC), Bronze Age levels of Lachish, and desiccated seeds from the tomb of Tutankhamun. Cato the Elder lists fenugreek with clover and vetch as crops grown to feed cattle.

In one first-century AD recipe, the Romans flavoured wine with fenugreek. In the first century AD, in Galilee, it was grown as a staple food, as Josephus mentions in his book, the Wars of the Jews. The plant is mentioned in the second-century compendium of Jewish Oral Law (Mishnah) under its Hebrew name tiltan.

== Etymology ==
The English name derives via Middle French fenugrec from Latin faenugraecum, faenum Graecum meaning "Greek hay".

== Production ==
India is the world's largest producer of fenugreek, with over 80% of its output coming from the state of Rajasthan.

== Uses ==
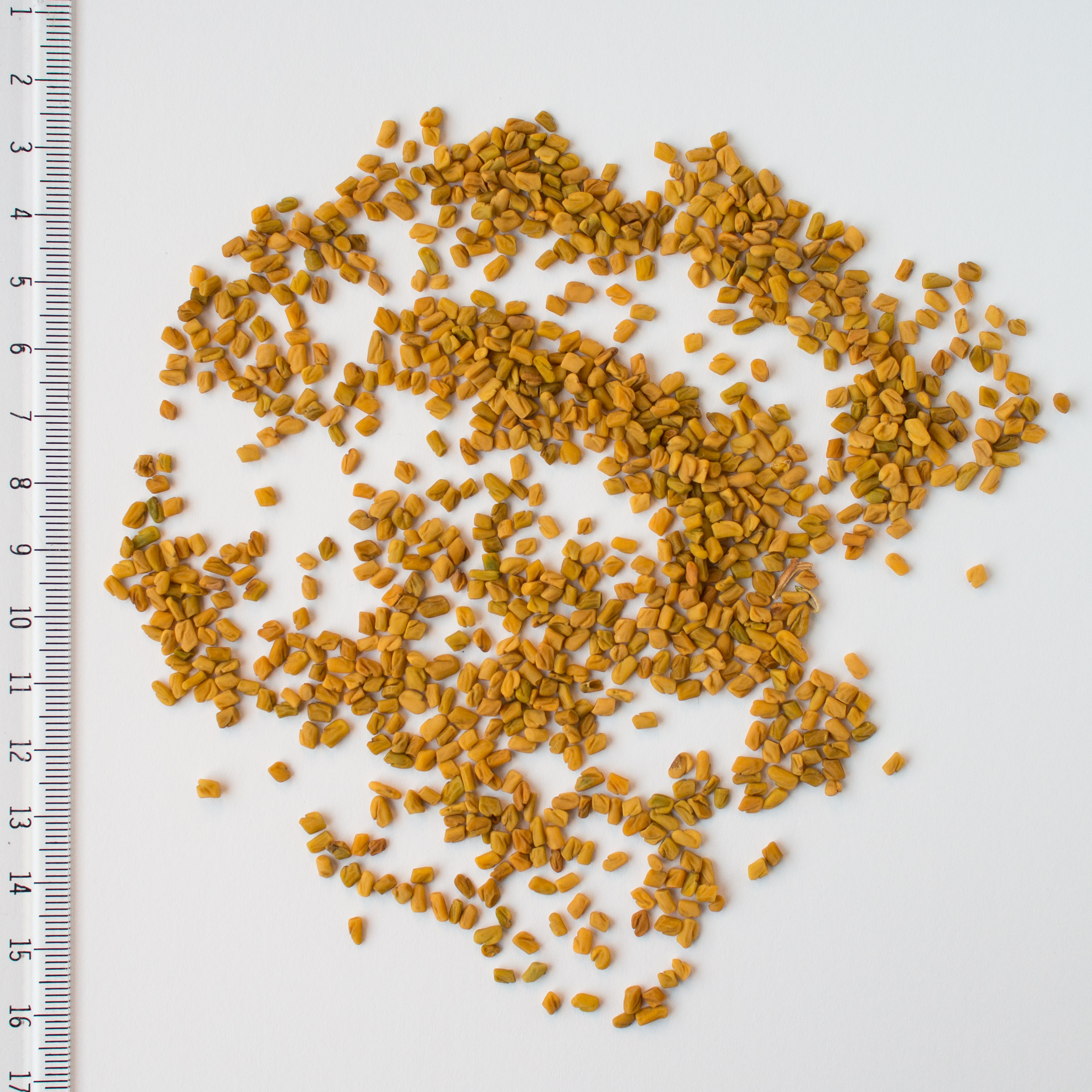
Fenugreek seeds

Fenugreek is used as a herb (dried or fresh leaves), spice (seeds), and vegetable (fresh leaves, sprouts, and microgreens). Sotolon is the chemical responsible for the distinctive maple syrup smell of fenugreek.

Cuboid, yellow- to amber-coloured fenugreek seeds are frequently encountered in the cuisines of the Indian subcontinent. Whether whole or powdered, fenugreek seed is used in the preparation of pickles, vegetable dishes, dal, and spice mixes such as panch phoron and sambar powder. The seeds are often roasted whole before grinding, to reduce their inherent bitterness and enhance flavour (Maillard browning).

=== Cooking ===
Fresh fenugreek leaves are an ingredient in some curries, such as with potatoes in Indian cuisines to make aloo methi (potato fenugreek) curry.

In Armenian cuisine, fenugreek seed powder is used to make a paste that is an important ingredient to cover dried and cured beef to make basturma.

In Iranian cuisine, fenugreek leaves are called shambalileh. They are one of several greens incorporated into the herb stew ghormeh sabzi, the herb frittata kuku sabzi, and the soup eshkeneh.

In Georgian cuisine, a related species—Trigonella caerulea, called "blue fenugreek"—is used.

In Egyptian cuisine, fenugreek is known by the Arabic name hilba or helba حلبة. Seeds are boiled to make a drink that is consumed at home and in coffee shops. Fellah in Upper Egypt add fenugreek seeds and maize to their pita bread to produce aish merahrah, a staple of their diet. Basterma, a cured, dried beef, gets its distinctive flavour from the fenugreek used as a coating.

In the same way in Turkish cuisine, fenugreek seed powder, called çemen, is used to make a paste with paprika powder and garlic to cover dried and cured beef in making pastirma/basturma. (Its name comes from the Turkish verb bastırmak, meaning "to press").

In Palestinian cuisine, fenugreek is used as an ingredient in a cake called fenugreek cake or hilbeh.

In Moroccan cuisine, fenugreek is used in rfissa, a dish associated with the countryside.

Fenugreek is used in Eritrean and Ethiopian cuisines. The word for fenugreek in Amharic is abesh (or abish), and the seed is used in Ethiopia as a natural herbal medicine in the treatment of diabetes.

Yemenite Jews following the interpretation of Rabbi Shelomo Yitzchak (Rashi) believe fenugreek, which they call hilbah, hilbeh, hilba, helba, or halba "חילבה", to be the Talmudic rubia. When the seed kernels are ground and mixed with water, they greatly expand; hot spices, turmeric, and lemon juice are added to produce a frothy relish eaten with a sop. The relish is reminiscent of curry. It is eaten daily and ceremonially during the meal of the first and/or second night of the Jewish New Year, Rosh Hashana.

In Yemen, a small amount of oud al hilba (عود الحلبة), which appears to be the same as ashwagandha, is traditionally added to ground fenugreek seeds before they are mixed with water to prepare the hulbah paste. This is believed to aid in digestion and more importantly to prevent or lessen the maple-syrup smell that usually occurs when consuming fenugreek.

=== Nutritional profile ===
Fenugreek seed
Nutritional value per 100 g (3.5 oz)
- Energy: 1,352 kJ (323 kcal)
- Carbohydrates: 58 g
- Dietary fiber: 25 g
- Fat: 6.4 g
- Protein: 23 g
Vitamins and minerals
Vitamins	Quantity %DV^{†}
Thiamine (B1)	27% 0.322 mg
Riboflavin (B2)	28% 0.366 mg
Niacin (B3)	10% 1.64 mg
Vitamin B6	35% 0.6 mg
Folate (B9)	14% 57 μg
Vitamin C	3% 3 mg
Minerals	Quantity %DV^{†}
Calcium	14% 176 mg
Iron	189% 34 mg
Magnesium	45% 191 mg
Manganese	53% 1.23 mg
Phosphorus	24% 296 mg
Potassium	26% 770 mg
Sodium	3% 67 mg
Zinc	23% 2.5 mg
- Other constituents: Quantity
- Water: 8.8 g
- Link to USDA Database entry
- ^{†}Percentages estimated using US recommendations for adults, except for potassium, which is estimated based on expert recommendation from the National Academies.

In a 100-gram reference amount, fenugreek seeds provide 1,350 kilojoules (323 kcal) of food energy and contain 9% water, 58% carbohydrates, 23% protein, and 6% fat. Fenugreek seeds provide calcium at 14% of the Daily Value (DV, table). Fenugreek seeds (per 100 grams) are a rich source of protein (46% DV), dietary fiber, B vitamins, and dietary minerals, particularly manganese (59% DV) and iron (262% DV) (table).

=== Dietary supplement ===
Fenugreek dietary supplements are manufactured from powdered seeds into capsules, loose powders, teas, and liquid extracts in many countries. No high-quality evidence supports that these products have any clinical effectiveness.

=== Animal feed ===
Fenugreek is sometimes used as animal feed. It provides a green fodder palatable to ruminants. The seeds are also used to feed fish and domestic rabbits.

=== Food additive ===
Fenugreek seeds and leaves contain sotolon, which imparts the aroma of fenugreek and curry in high concentrations, and maple syrup or caramel in lower concentrations. Fenugreek is used as a flavoring agent in imitation maple syrup or tea, and as a dietary supplement.

== Research ==
Constituents of fenugreek seeds include flavonoids, alkaloids, coumarins, vitamins, and saponins; the most prevalent alkaloid is trigonelline and coumarins include cinnamic acid and scopoletin. Research into whether fenugreek reduces biomarkers in people with diabetes and with prediabetic conditions is of limited quality.

As of 2023, no high-quality evidence has been found for whether fenugreek is safe and effective in relieving dysmenorrhea or improving lactation during breastfeeding. Studies of fenugreek are characterized as having variable, poor experimental design and quality, including small numbers of subjects, failure to describe methods, inconsistency and duration of dosing, and not recording adverse effects.

Because research on the potential biological effects of consuming fenugreek has provided no high-quality evidence for health or antidisease effect, fenugreek is not approved or recommended for clinical use by the United States Food and Drug Administration.

== Traditional medicine ==
Although once a folk remedy for an insufficient milk supply when nursing, no good evidence indicates that fenugreek is effective or safe for this use, nor is it useful in traditional practices for treating dysmenorrhea, inflammation, diabetes, or any human disorder.

== Adverse effects and allergies ==
The use of fenugreek has the potential for serious adverse effects, as it may be unsafe for women with hormone-sensitive cancers. Fenugreek is not safe for use during pregnancy, as it has possible abortifacient effects and may induce preterm uterine contractions.

Some people are allergic to fenugreek, including those with peanut allergy or chickpea allergy. Fenugreek seeds can cause diarrhea, dyspepsia, abdominal distention, flatulence, and perspiration, and impart a maple-like smell to sweat, urine, or breast milk. A risk of hypoglycemia exists, particularly in people with diabetes, and it may interfere with the activity of antidiabetic drugs. Because of the high content of coumarin-like compounds in fenugreek, it may interfere with the activity and dosing of anticoagulants and antiplatelet drugs.

Fenugreek sprouts, cultivated from a single specific batch of seeds imported from Egypt into Germany in 2009, were suspected as the source of the 2011 outbreak of Escherichia coli O104:H4 in Germany and France. Identification of a common producer and a single batch of fenugreek seeds was evidence for the origin of the outbreaks.
