= Saloma (disambiguation) =

Saloma was the stage name of Singaporean-Malaysian singer and film actress Salmah binti Ismail (1935–1983).

Saloma may also refer to:

- Saloma Link, pedestrian footbridge in Kuala Lumpur named after the actress
- Caesar Saloma (born 1960), Filipino physicist and former dean
- Saloma, Kentucky, United States, an unincorporated community
- Saloma, a style of music of Panama

== See also ==
- Salma (disambiguation)
- Salome (disambiguation)
- Shalom (disambiguation)
- Salam (disambiguation)
