= Salome (disambiguation) =

Salome (c. early 1st century CE) was the daughter of Herodias, and nemesis of John the Baptist (Mark 6:17–29 and Matthew 14:3–11).

Salome or Salomé may also refer to:

== People with the mononym ==
- Salome Alexandra (139–67 BCE), Queen regnant of Judea (76–67 BCE)
- Salome I (69 BCE–10 CE), Herod the Great's sister
- Salome (daughter of Herod the Great) (14 BCE–1st century CE), daughter of Herod the Great
- Salome (disciple) (c. early 1st century CE), disciple of Jesus
- Salome, the first wife of Joseph, guardian of Jesus in Eastern Orthodox Church tradition
- Salome (Gospel of James), midwife's friend in an apocryphal Nativity gospel who doubted Mary's virginity
- Salome of Ujarma (died about 361), daughter of Tiridates III of Armenia and wife of Rev II of Iberia; also known as Salome of Armenia
- Salomé (singer) (born 1939), Spanish singer
- Salomé (artist) (born 1954), German artist
- Salome MC (born 1985), Iranian/Turkish MC

== People with the given name ==
- Salome (given name), a list of people with this given name

== People with the surname ==
- Théodore Salomé (1834–1896), French organist and composer
- Lou Andreas-Salomé (1861–1937), Russian-born psychoanalyst and writer
- Greta Salóme (born 1986), Icelandic singer and violinist

== Places ==
- Salome, Arizona, a census-designated place in La Paz County, Arizona, United States
- Salomé, Nord, a commune in northern France

== Arts, entertainment, and media ==
=== Fictional entities ===
- Salome, the main character in Tom Robbins' novel, Skinny Legs and All
- Salome, a fictional West Texas town in Tin Cup
- Salome Agrippa, in the TV series True Blood

=== Film and television ===
- Salomè (1910 film), Italian film by Ugo Falena
- Salomé (1918 film), a film starring Theda Bara
- Salomé (1923 film), American silent film starring Alla Nazimova
- Salome, Where She Danced (1945 film), American film starring Yvonne De Carlo
- Salome (1953 film), American film starring Rita Hayworth
- Salome (Wednesday Theatre), a 1968 Australian television play
- Salome (1972 film), an Italian film, directed by Carmelo Bene
- Salome (1973 film), a short horror film by Clive Barker
- Salomè (1986 film), Italian film
- Salomé (TV series) (2001–2002), a Mexican telenovela starring Edith González
- Salomé (2002 film), Spanish film by Carlos Saura
- Wilde Salomé (2011) American documentary-drama film directed by Al Pacino
- Salomé (2013 film), American film by Al Pacino

=== Literature ===
- "Salome", a poem by Carol Ann Duffy, featured in The World's Wife (1999)
- Salome: The Wandering Jewess, a 1930 novel by George Sylvester Viereck and Paul Eldridge

=== Music ===
==== Albums ====
- Salomè (album), a 1981 album by Mina
- Salome (Marriages album)
- Salomé – The Seventh Veil, a 2007 album by Xandria, which also features the song "Salomé"

==== Songs ====
- "Salomé" (song), a 1999 song written by Chayanne
- "Salome", a song in the 1943 film Du Barry Was a Lady
- "Salome", a song by The House of Love from The House of Love
- "Salomé", a 1990 song by U2 included in the 1992 single "Even Better Than the Real Thing"
- "Salome", a 2000 song by Alcazar from Casino
- "Salome", a 1997 song by Lili Haydn from Lili
- "Salome", a song by the Old 97s from Too Far to Care
- "Salome", a 2012 song by Kaya
- "Salome", a 2004 song by Stormwitch from Witchcraft
- "Salomé", a 1979 song written by Jean-Patrick Capdevielle

==== Piano ====
- "Salomé", 1909, one of Mel Bonis' Femme de Légende

=== Stage works ===
- Salome (play), an 1893 play by Oscar Wilde
- Salome (opera), a 1905 German opera by Richard Strauss based on Wilde's play
- Vision of Salomé, a 1906 interpretation of Oscar Wilde's play, produced by Maud Allan
- La tragédie de Salomé, a 1907 ballet by Florent Schmitt
- Salomé (Mariotte), a 1908 French opera by Antoine Mariotte based on Wilde's play
- Salome, a 1978 ballet in two acts by Peter Maxwell Davies with choreography by Flemming Flindt

=== Visual arts ===
- Salome, a c. 1510–1530 painting by Giampietrino
- Salome, a 1512–1516 painting by Alonso Berruguete
- Salome (Titian, Rome), a c. 1515 oil painting by Titian
- Salome (Titian, Madrid), a c. 1550 oil painting by Titian
- Salome (Titian, private collection), a c. 1570 oil painting by Titian
- Salome, a c. 1530 painting by Lucas Cranach the Elder
- Salomé (Moretto), a 1540 oil painting by Moretto da Brescia
- Salome, a 1615–1620 painting by Giovanni Battista Caracciolo
- Salome, an 1870 painting by Henri Regnault
- Salome (Stuck), a 1906 painting by Franz von Stuck
- Salome, a 1909 painting by Robert Henri
- Salome with the Head of John the Baptist (disambiguation)

== Other uses ==
- Salome (software), an open-source software for numerical simulation

== See also ==
- Sainte-Marie-Salomé, Quebec, a parish municipality in Québec, Canada
- Shalom (disambiguation)
- Salam (disambiguation)
- Salma (disambiguation)
