= Judith I =

1901 painting by Gustav Klimt

Judith and the Head of Holofernes
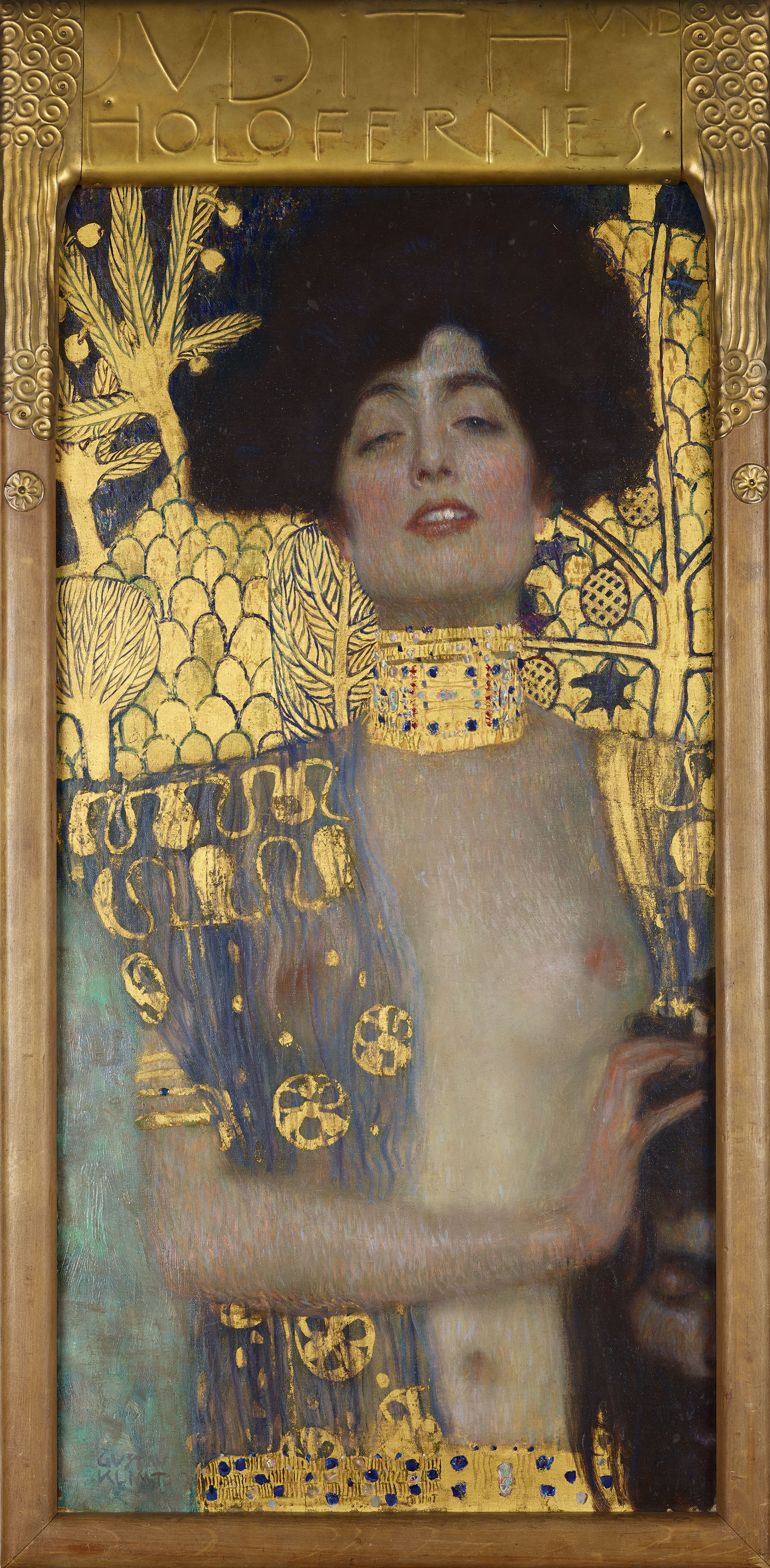
- Artist: Gustav Klimt
- Year: 1901
- Medium: Oil on canvas
- Dimensions: 84 cm × 42 cm (33 in × 17 in)
- Location: Österreichische Galerie Belvedere; Vienna

Judith and the Head of Holofernes (also known as Judith I, German: Judith und Holofernes) is an oil painting by Gustav Klimt, painted in 1901. It depicts the biblical figure Judith holding the head of Holofernes after beheading him. The beheading and its aftermath have been commonly portrayed in art since the Renaissance, and Klimt himself painted a second work depicting the subject in 1909.

== Context and influences ==
Judith was the biblical heroine who seduced and then decapitated General Holofernes in order to save her home city of Bethulia from destruction by the Assyrian army. When Klimt addressed the biblical theme of Judith, the historical course of art had already codified its main interpretation and preferred representation. Many paintings exist describing the episode in a heroic manner, especially expressing Judith's courage and virtuous nature. Judith appears as God's instrument of salvation, but the violence of her action cannot be denied and is dramatically shown in Caravaggio's rendering, as well as those of Gentileschi and Bigot. Other representations have depicted the subsequent moment, when a dazed Judith holds Holofernes' severed head, as Moreau and Allori anticipate in their suggestive mythological paintings.

Klimt deliberately ignores any narrative reference whatsoever and concentrates his pictorial rendering solely on to Judith, so much so that he cuts off Holofernes' head at the right margin. And there is no trace of a bloodied sword as if the heroine would have used a different weapon: an omission that legitimates association with Salome. The moment preceding the killing – the seduction of Nebuchadnezzar's general – seems to coalesce with the conclusive part of the story.

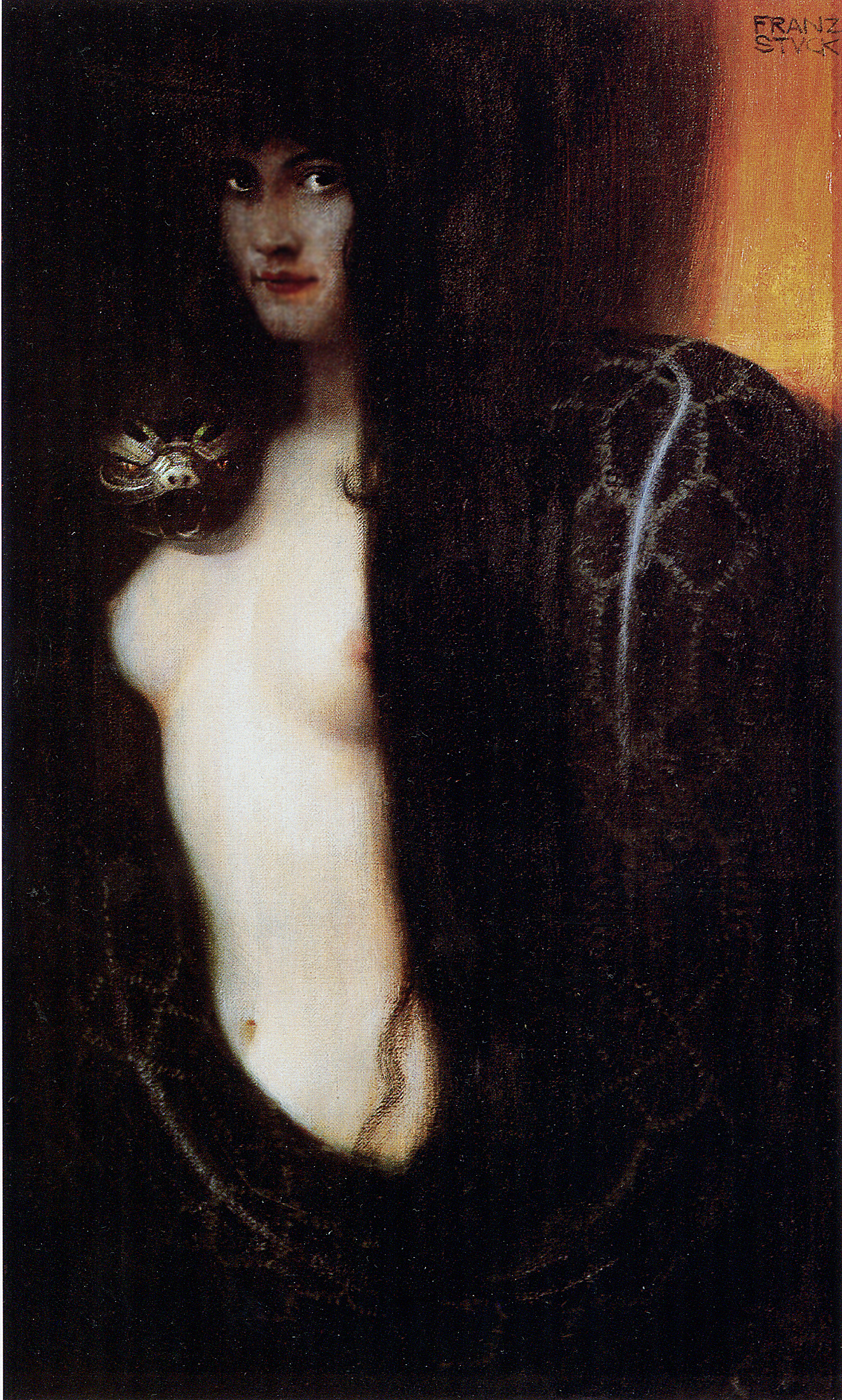
The Sin, 1893, by Franz Stuck

Judith I shares elements of its composition and symbolism with The Sin by Franz Stuck: the temptation illustrated by the German painter becomes the model for Klimt's femme fatale by suggesting the posture of the disrobed and evanescent body as a focal piece of the canvas, as well as the facial set. Judith's force originates from the close-up and the solidity of posture, rendered by the orthogonal projection of lines: to the body's verticality (and that of Holofernes') corresponds the horizontal parallels in the lower margin: those of the arm, the shoulders joined by the collier, and finally the hair base.

== Analysis ==
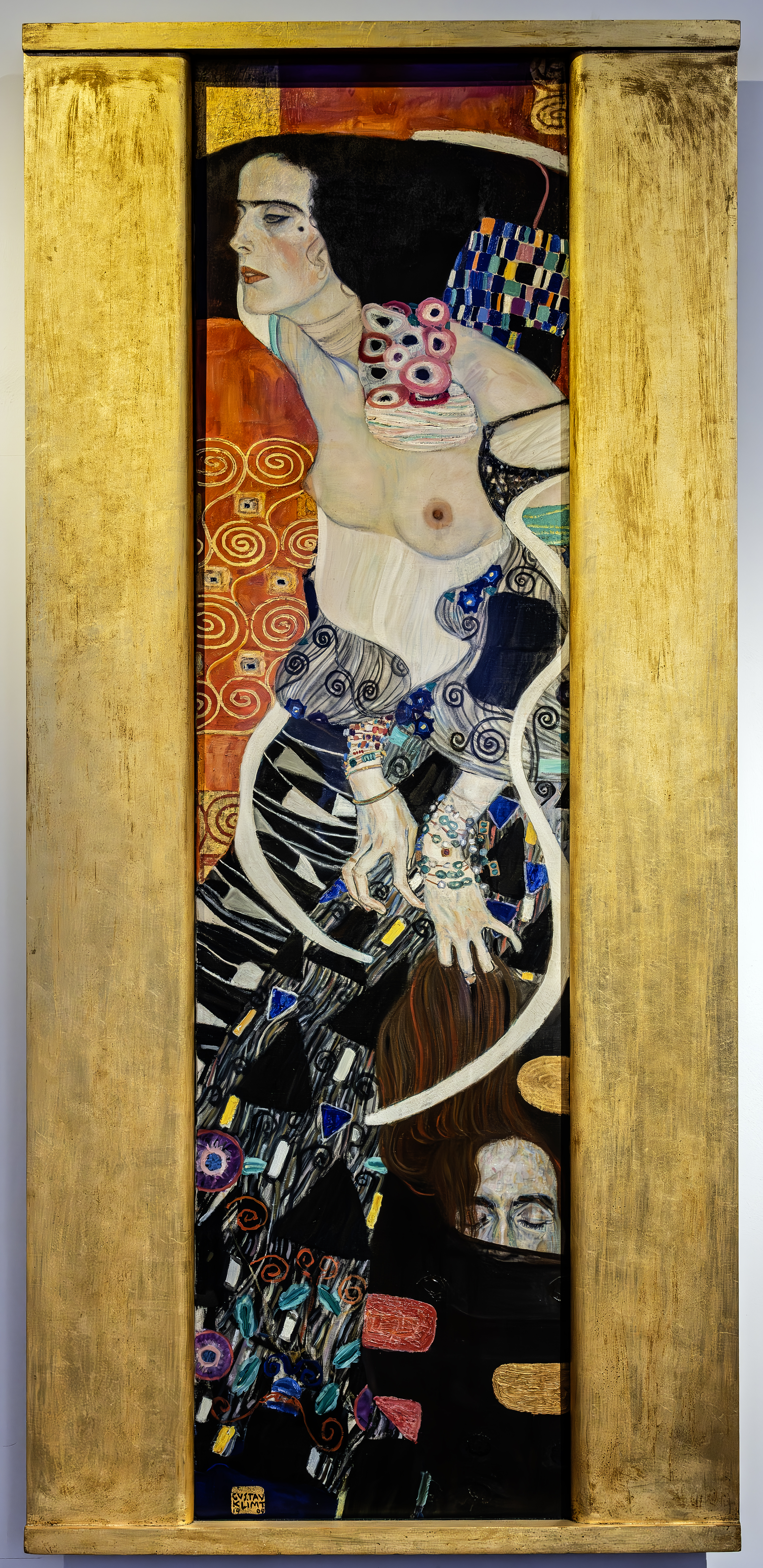
Judith II, 1909, by Klimt

Judith's face exudes a mixed charge of voluptuousness and perversion. Its traits are transfigured so as to obtain the greatest degree of intensity and seduction, which Klimt achieves by placing the woman on an unattainable plane. Notwithstanding the alteration of features, one can recognise Klimt's friend (and, possibly, lover), Viennese socialite Adele Bloch-Bauer, the subject of another two portraits respectively done in 1907 and 1912, and also painted in the Pallas Athena. The slightly lifted head has a sense of pride, whereas her visage is languid and sensual, with parted lips in between defiance and seduction. Franz A. J. Szabo describes it best as a "[symbol of] triumph of the erotic feminine principle over the aggressive masculine one". Her half-closed gaze, which also ties into an expression of pleasure, directly confronts the viewer of all this. In 1903, author and critic Felix Salten describes Judith's expression as one "with a sultry fire in her dark glances, cruelty in the lines of her mouth, and nostrils trembling with passion. Mysterious forces seem to be slumbering within this enticing female". Although Judith had typically been interpreted as the pious widow simply fulfilling a higher duty, in Judith I she is a paradigm of the femme fatale Klimt repeatedly portrayed in his work. This new version of Judith seems to hint more to a sexual subtext that appears absent from the Biblical story. The contrast between the black hair and the golden luminosity of the background enhance elegance and exaltation. The fashionable hairdo is emphasized by the stylised motifs of the trees fanning on the sides. Her disheveled dark green, semi-sheer garment, giving the viewer a view of her nearly bare torso, alludes to the fact that Judith beguiled the general Holofernes before decapitating him.

In the 1901 version, Judith maintains a magnetic fascination and sensuality, subsequently abandoned by Klimt in his Judith II, where she acquires sharper traits and a fierce expression. In its formal qualities, the first version illustrates a heroine with the archetypal features of the bewitching and charming ladies described by symbolist artists and writers such as Wilde, Vasnetsov, Moreau, and others. She revels in her power and sexuality—so much so that critics mislabeled Klimt's Judith as Salome, the title character from Oscar Wilde's 1891 tragedy. To stress and re-emphasize that the woman was actually Judith and not Salome he had his brother, Georg, make the metal frame for him with "Judith and Holofernes" engraved on it.

== See also ==
- List of paintings by Gustav Klimt
- List of Austrian artists and architects

== Bibliography ==
- Zeri, Federico (1998), Giuditta I (in Italian), Rizzoli.
- Kinsella, Eileen (January 2007), "Gold Rush", ARTnews.
- Sabarsky, Serge (1983), Gustav Klimt: Drawings, et al., Moyer Bell.
- Whitford, Frank (1990), Klimt, Thames and Hudson.
