= The Kiss of the Sphinx =

1895 painting by Franz Stuck

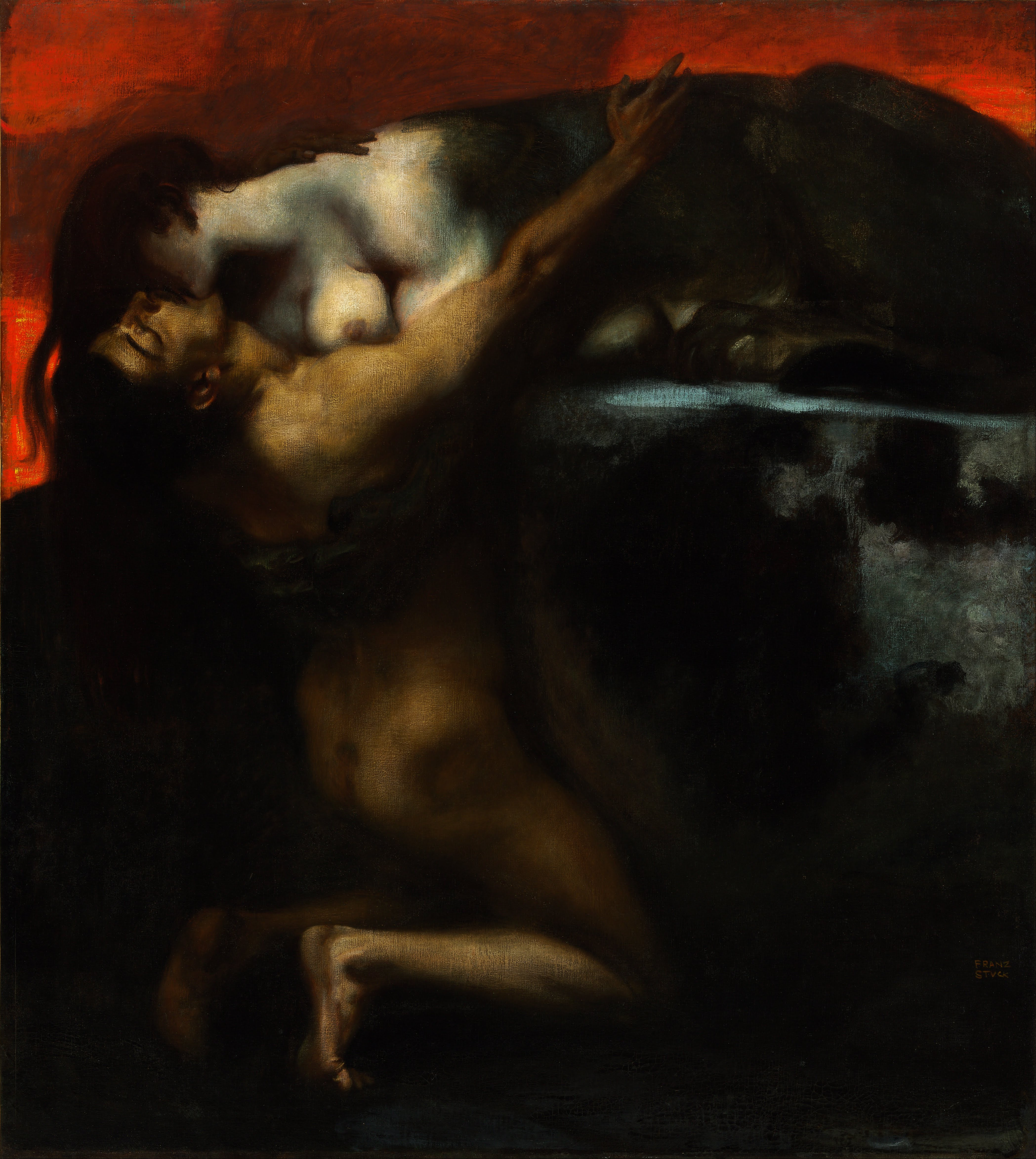
- Artist: Franz Stuck
- Year: 1895
- Medium: Oil on canvas
- Dimensions: 162.5 cm × 145.5 cm (64.0 in × 57.3 in)
- Location: Museum of Fine Arts; Budapest

The Kiss of the Sphinx is an oil on canvas painting of 1895 by the German symbolist artist Franz Stuck. It was painted in the same year that Stuck became a professor at Academy of Fine Arts, Munich. The iconography of a sensuous, dangerous femme fatale is a recurring item in Stuck's work.
