= Taslima =

- Gender: Female

Origin
- Origin: Arabic
- Meaning: "Greeting", "Salutation", and "Submission".

Other names
- Related names: Taslim

Taslima or Tasleema (Arabic: تسْليما \ تسْليمة taslīmah), also spelled Taslimah or Tasleemah, is an Arabic female given name. It has many possible meanings, including "greeting," "submission," "obedience, acceptance, preservation, salutation, compliance (surrender), submission (اِسْتِسْلام istislām)," or "satisfaction, gratification, willingness, delight."

The name stems from the male noun-name Salaam and the male form of the name is Taslim.

== Given name ==
- Taslima Abed, Bangladesh politician and former government minister
- Taslima Akhter (born 1974), Bangladeshi activist and photographer
- Taslima Nasrin (born 1962), Bangladeshi physician, author, and women's rights activist
