= Taslim (name) =

- Gender: Male

Origin
- Origin: Arabic
- Meaning: "Greeting", "Salutation", and "Submission".

Other names
- Related names: Taslima

Taslim or Tasleem (Arabic: تسليم taslīm) is an Arabic male given name, that can mean Greeting or Submission, among other meanings. Also, the name bears the meanings "obedience, acceptance, preservation, salutation, compliance (surrender), submission (اِسْتِسْلام istislām)" or "satisfaction, gratification, willingness, delight".

Today, the name Taslim is not always associated with the Arab Muslim community, it is also largely used by Chinese Indonesians regardless of their religion.

The name stems from the male noun-name Salaam and the female form of the name is Taslima.

== Given name ==
- Taslim Arif, Pakistani cricketer
- Taslim Olawale Elias, Nigerian jurist

== Surname ==
- Joe Taslim, Indonesian actor and martial artist
