= The Guardian of Paradise =

Painting by Franz Stuck

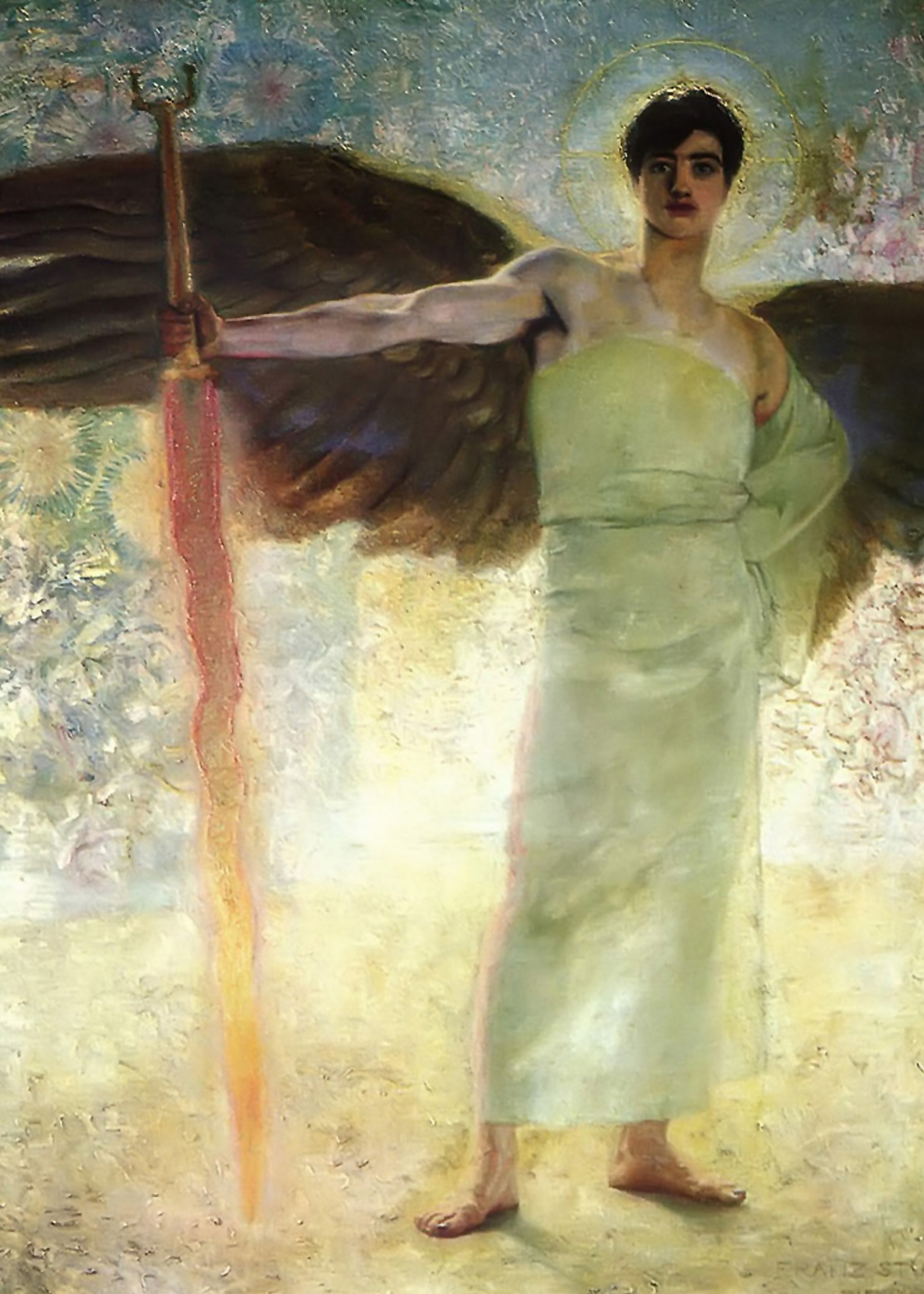
- Artist: Franz Stuck
- Year: 1889
- Medium: Oil on canvas
- Dimensions: 250 cm × 167 cm (98 in × 66 in)
- Location: Museum Villa Stuck; Munich

The Guardian of Paradise (German: Der Wächter des Paradieses) is an 1889 painting by the German artist Franz Stuck. It shows a glowing angel with bird-like wings and a flaming sword.

It was Stuck's first large oil painting. It was entered into the 1889 art exhibition at the Glaspalast in Munich, where it won a gold medal and 6000 Mark. The painting became a breakthrough for Stuck and made him a recognised symbolist artist.

It is kept at the Museum Villa Stuck in Munich.
