= Shalom (disambiguation) =

Shalom is the Hebrew word for hello, goodbye, and peace, and is a Hebrew given name.

Shalom, Sholom, or Sholem may also refer to:

== Media ==
- Shalom (newspaper), Iran's first Jewish newspaper, launched in 1910
- Shalom (film), a 1973 film by director Yaky Yosha
- Shalom (TV channel), an Indian religious channel
- Shalom TV, an American Jewish television channel
- Şalom, a Jewish weekly newspaper published in Istanbul, Turkey
- Shalom, the season premiere of NCIS season 4
- Shabbat Shalom (NCIS), a season 10 episode of NCIS
- Shalom (album), an album by The Rabbis' Sons
- Shalom (band), a 1990s Czech synth-pop band
- Shalom (singer), Jamaican reggae artist

== People ==
=== As a surname ===
- Silvan Shalom (born 1958), Israeli politician
- Judy Shalom Nir-Mozes (born 1958), Israeli heiress and talk-show host, wife of Silvan Shalom
- Stephen Shalom, American professor

=== As a given name ===
- Sholem Aleichem (1859–1916), Yiddish author
- Shalom Almond, Australian filmmaker
- Sholem Asch (1880–1957), Yiddish author
- Shalom Auslander (born 1970), American author
- Shalom Carmy (born 1948), American rabbi and scholar
- Sholom Dovber Schneersohn (1860–1920), chasidic rebbe
- Yosef Shalom Elyashiv (1910–2012), Israeli rabbi and posek
- Shalom Hanoch (born 1946), Israeli rock musician
- Shalom Harlow (born 1973), Canadian model and actress
- Shalom Luani (born 1994), American football player
- Sholom Schwadron (1912–1997), Israeli rabbi known as the "Maggid of Jerusalem"
- Sholom Mordechai Schwadron (1835–1911), Ukrainian rabbi and posek known as the Maharsham
- Sholom Schwartzbard (1886–1938), Bessarabian poet, assassin of Symon Petliura
- Shalom Shachna (died 1558), rabbi and Talmudist
- Papi Turgeman (Shalom Charly Turgeman, born 1970), Israeli basketball player

== Organizations ==
- Brit Tzedek v'Shalom
- Brit Shalom (political organization)
- Gush Shalom
- Hevel Shalom
- Neve Shalom
- Shalom Sesame
- Neve Shalom Synagogue in İstanbul, Turkey
- Shalom Park in Charlotte, North Carolina and Denver, Colorado
- Shalom Meir Tower in Tel Aviv
- Valley Beth Shalom in Encino, California

== Other uses ==
- SHALOM (satellite), a join satellite mission between the Israeli Space Agency and the Italian Space Agency
- SS Shalom, an ocean liner operated by Zim Lines, Israel 1964–1967

== See also ==
- Beth Shalom (disambiguation)
- Jewish greetings
- Salaam (disambiguation)
- Scholem
- Shalom aleichem (disambiguation)
- Salome (disambiguation)
- Salam (disambiguation)
- Salma (disambiguation)
