= The Sin (Stuck) =

1893 painting by Franz Stuck

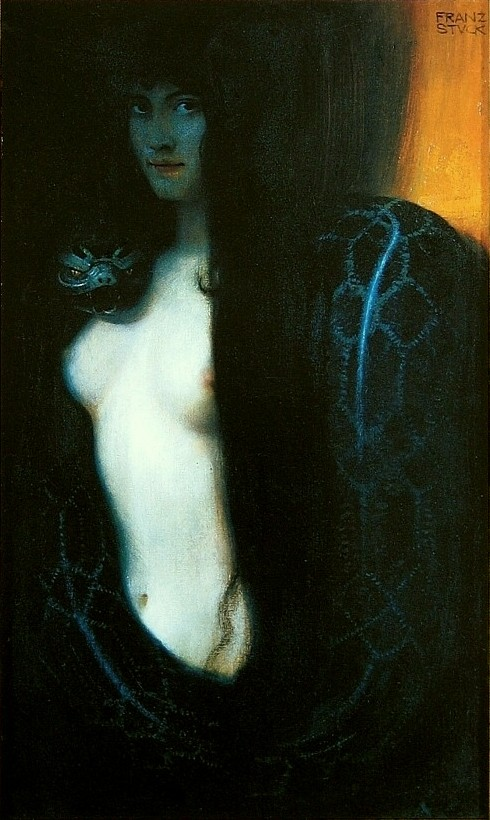
- The Sin shows von Stuck's use of Symbolisitic technique to illustrate the idea of sin, including a blue cast, and veiling or decapitating the woman with shadow.
- Artist: Franz Stuck
- Year: 1893
- Medium: Oil on canvas
- Movement: Symbolist painting, Decadentism
- Subject: femme fatale, lust, sin, temptation
- Dimensions: 94.5 cm × 59.6 cm (37.2 in × 23.5 in)
- Location: Neue Pinakothek; Munich

The Sin (German: Die Sünde) is an 1893 painting by the German artist Franz Stuck. Stuck created twelve known versions of the painting. Some of these can be viewed at the Neue Pinakothek, in Munich, the National Gallery, in Berlin, the Galleria di arte Moderna, in Palermo, the Frye Art Museum, in Seattle, and at the Villa Stuck, in Munich, where it is enshrined in the artist's Künstleraltar. It depicts the nude Eve with a large serpent wrapped around her body. In the upper right corner is a bright field, while the rest of the surroundings are dark.

== History ==
A precursor to this painting was Stuck's drawing, History of the Allegories and Emblems, published in 1884. It shows a female figure standing between columns with Doric capitals. Half-columns with Doric capitals also form the sides of the gilded architectural frame for this later 1893 painting. It was during this time that an erotic type of woman, the femme fatale, was emerging with wide eyes, skimpy late 19th-century clothing and a seductive pose as Stuck's trademark. The motif was conceived as a development of Stuck's 1889 painting Sensuality (Die Sinnlichkeit). The Sin was first exhibited in 1893, at the inaugural exhibition of the Munich Secession, where it caused a sensation. It was bought by the Neue Pinakothek in Munich and became a critical and commercial breakthrough for Stuck. It has since become an emblematic painting for the symbolist movement. In 1899 in Vienna it received the "state gold medal" intended for foreign artists. In the Villa Stuck, completed in 1898, the painting has a special meaning. Since 1901, a version of The Sin with a gold frame has hung on a kind of "altar" in the then Stuck's studio. It was considered the "spatial and ideal center of the house".

== Description ==
External videos
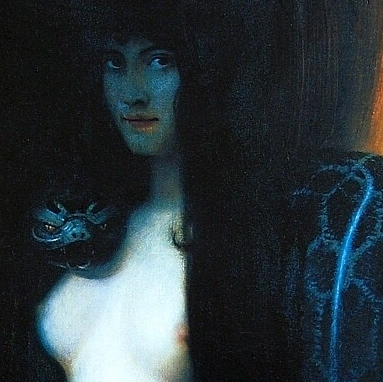
- Detail of Stuck's The Sin, showing the snake's head, Smarthistory

The painting has been owned by the Neue Pinakothek since 1893. The Sin is a waist-length portrait; the face of the woman is shown as a three-quarter portrait, and the face of the snake as an en face portrait.

The woman shown is Anna Maria Brandmaier from Bayerdilling, a childhood sweetheart and model of Stuck, who is in eye contact with the viewer. Her face is shadowed, but the pupils of her large eyes with white highlights appear turned sideways to the left. The mouth is closed. Compared to the rest of the face, these eyes form a strong chiaroscuro contrast. The long black hair surrounds the almost white body with its half-visible breasts. Nipples and navel form a downward stretched triangle with their points in the composition of the painting.

An enlarged dark blue giant snake decorated with light blue patterns coils around her body and neck, appears with its head resting on the woman's right shoulder and breast and also looking directly at the viewer. The snake's head has eyes with highlights and an open mouth with the animal typical fangs, which is intended to trigger an association with the dangerous nature of the animal for the viewer. The motif of the serpent, in close association with a woman, relates to the Old Testament fall, and is depicted in the Bible in the Book of Genesis. The snake is thus presented in Stuck's picture as a symbol of seduction and danger. Above and to the right of the woman's white body, an orange-contrasted canvas forms the background, which can be construed as hellfire for those who succumb to temptations and sin. The unmistakable signature of the painter is also found in this colored area in the typeface typical of him: FRANZ STVCK. Otherwise the background is strikingly black and without depth.

The architectural picture frame has a special meaning for the painting. It is intended to emphasize the uniqueness of the painting in the exhibitions, which were usually overloaded at the time, and draw the viewers attention. Also, the frame bears the title of the painting in a specific contemporary font style: DIE SUENDE. In other versions of the painting, the title is DIE SVENDE, with the V and E appearing as a ligature. Here it can be noticed that Stuck had experience as a draftsman, graphic artist and illustrator. Stuck saw his handcrafted frames as part of a tactical masterpiece, where he not only created in his work, but also built his entire artistic life on it.

== Versions ==
There are 11 versions of the motif of sin by Franz Stuck, including this version as an oil painting with an individually designed gold frame. However, four are missing.

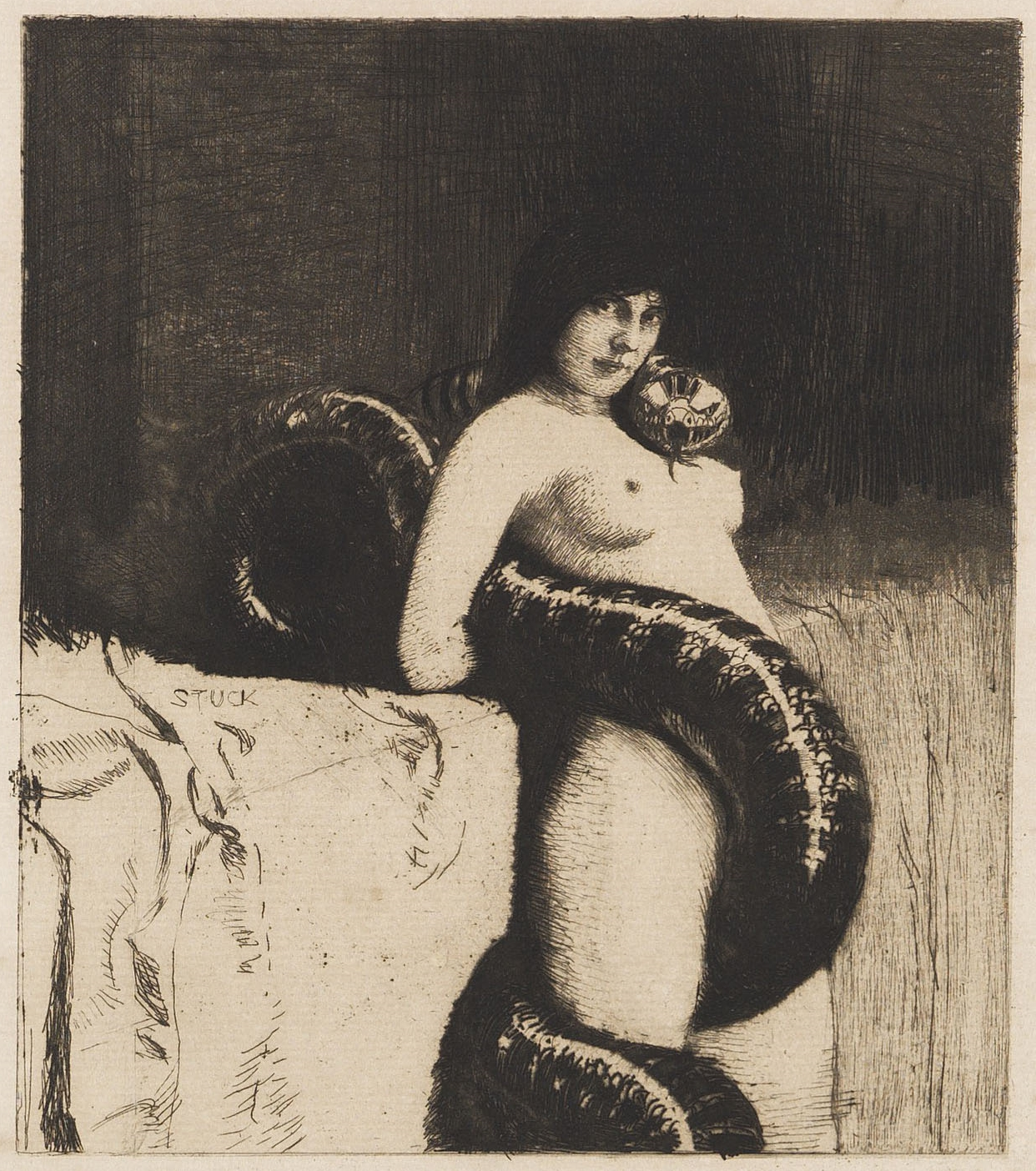
Sensuality, engraving, 1889

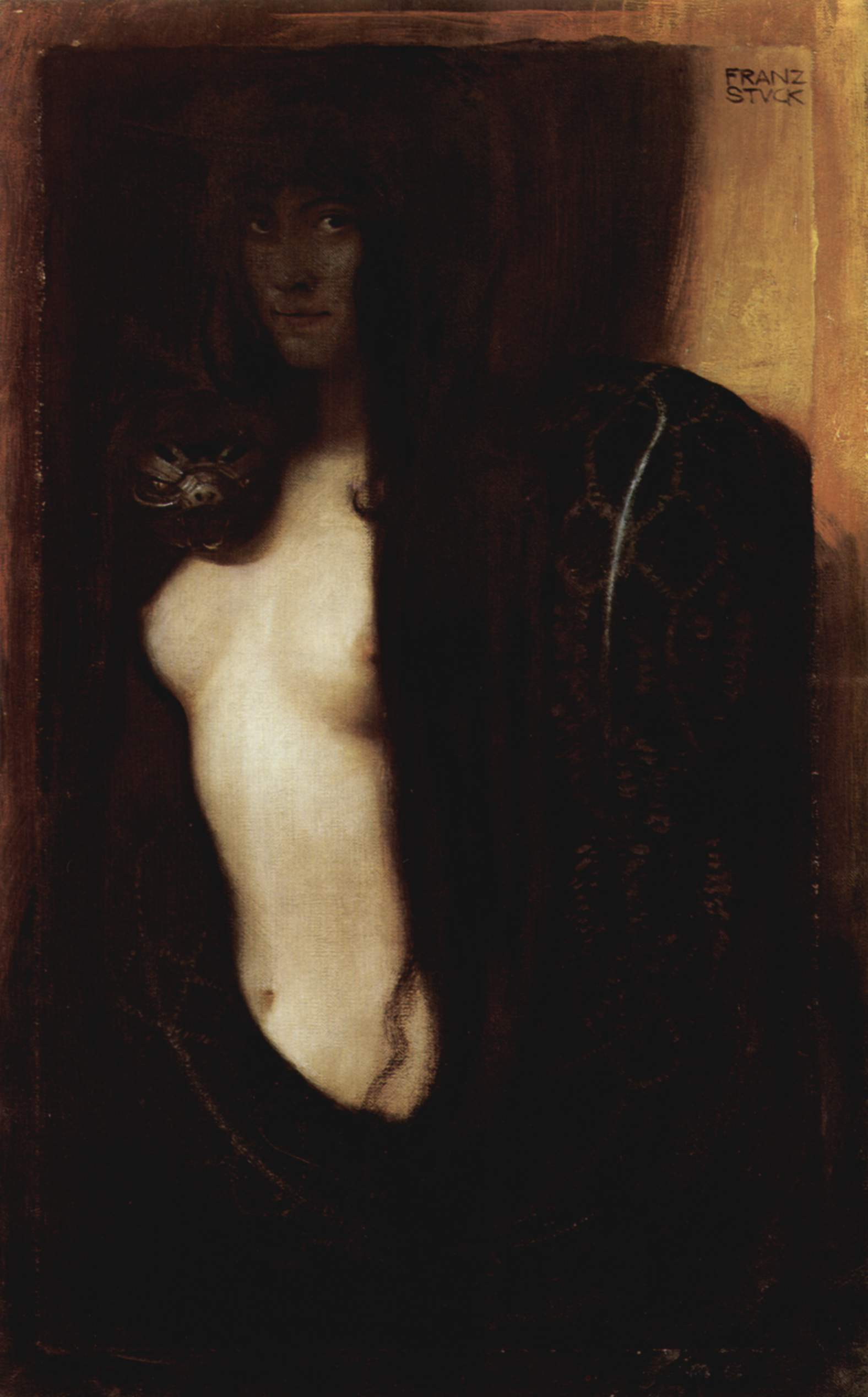
The Sin, 1893 Neue Pinakothek, Munich. Colors are warmer in this photograph of the painting. Inventory number 7925. Bavarian State Painting Collections - New Pinakothek in Munich. Oil on canvas, 94.5x59.5cm.

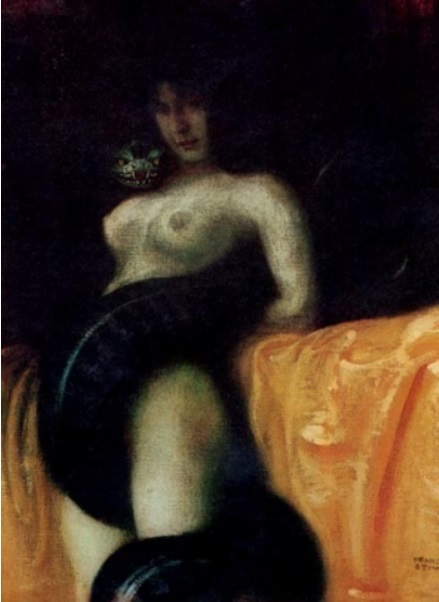
Oil painting, 1897

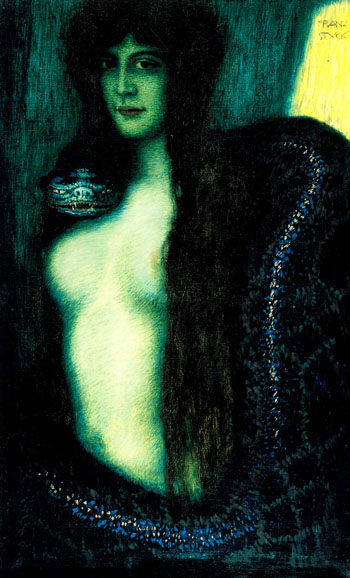
The Sin, 1906

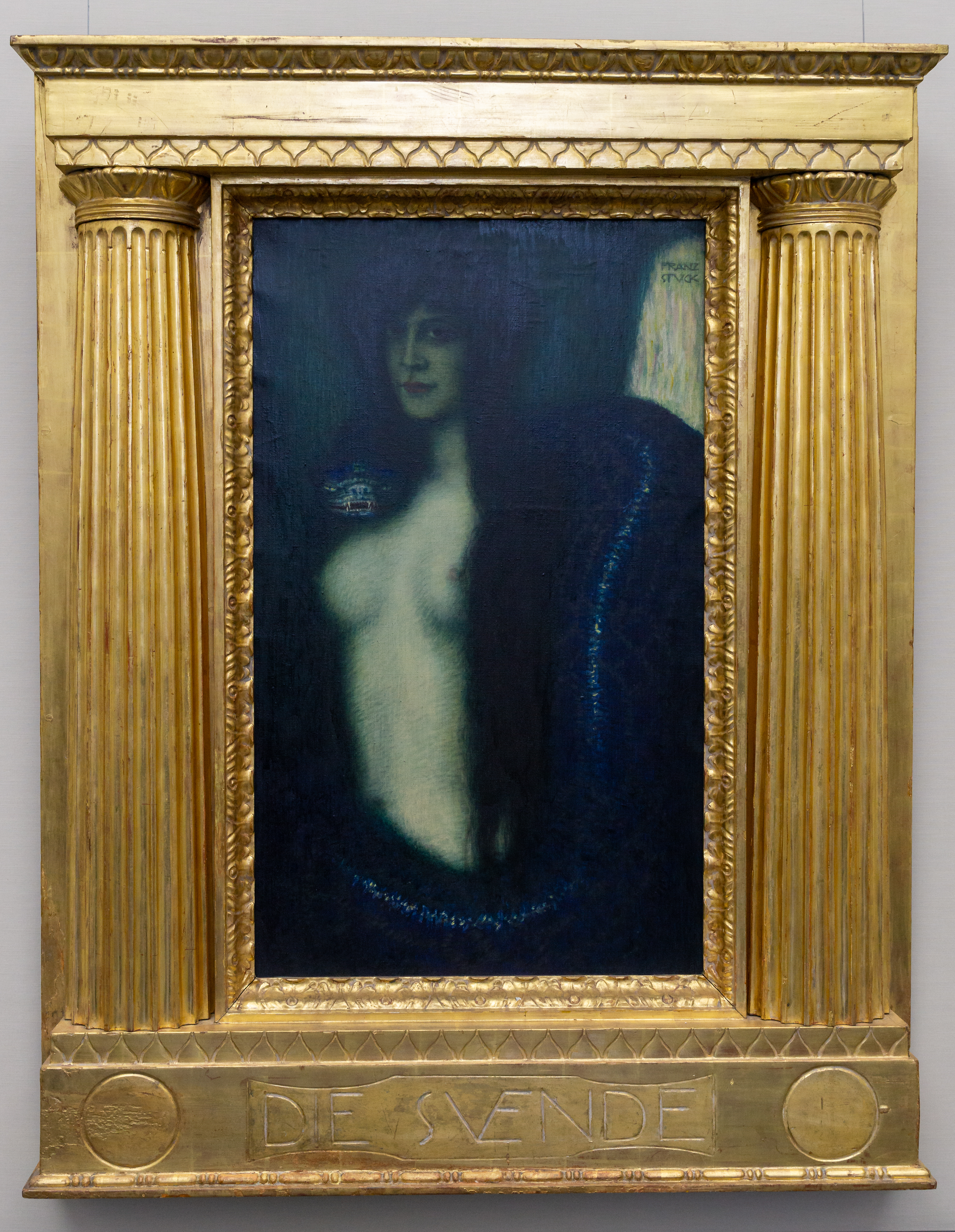
The Sin with frame, identity No.:FV 72, c. 1912, Old National Gallery, Berlin. Oil on canvas, Height x width: 88 x 52.5 cm.

== Analysis ==
According to contemporary interpreters, the painting was supposed to show the woman with her supposedly "insatiable sexuality" as a "man's seductress". Today's interpretations see in it rather the scenic, flat and shadowy nature of the composition. Accordingly, the snake only presents the woman's body in order to give it the role of a lure. Anyone who is attracted to it has to fear the hell fire, symbolized as an orange area in the top right. Stuck cleverly uses elements of contemporary morality, such as those advocated by the Church, to wield power over the human sex drive. Stuck uses and reduces the female body as a tool for his own will to power in relation to his career, recognition and material wealth.

=== Comparison to inspired work ===
Henry Ossawa Tanner would use elements of von Stuck's painting to create Salome, a work featuring the daughter of Herod Antipas who asked for the head of John the Baptist. Like von Stuck, Tanner lights the body of the nearly nude woman in blue and veils or decapitates her with shadow. Tanner tended to use blue as a spiritual color, but there context could assign it the values of holy judgement, damnation or death.

Stuck used colors, like Johann Wolfgang von Goethe, for psychological value. He once expressed that blue could symbolize "mystery, eternity and calm." However, the context is not right in von Stuck's The Sin to assign these values to blue. Rather, from context the blue laid across the woman's body with the face shaded in von Stuck's The Sin could be symbolize death or damnation. Unlike Tanner's painting, the woman in von Stuck's painting is not filled with horror; the blue accompanies mystery and temptation as an enticement and warning.

The tempting body of the femme fatale, meant to arouse lust, is surrounded by darkness, and the orange patch over the woman's shoulder may symbolize hell.
