= Shalom aleichem (disambiguation) =

- Shalom aleichem, Hebrew for "Peace be upon you"
- Shalom Aleichem (liturgy)

== See also ==
- Shalom (disambiguation)
- Sholem Aleichem, writer
- As-salamu alaykum
