= Salome (Titian, private collection) =

Painting by Titian

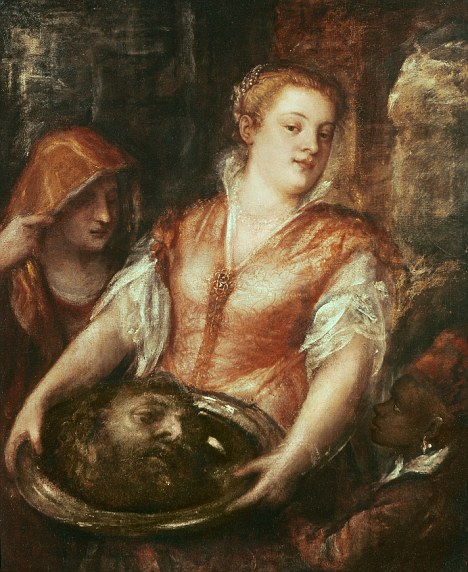
- Artist: Titian
- Year: c. 1570
- Medium: Oil on canvas
- Dimensions: 114 cm × 96 cm (45 in × 38 in)
- Location: Private collection

Salome, also called Salome with the Head of John the Baptist, is an oil painting by Titian, made in around 1570, and currently in a private collection. It is not to be confused with other compositions of Salome and Judith by Titian.

== Subject ==
Salome, in Jewish history, was the name borne by three women of the Herod dynasty. Titian depicts the daughter of Herodias by her first husband Herod Philip. She was the wife successively of Philip the Tetrarch and Aristobulus, son of Herod of Chalcis. This Salome is the only one of the three who is mentioned in the New Testament, and only in connection with the execution of John the Baptist. Herod Antipas, pleased by her dancing, offered her a reward "unto the half of my kingdom"; instructed by Herodias, she asked for John the Baptist's "head in a charger".

== History ==
This late work by Titian has been dated to the period 1567–1568. It was once owned by King Charles I, but having passed through a number of private hands, it was sold at auction for just £8,000 at Christie's, in December 1994, as lot 348, described incorrectly as a work "from the school of Titian". After the painting was sold on again in 2001, its true nature and value were revealed after cleaning.

== Description ==
Salome is depicted as a beautiful young woman, dressed in the finest clothing, while carrying the severed head of John the Baptist in a charger. She smiles, joyfully, and expresses no remorse with the macrabe trophy that she carries. Another woman, possibly a servant, looks from the left, while a young black page is seen at the bottom right.

== Versions ==
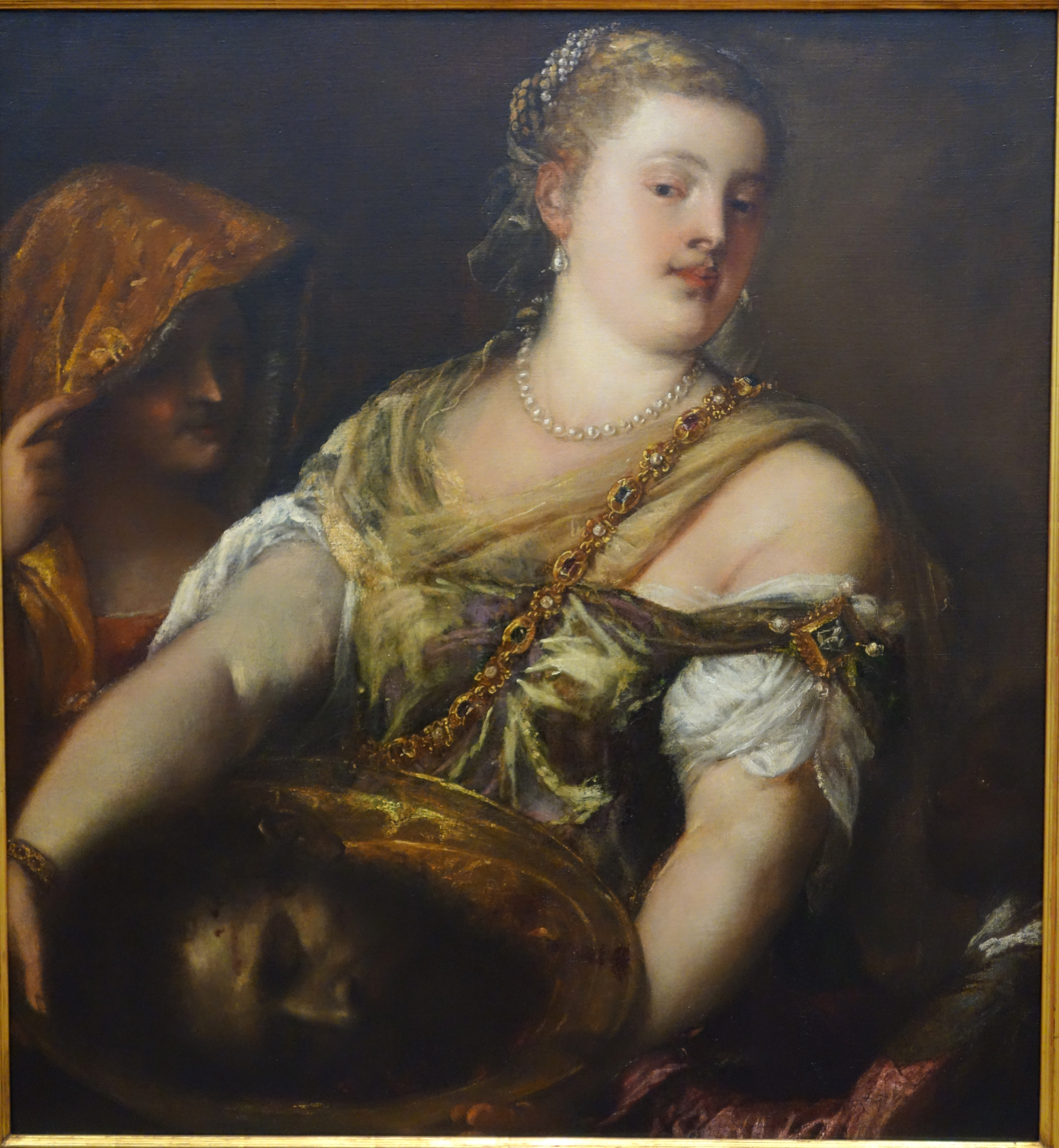
Version by Titian and his workshop, c. 1560–1570, in the NMWA, Tokyo (90 x 83.3 cm)

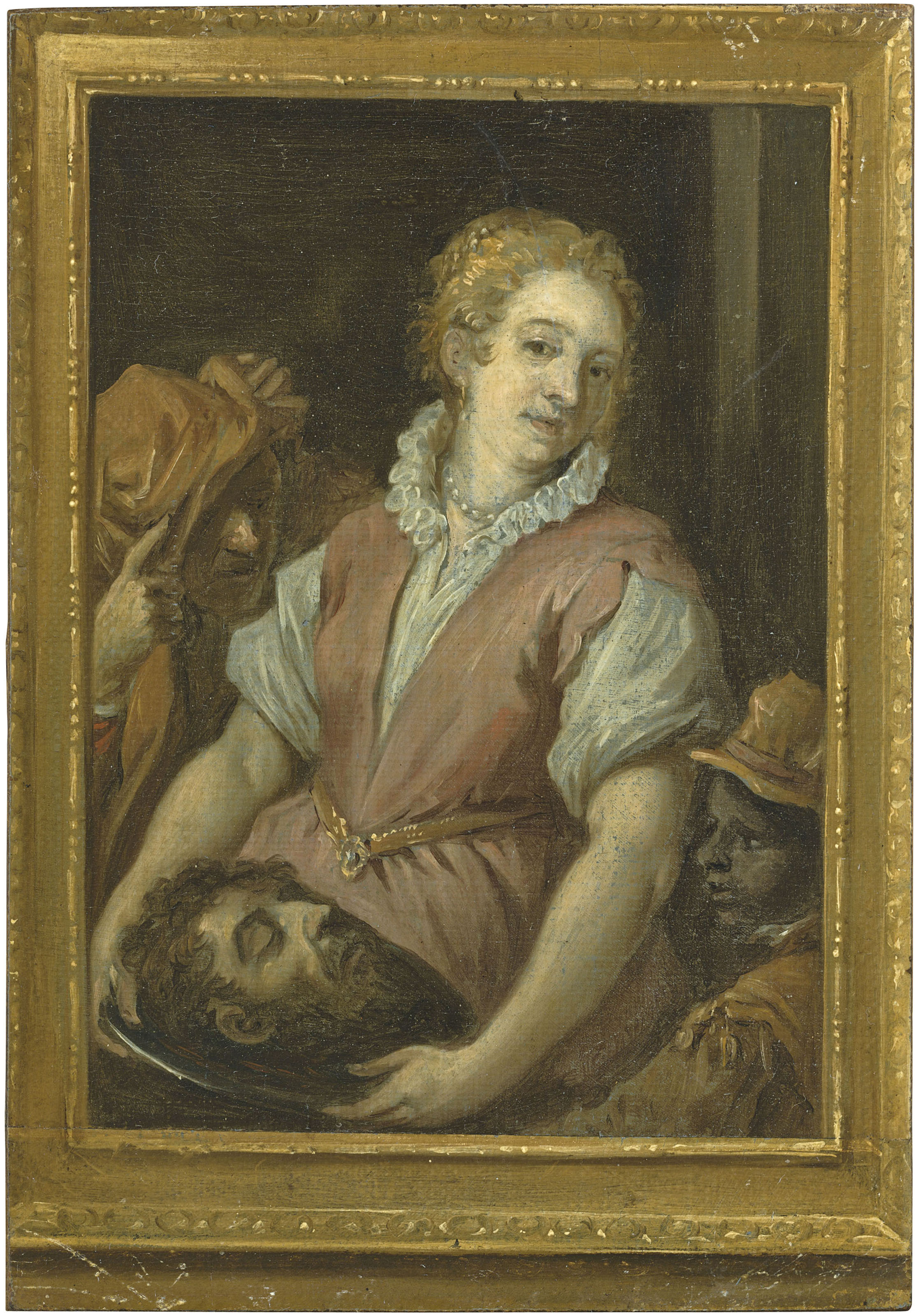
Painting by David Teniers II, after Titian, c. 1650 (17.1 x 12 cm)

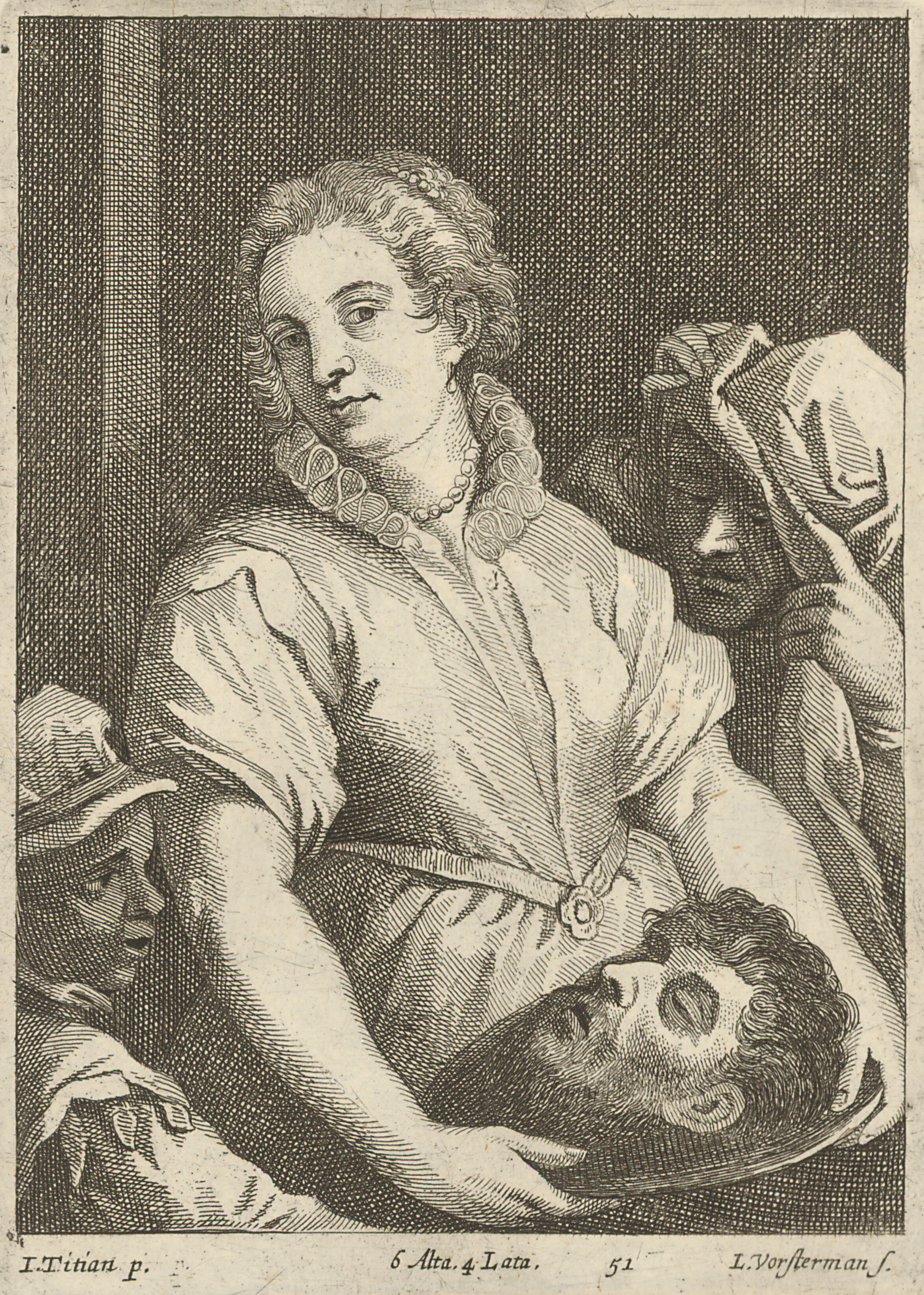
Engraving by Lucas Vorsterman II for the Theatrum Pictorium, 1673

== See also ==
- List of works by Titian

== Sources ==
- Brown, Jonathan (25 February 2010). "Couple settle after their 'Titian' was sold for a song". The Independent. Retrieved 23 November 2022.
- Chisholm, Hugh, ed. (1911). "Salome". Encyclopædia Britannica. Vol. 24 (11th ed.). Cambridge University Press. p. 85.
- McDonald, Craig (25 February 2010. "Brother and sister set to win damages after auctioneers sold £4m Titian masterpiece for £8k". Daily Record. Retrieved 23 November 2022.
- Moore, Matthew (25 February 2010). "Christie's sued for 'misidentifying Titian painting worth millions'". The Daily Telegraph. Retrieved 23 November 2022.
- Pignatti, Terisio (1981). Titian: The Complete Paintings. Vol. 2. Translated by Landry, Judith. London and New York: Granada. p. 56.
