= Scholem =

Scholem, derived from the Hebrew word shalom, meaning "peace", is a surname, and may refer to:

- Gershom Scholem (1897–1982), also known as Gerhard Scholem, a German-born Israeli Jewish philosopher and historian, the brother of Werner Scholem.
- Werner Scholem (1895–1940), a German Jewish Communist politician, the brother of Gershom Scholem.

Scholem may also be a given name and may refer to:

- Scholem Aleichem, also spelled Sholem Aleichem (1859–1916), the pen name of Sholem Naumovich Rabinovich, a popular humorist and Jewish author of Yiddish literature, including novels, short stories, and plays.
- Scholem Asch, also spelled Sholem Asch, a Polish-born American Jewish novelist, dramatist and essayist in the Yiddish language.

== See also ==
Shalom (disambiguation)
