= Al-Salam SC =

Several sports clubs are named Al-Salam SC or Al Salam SC, including:

- Al Salam SC (Esna), which plays in Egyptian Second Division football;
- Al-Salam SC (Iraq), which plays in Iraqi First Division League football;
- Al-Salam SC (Oman), which plays in the Oman Football Association's Second Division League, as well as in other sports.

== See also ==
- Al-Salam FC, South Sudanese football club
- Assalam F.C., East Timorese football club
- Salam Zgharta FC, Lebanese football club
- Salam (disambiguation)
