= Wounded Amazon (Stuck) =

Painting by Franz Stuck

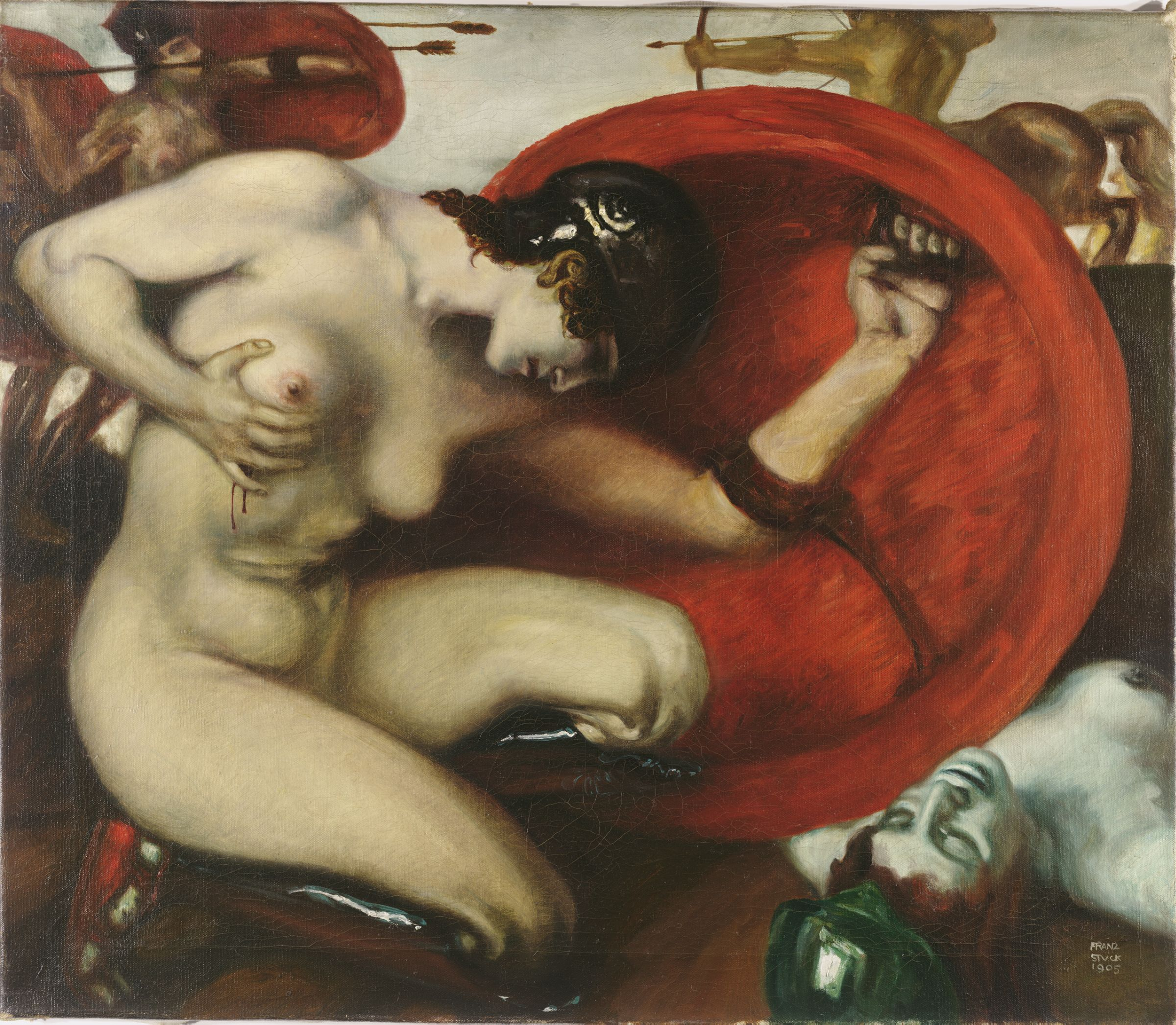
- Artist: Franz Stuck
- Year: 1904
- Medium: Oil on canvas
- Dimensions: 64.8 cm × 76.2 cm (25.5 in × 30.0 in)
- Location: Van Gogh Museum, Amsterdam

Wounded Amazon (German: Verwundete Amazone) is an oil on canvas painting by the German artist Franz von Stuck, created in 1904. The painting was made from photographs of a model posing in Stuck's studio. The artist made three versions of the painting. One is housed at the Van Gogh Museum, in Amsterdam, and one at the Busch–Reisinger Museum in Cambridge, Massachusetts.

== Description ==
It depicts a kneeling Amazon in a battle between Amazons and Centaurs, bleeding from a wound under her breast, while she held high her defence shield. Her looks express the pain that she is feeling, while she is completely naked, but still wears a helmet and lower leg metallic protection. A dead Amazon is seen lying in the ground, at the lower right, while at the background an Amazon and a Centaur are engaged in the fight.

The motif is not taken from any particular source material; it is a particular creation of the artist.

== See also ==
- Amazon statue types
- Women warriors in literature and culture
