= Franz von Stuck =

German painter (1863–1928)

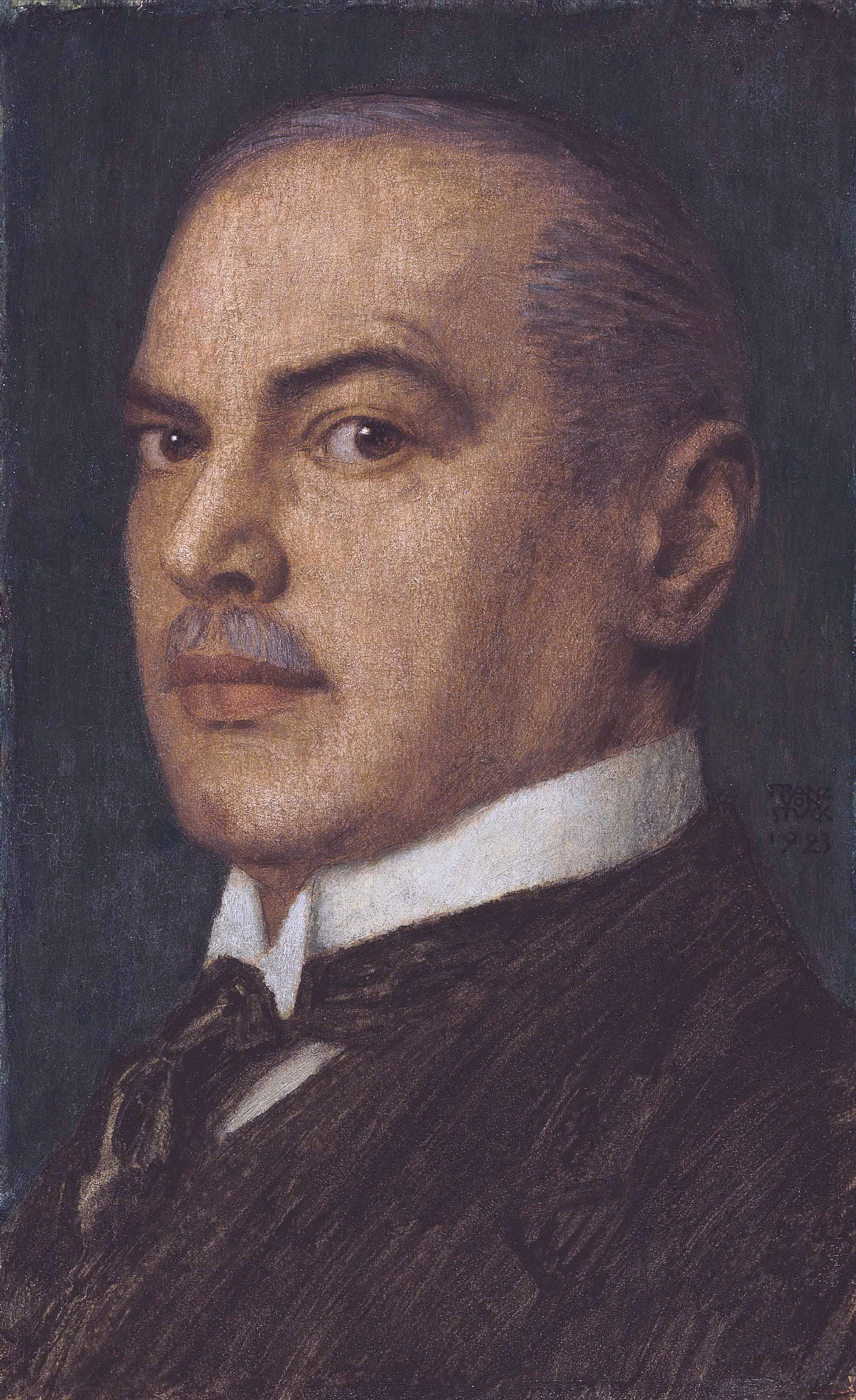
- Self-Portrait (1923)
- Born: Franz Stuck; 23 February 1863; Tettenweis, Kingdom of Bavaria, German Confederation
- Died: 30 August 1928 (aged 65); Munich, Weimar Republic
- Burial place: Munich Waldfriedhof
- Known for: Painting, sculpting, drawing
- Notable work: The Guardian of Paradise; Wounded Amazon; The Sin
- Movement: Symbolism

Signature
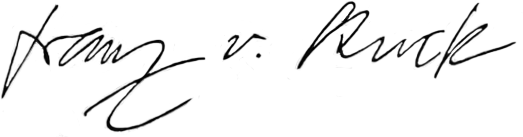

Franz Ritter von Stuck (February 23, 1863 – August 30, 1928), born Franz Stuck, was a German painter, sculptor, printmaker, and architect. Stuck was best known for his paintings of ancient mythology, receiving substantial critical acclaim with The Sin in 1892. In 1906, Stuck was awarded the Order of Merit of the Bavarian Crown and was henceforth known as Ritter von Stuck ("Knight of/from Stuck" in English).

== Life and career ==
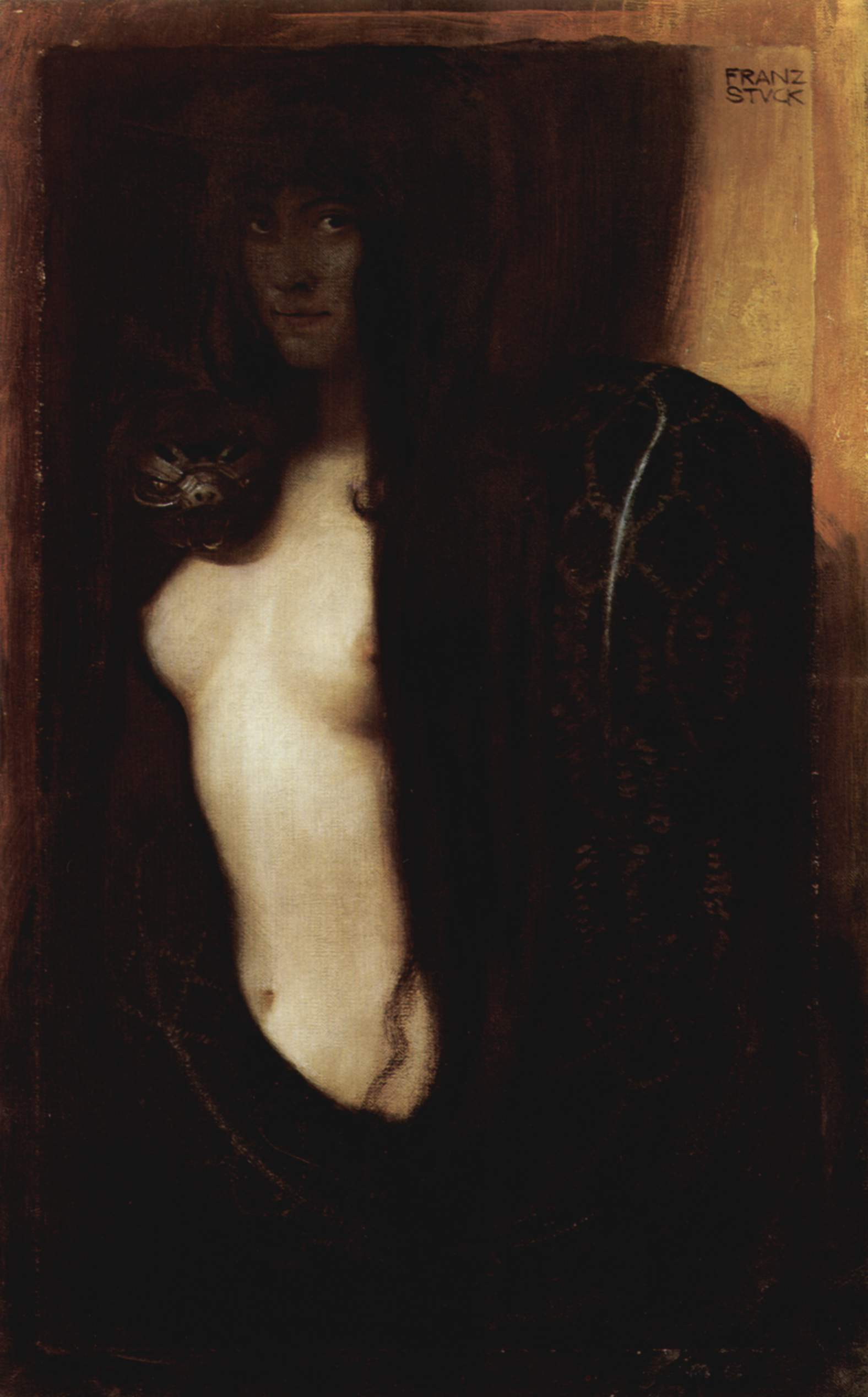
The Sin (Die Sünde), 1893

Born at Tettenweis near Passau, Stuck displayed an affinity for drawing and caricature from an early age. To begin his artistic education he relocated in 1878 to Munich, where he would settle for life. From 1881 to 1885 Stuck attended the Munich Academy.

He first became well known by cartoons for Fliegende Blätter, and vignette designs for programmes and book decoration. In 1889 he exhibited his first paintings at the Munich Glass Palace, winning a gold medal for The Guardian of Paradise.

In 1892 Stuck co-founded the Munich Secession, and also executed his first sculpture, Athlete. The next year he won further acclaim with the critical and public success of what is now his best known work, the painting The Sin. Also during 1893, Stuck was awarded a gold medal for painting at the World's Columbian Exposition in Chicago, and was appointed to a royal professorship. In 1895, he began teaching painting at the Munich Academy.

In 1897 Stuck married an American widow, Mary Lindpainter, and began work designing his own residence and studio, the Villa Stuck. His designs for the villa included everything from layout to interior decorations; for his furniture Stuck received another gold medal at the 1900 Paris World Exposition.

Having attained a high public profile by this time, Stuck was ennobled on December 9, 1905, and would receive further public honours from around Europe during the remainder of his life. He continued to be well respected among young artists as professor at the Munich Academy, even after his artistic styles became unfashionable. His students over the years included Paul Klee, Hans Purrmann, Wassily Kandinsky, Alf Bayrle and Josef Albers.

He was a member of the International Society of Sculptors, Painters and Gravers. His work was also part of the sculpture event in the art competition at the 1928 Summer Olympics.

Franz von Stuck died on August 30, 1928, in Munich; his funeral address memorialized him as "the last prince of art of Munich's great days". He is buried in the Munich Waldfriedhof next to his wife Mary.

== Style ==
Stuck's subject matter was primarily from mythology, inspired by the work of Arnold Böcklin. Large forms dominate most of his paintings and indicate his proclivities for sculpture. His seductive female nudes are a prime example of popular Symbolist content. Stuck paid much attention to the frames for his paintings and generally designed them himself with such careful use of panels, gilt carving and inscriptions that the frames must be considered as an integral part of the overall piece.

Stuck's Kämpfende Amazone (Fighting Amazon), created in 1897, graced Hermann Göring's Carinhall.

== Legacy ==
By the time of his death, Stuck's importance as an artist in his own right had almost been forgotten: his art seemed old-fashioned and irrelevant to a generation that had endured World War I. Stuck's reputation languished until the late 1960s when a renewed interest in Art Nouveau brought him to attention once more. In 1968 the Villa Stuck was opened to the public; it is now a museum.

In Robert Waite's 1977 book The Psychopathic God: Adolf Hitler and numerous other sources it is noted that Franz Stuck was Hitler's favorite painter from childhood on.

Stuck's paintings were mentioned by Carl Jung, who wrote:

... Franz Stuck, whose snake-pictures bear significant titles like Vice, Sin, or Lust (see plate x). The mixture of anxiety and lust is perfectly expressed in the sultry atmosphere of these pictures,...

== Gallery ==
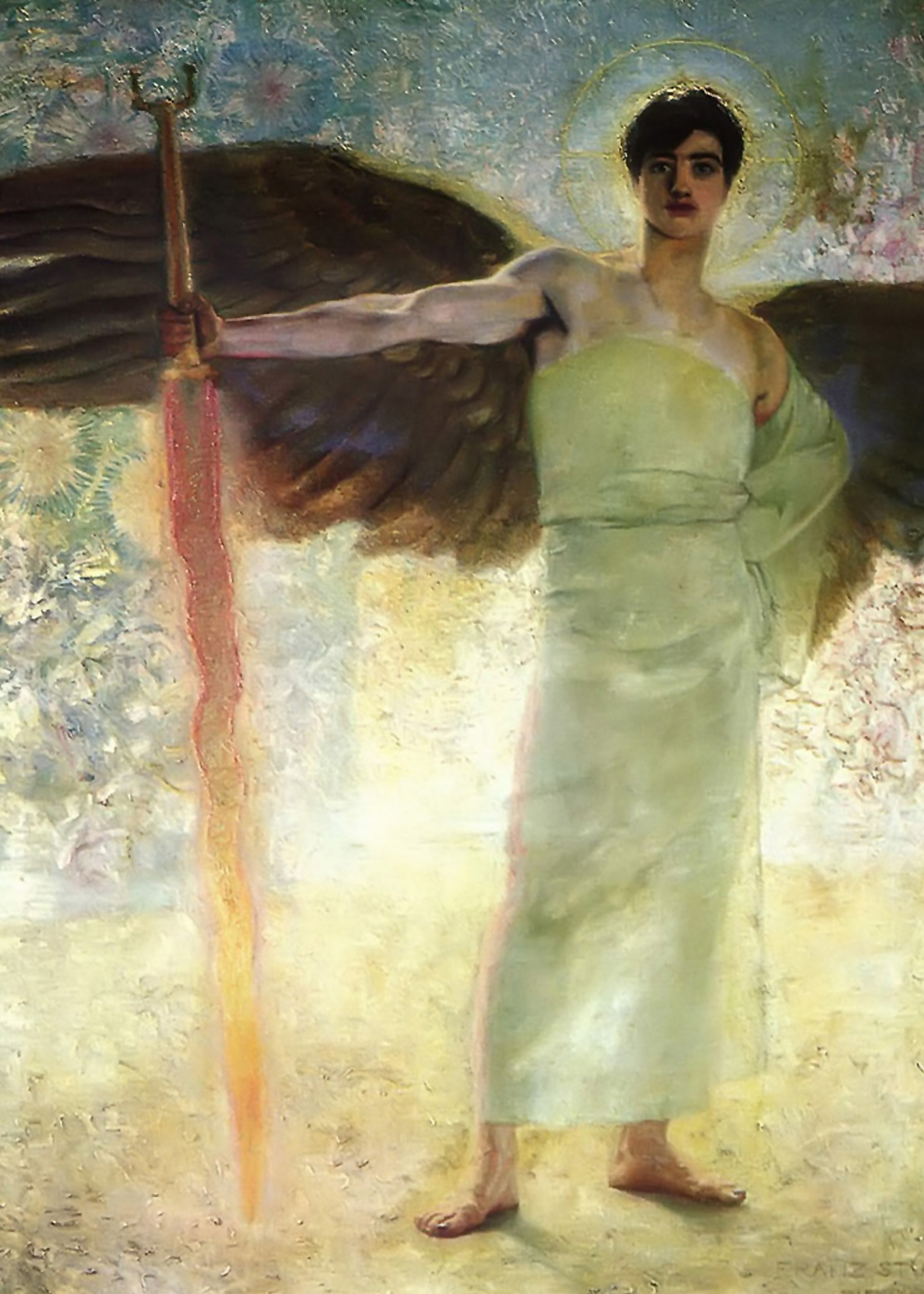
The Guardian of Paradise, 1889

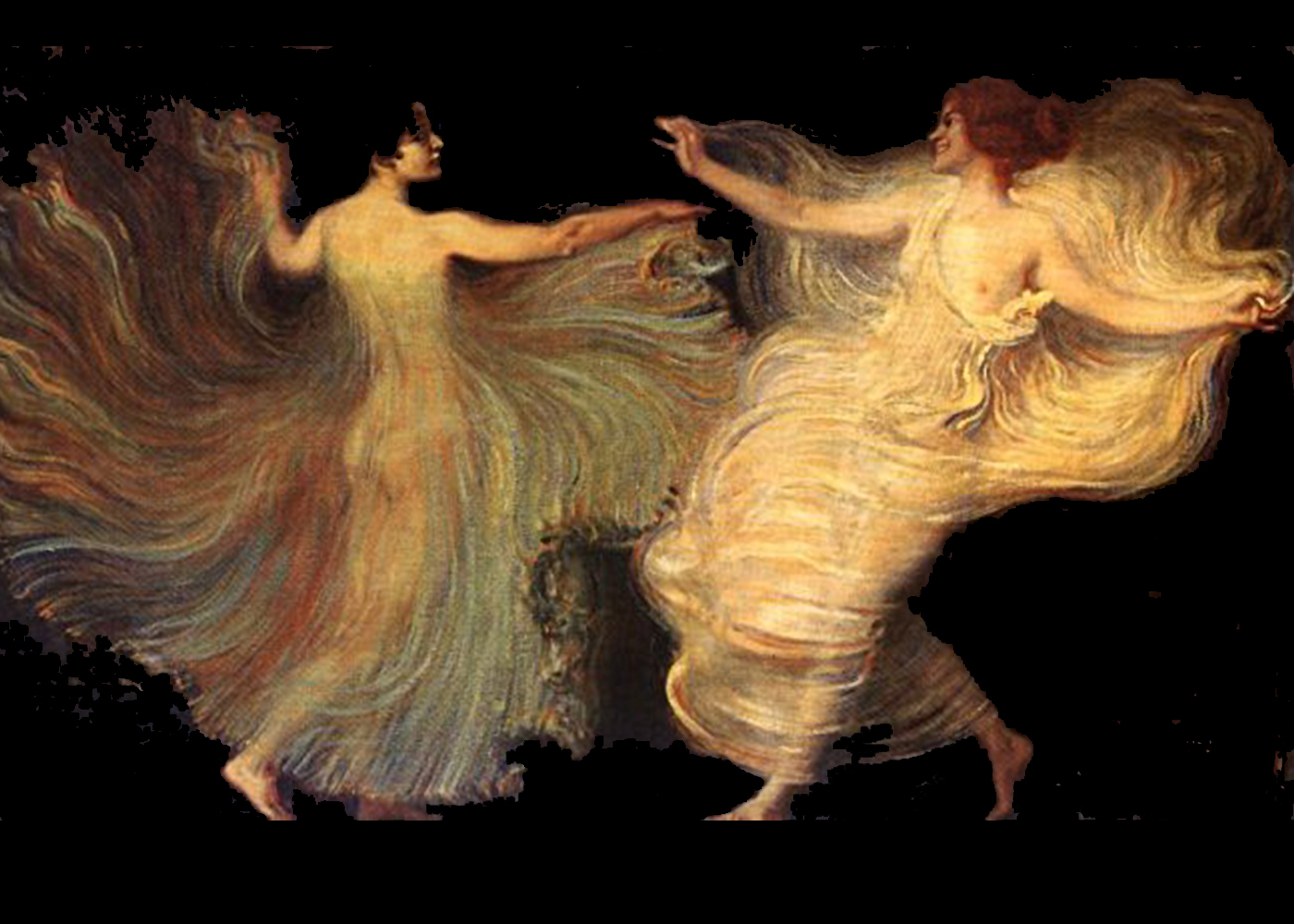
Dancers, 1896

Amazon, 1897

Paradise Lost, 1897

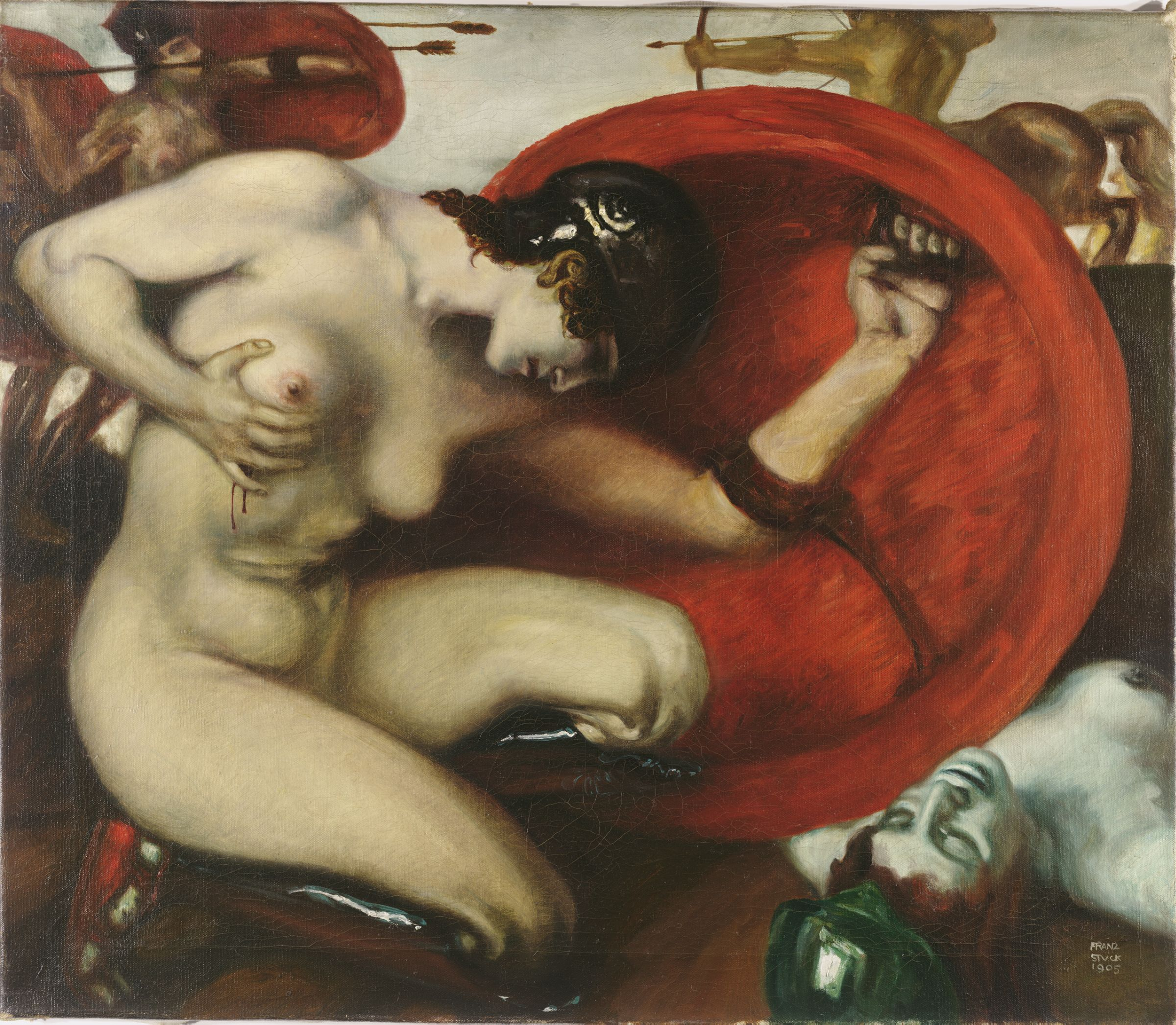
Wounded Amazon, 1903

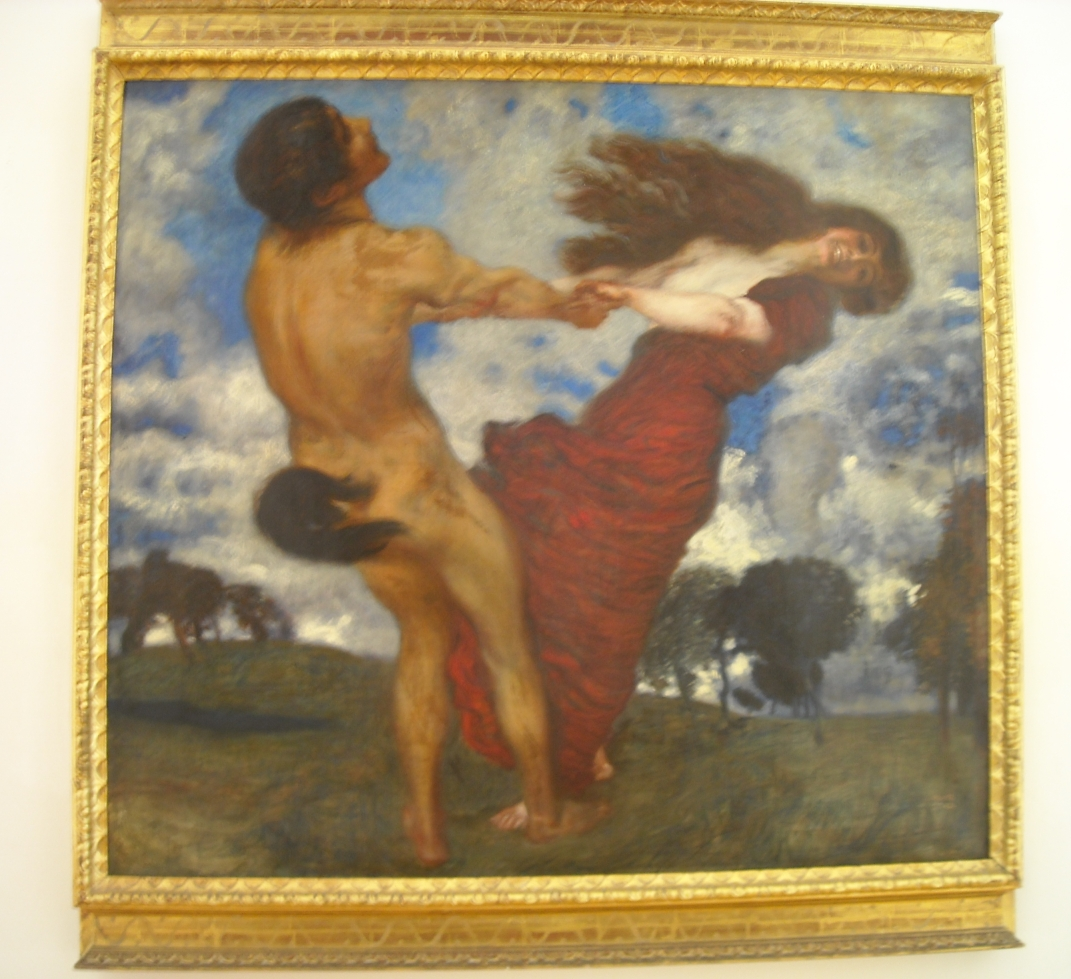
Ringeltanz, 1905

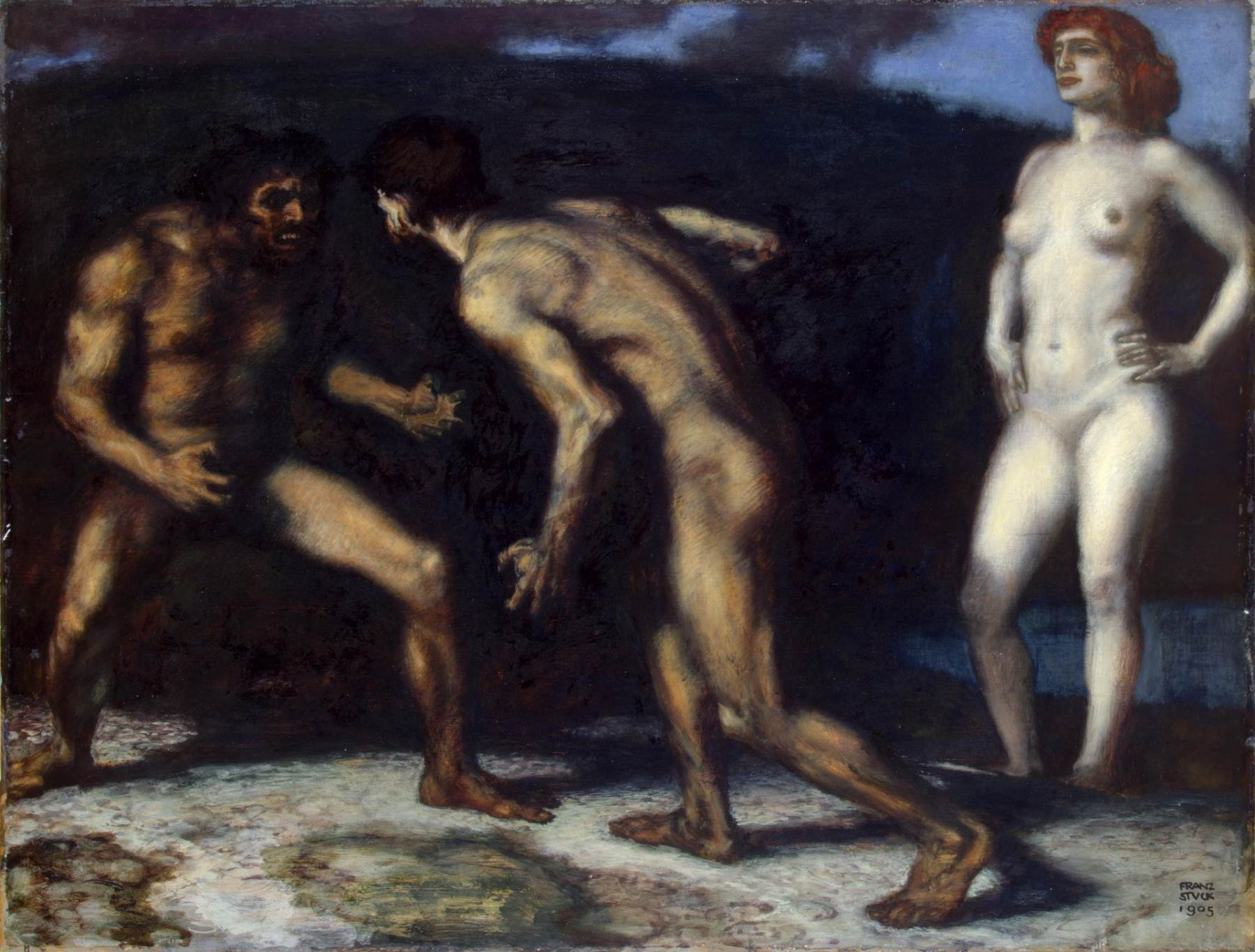
The Struggle for Woman, 1905

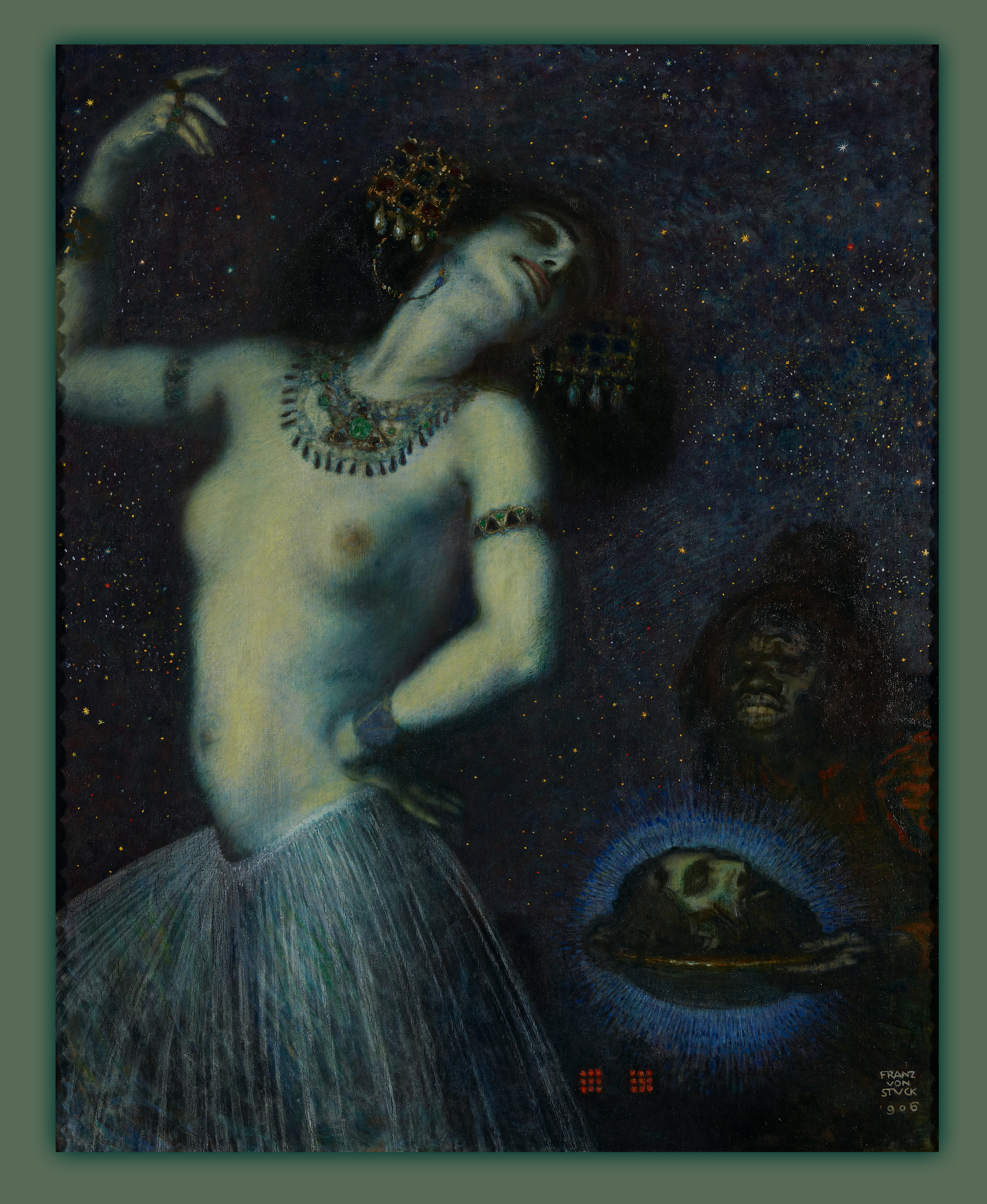
Salome, 1906

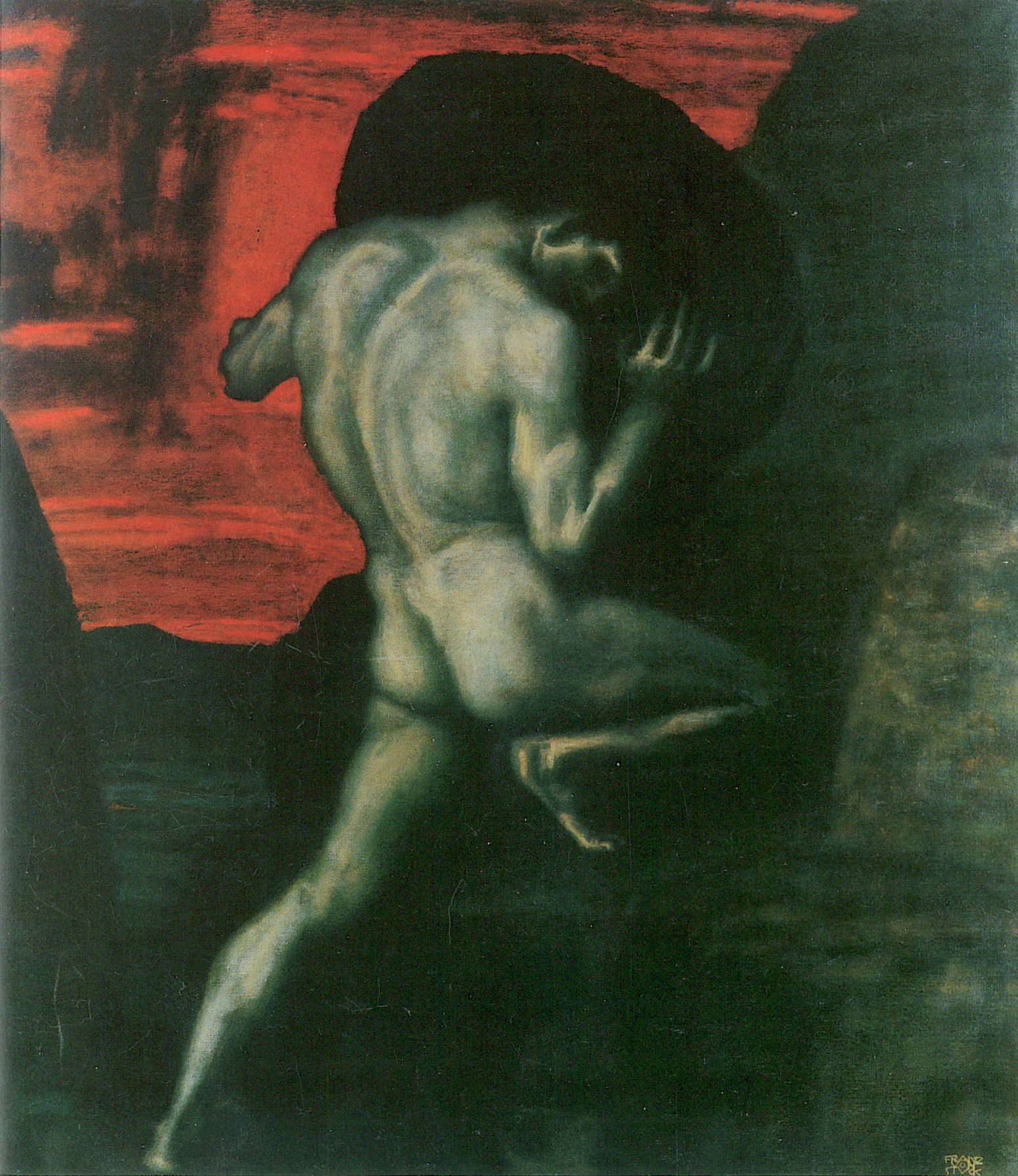
Sisyphus, 1920

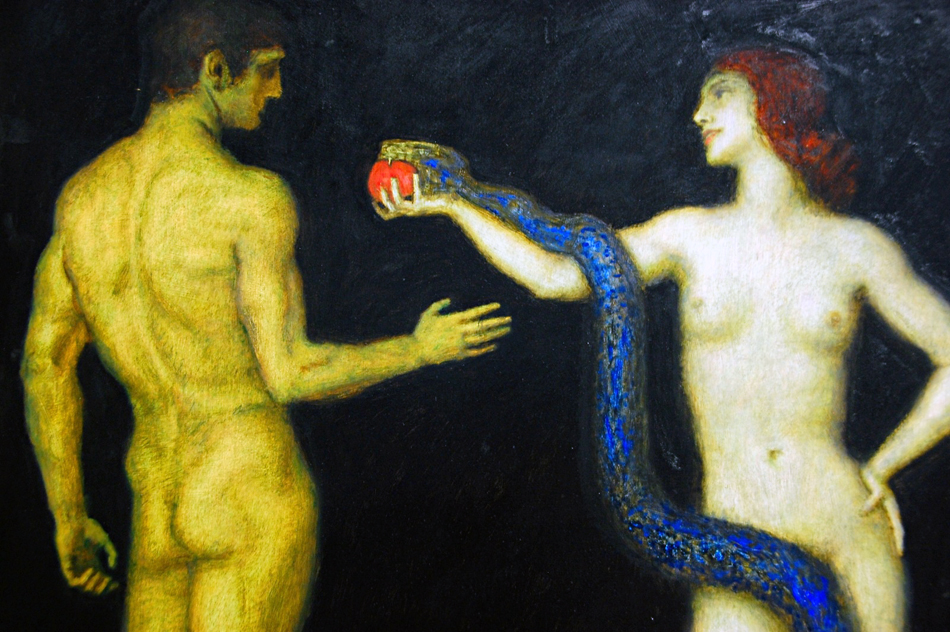
Adam and Eve, 1920

Tilla Durieux as Circe, c.1913

== Bibliography ==
- Adam, Peter. Art of the Third Reich. New York City: Harry N. Abrams. 1992. ISBN 0-8109-2615-6.
- Gibson, Michael. Symbolism. Cologne: Benedikit Taschen Verlag. 1995. ISBN 3-8228-9324-2.
- Mendgen, Eva. Von Stuck. Cologne: Benedikt Taschen Verlag. 1995. ISBN 3-8228-8888-5.
