= Salomé (Moretto) =

Painting by Moretto da Brescia

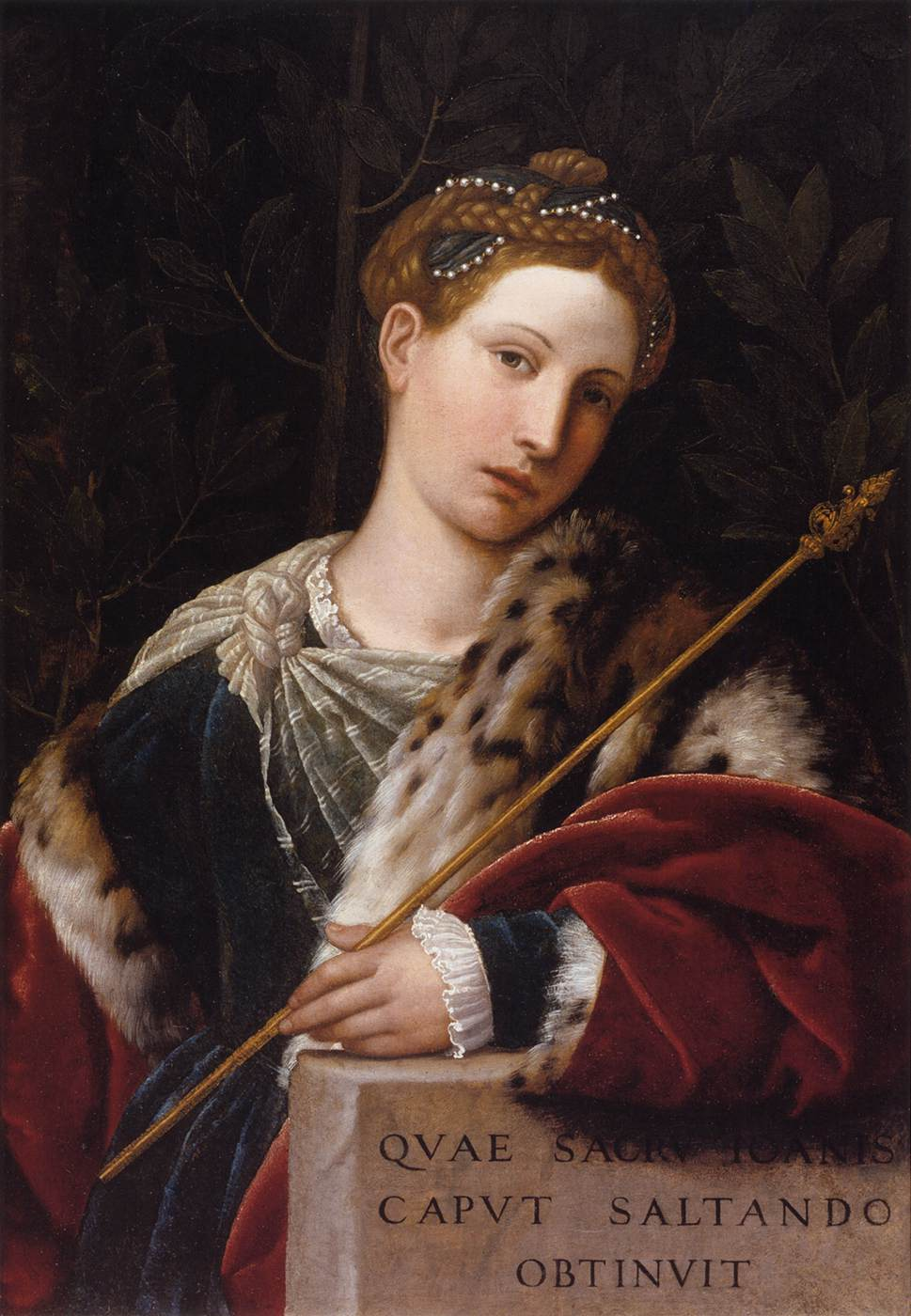
- Artist: Moretto da Brescia
- Year: c. 1540
- Medium: oil on canvas
- Dimensions: 56 cm × 39 cm (22 in × 15 in)
- Location: Pinacoteca Tosio Martinengo; Brescia

Salomé (also Tullia d'Aragona or Tullia d'Aragona as Salomé) is an oil painting on canvas, by Moretto da Brescia, executed c. 1540. It is kept in the collection of the Pinacoteca Tosio Martinengo in Brescia.

The work's connection with the historical character of Tullia d'Aragona is unknown. According to critics, the painting inaugurates the late production of the artist, where Moretto is much freer in composition and colors than previous works, in the style of Titian.

== History ==
The original patron of the painting is unknown, and it appears for the first time in historical documents in a 19th-century inventory of Count Teodoro Lechi, reported under the title Herodias with fur and a wand in his hand. He then transferred it to other owners, in Brescia, and on 20 July 1814 it was used in exchange to obtain the Baptism of Saint Catherine by Paolo Veronese. The painting was then bought by Count Paolo Tosio in 1829 and along with the rest of his collection entered the Pinacoteca Tosio Martinengo in 1846.

The painting has been restored in 1986, and the operation has freed the painted surface from previous fillings, recovering almost completely the brilliance of the original color scheme.

== Description and style ==
The painting depicts Salome dressed in expensive clothes and a rich fur, laying a golden scepter in her left hand. Long hair is twisted together with a green veil and pearl strands. The figure of the woman seems to rest on a marble plaque placed in the foreground, over which, in black characters, there is the inscription "QVAE SACRV[M] IOANIS CAPVT SALTANDO OBTINVIT". The background depicts laurel trees.

In the 19th century, critics often identified the painting's subject as Herodias, but the youth of the figure and the inscription on the tombstone (which can be translated as "She who obtained the head of Saint John by dancing") indicate Herodias' daughter, Salome.

In several sources, the subject is believed to be a portrait of Tullia d'Aragona. This belief does not have critical or historical foundation, and it comes from an 1886 essay by Guido Biagi. Biagi argued that this was a common identification, although he was mistaken.

== Bibliography ==
- Guido Biagi, Un'etéra romana, in "Nuova antologia di scienze, lettere e arti", vol.4, fasc.16, 1886
- Rossana Bossaglia, La pittura bresciana del Cinquecento. I maggiori e i loro scolari in AA.VV., Storia di Brescia, Treccani, Brescia 1963
- Pietro Da Ponte, L'opera del Moretto, Brescia 1898
- Pompeo Molmenti, Il Moretto da Brescia, Firenze 1898
- Fausto Lechi, Gaetano Panazza, La pittura bresciana del Rinascimento, catalogo della mostra, Bergamo 1939
- Pier Virgilio Begni Redona, Alessandro Bonvicino - Il Moretto da Brescia, Editrice La Scuola, Brescia 1988
- Adolfo Venturi, Storia dell'arte italiana, volume IX, La pittura del Cinquecento, Milano 1929
