= Kawther Salam =

Palestinian journalist from Hebron

Kawther Salam is a Palestinian journalist from Hebron. She has worked for Al-Ittihad, al-Hayat al-Jadida, and Al-Quds Al-Arabi. The Israeli organization, Gush Shalom, published a weekly diary of her experiences in Hebron on its website. She also collaborated on three films for Israeli television stations. Salam reported on human rights abuses by the Israeli military, naming particular soldiers, and filing legal complaints against them; she also lists Jewish settler activists alongside soldiers on her website as "terrorists."

She claims she has been attacked by Israeli soldiers on several occasions and filed a lawsuit after one incident where her arm was broken. Two incidents of abuse towards Salam were documented in the 2001 Human Rights Watch report, Center of the Storm: a Case Study of Human Rights Abuses in Hebron District. Following death threats from Israeli military personnel, settlers, and "extreme Muslim findamentalists," she applied for and was granted political asylum in Vienna, Austria on December 5, 2002. The International Press Institute (IPI) and the International Federation of Journalists (IFJ) both intervened on her behalf in her asylum application.

Salam's reports in 2000 on Israeli military corruption led to internal investigations of two Israeli officers. Prior to receiving asylum in Austria, Daniel Seaman, director of the Israel Government Press Office, made it known that Salam would not be allowed to work as a journalist under Israeli jurisdiction. According to the IPI, the only apparent reason for this action was "that she is a Palestinian critical reporter and that the army and the Israeli settlers do not 'recognise' her work." Salam reports, according to the IPI, that "Seaman threatened to have her arrested if she ever came to his office for a renewal of her press card again." Aidan White, General Secretary of the IFJ, personally intervened on Salam's behalf and described the rules under which she was stripped of her press credentials as "completely inappropriate form of apartheid discrimination against all Palestinians."

In 2003, Salam was one of 28 writers in 13 countries to receive a Hellman/Hammett Grant from Human Rights Watch "in recognition of their courage in the face of political persecution."
