= Salome (Stuck) =

Painting by Franz Stuck

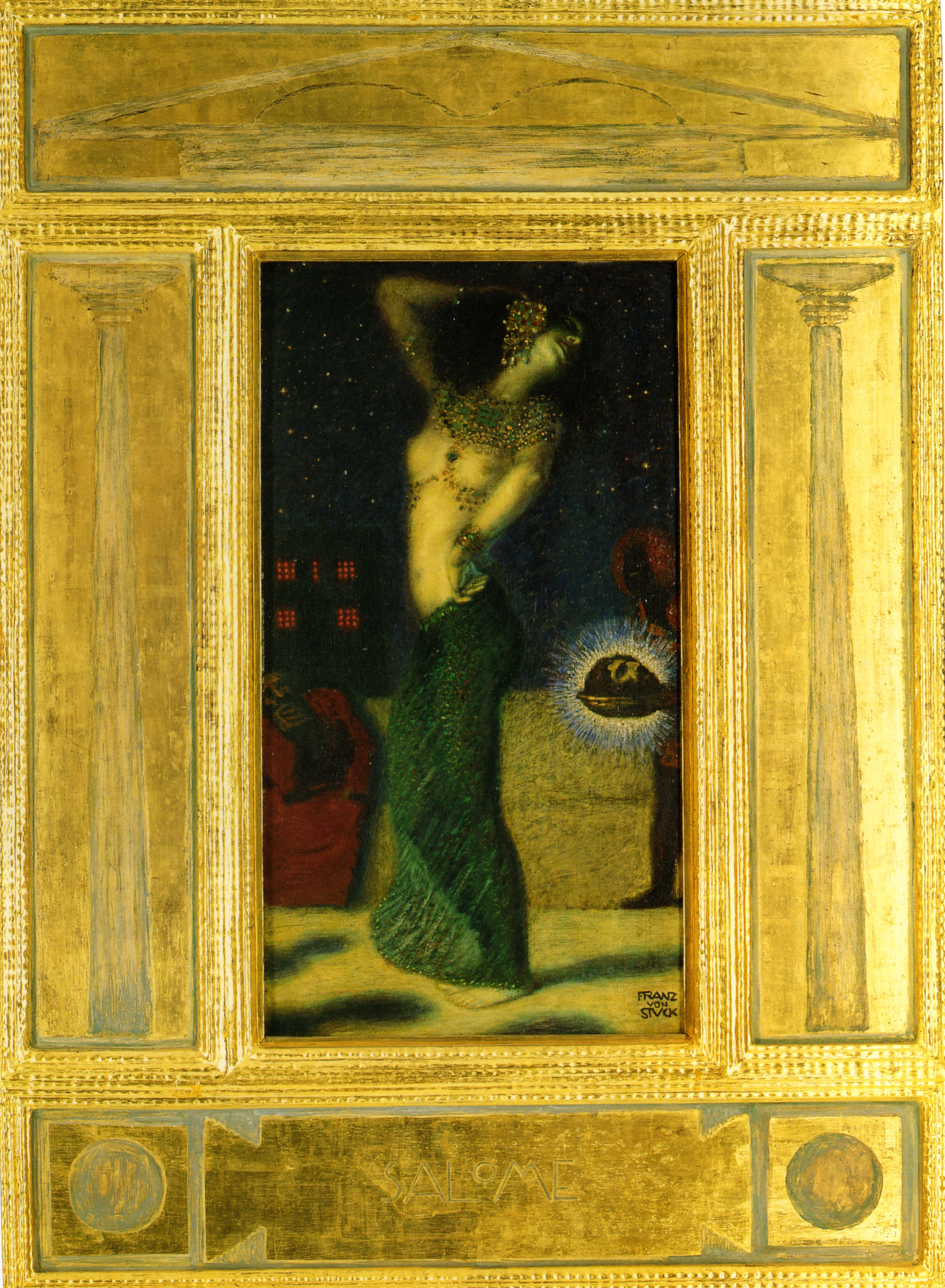
- Artist: Franz von Stuck
- Year: 1906
- Medium: oil on canvas
- Dimensions: 45.7 cm × 24.7 cm (18.0 in × 9.7 in)
- Location: Private collection

Salome
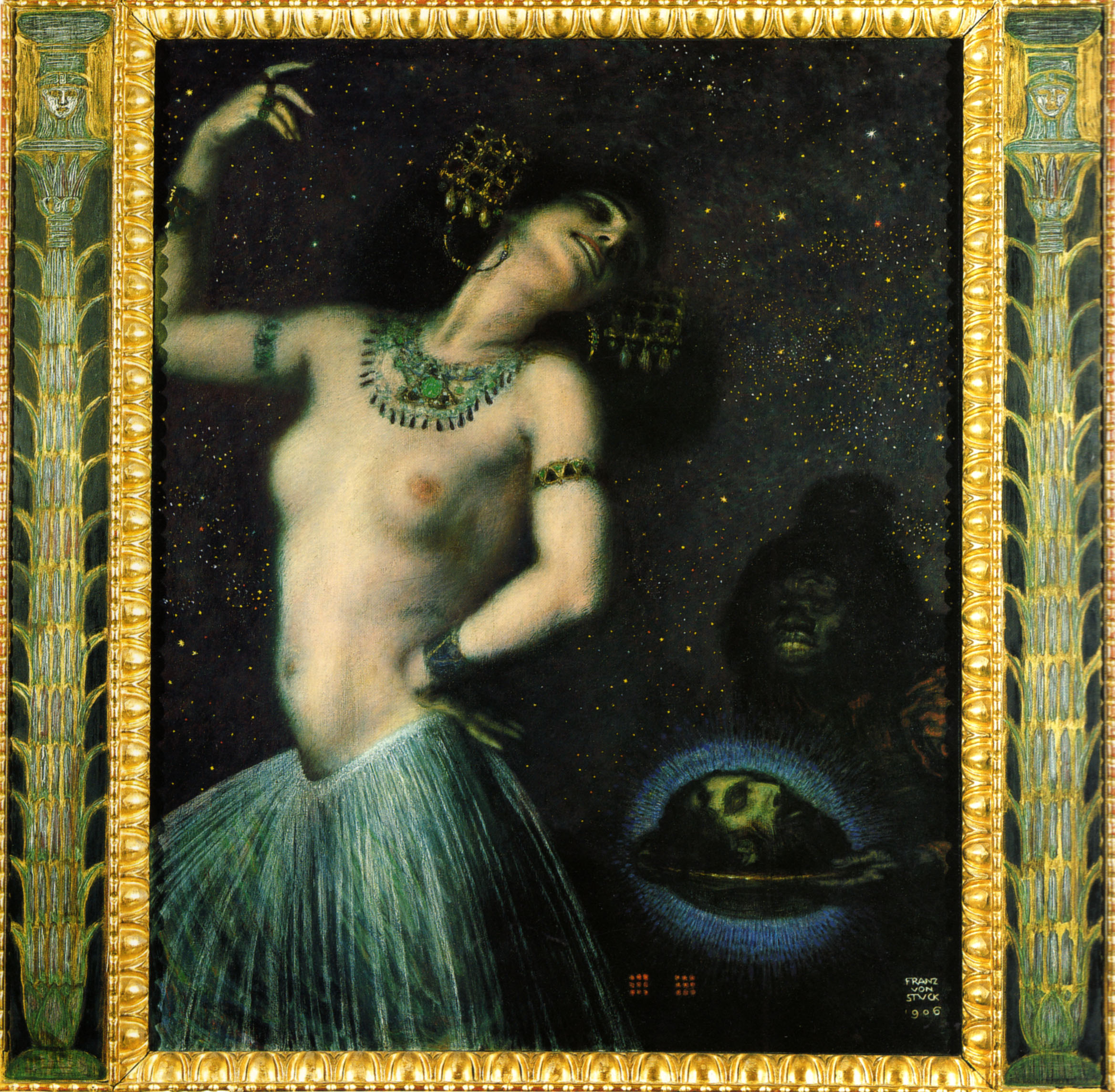
- Artist: Franz von Stuck
- Year: 1906
- Medium: tempera on canvas
- Dimensions: 114.5 cm × 92 cm (45.1 in × 36 in)
- Location: Lenbachhaus, Munich

Salome is the title of two oil on wood paintings by the German artist Franz Stuck, both created in 1906. They depict Salome, daughter of Herod II and Herodias, an historical and biblical figure, dancing with joy as the head of John the Baptist is brought to her by a servant. Stuck was inspired, among other things, by the contemporary play by Oscar Wilde, the focus of which is Salome as a femme fatale.

This painting is part of the BBC's 100 Great Paintings.

== Versions ==
Stuck made three versions of the painting, all completed in 1906. One smaller full-portrait version (45,7 × 24,7 cm) was exhibited at the Galerie Neue Meister in Dresden from 1953 until 1991, when it was reconveyed to the private owner. A larger version (115,5 × 62,5 cm) in a three-quarter view is part of the permanent exhibition at the Städtische Galerie im Lenbachhaus in Munich. The third version belonged to the Hessisches Landesmuseum Darmstadt but was lost in World War II.

== Description ==
The two paintings differ essentially in terms of the image section, the different size and format. The earlier and smaller painting shows Salome as a full portrait, where the bare feet of the dancer and other details of the background can be seen. The larger painting, on the other hand, only shows a section: the dancer is shown in a three-quarter length portrait beginning above the knees. The upper body and face move even further into the center of the picture, while she herself was shifted a little to the left of the center of the picture.

In the center of both paintings, Salome is depicted as a young dancer. The woman's upper body is bare, while the neck, décolleté, hair and arms are adorned with gold jewelry, set with precious stones. A green skirt of light fabric is wrapped around her hips, through which the contours of the hips and legs shine through. In both pictures Salome supports her left arm on her hip. The right arm is raised in each case, with the forearm stretching upwards at a 45-degree angle from the horizontally outstretched upper arm in the large-format painting and the hand falling towards the face in an open gesture, while in the small-format depiction the hand grasps the hair in a more natural position. In both pictures, the head is tilted back over the left shoulder, so that the dancer looks to the side and shows the viewer the chin area.

In both paintings a dark-skinned servant is standing on the left behind the dancer. This figure watches Salome with his head slightly bowed and his eyes fixed. He presents her the severed head of John the Baptist on a golden platter, which is surrounded by a radiant blue halo. This makes it stand out in the painting.

The background consists of a black starry sky with shimmering gold, red and white stars. In the full portrait, the lower area is occupied by a light-colored balustrade, behind which several houses with red-lit windows can be seen, and at the very bottom by the light-colored floor. These elements put the scene in a spatial perspective. On the left edge of the painting another person is shown in front of the parapet. This red-clad person is Herod Antipas, who carefully watches the dancer. Other differences in the images relate to the details of the jewelry and the depiction of the servant.

The frames are also essential elements of the paintings and were both designed by Stuck. The full portrait is completely surrounded by a very wide, golden frame made up of four frames. Columns tapering upwards are depicted on the two side parts, the capitals of which form the upper frame element with the depiction of frieze and gable. Below the picture is the name "SALOME" in an area modeled on an identification plate, as well as square ornaments with a circle on each side. The three-quarter portrait is framed with a narrow golden border and has broader frame elements on the sides, through which the actually rectangular picture forms a square area together with the frame. Columns made of bundles of papyrus are depicted on the side, ending at the top with capitals where the heads of Medusas rest.

== Critical analysis ==
Stuck used photographs as templates for these paintings. He had model posed in the role of Salome, while he himself took on the role of the servant. Stuck already had used photographs for earlier paintings. He already had posed for the photographer, probably with his wife Mary, for the painting Kampf ums Weib (1905) as one of the wrestlers, and for Dissonanz (1910), in the role of Pan.

According to the art critic Hans Hofstätter, "the femme fatale, and especially Salome was the social symbol of the turn of the century and thus the double of the artist, who also knows that he prostitutes himself and reveals his most sacred feelings and secrets cheaply". By posing himself as a model for the figure of the servant, Stuck himself becomes a voyeur in his own painting.
