= Tettenweis =

- Municipality
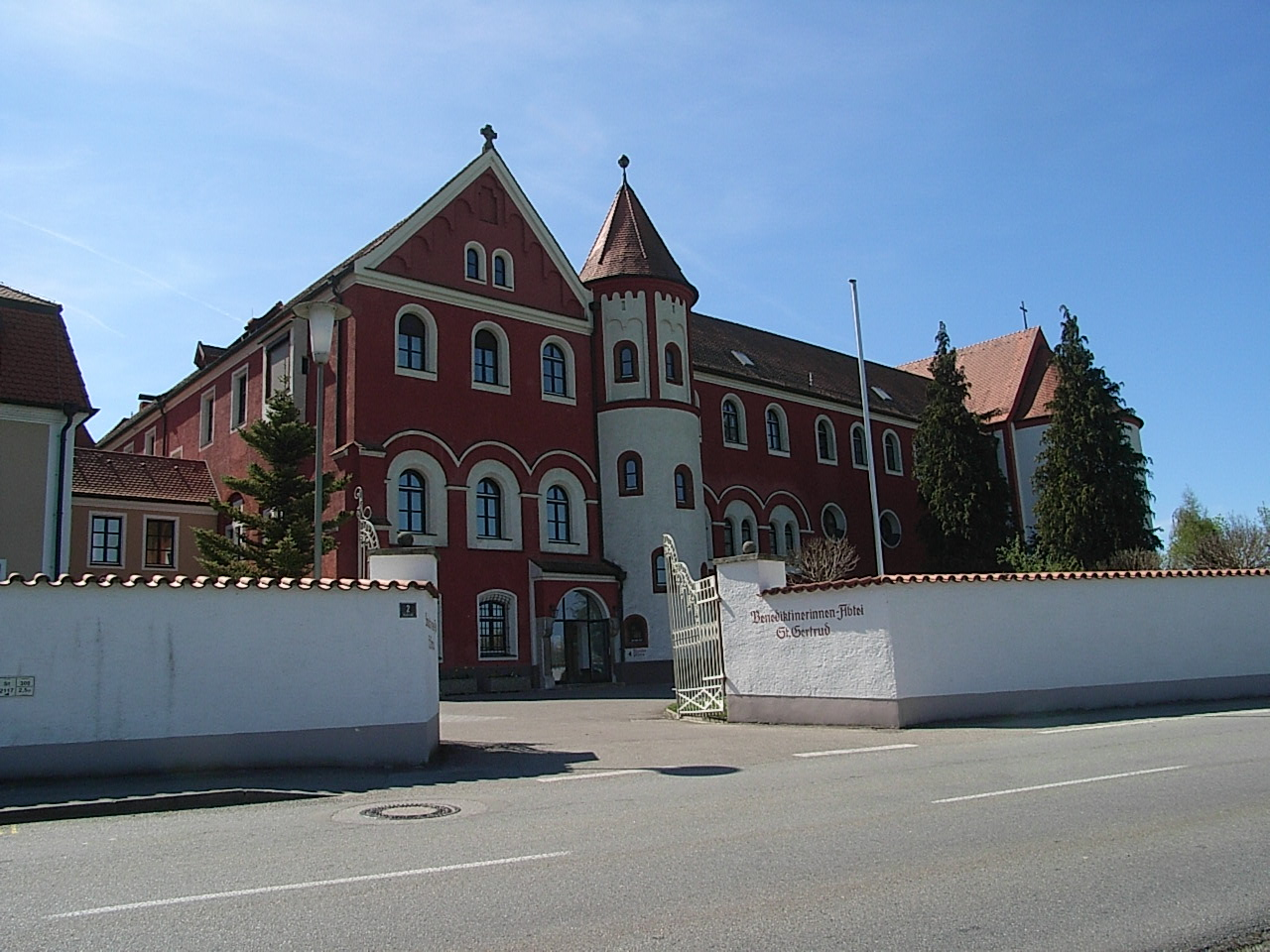
- Kloster Tettenweis

- Coat of arms

- Location of Tettenweis within Passau district
- Interactive map of Tettenweis
- Location within Germany Location within Bavaria
- Coordinates: 48°26′N 13°16′E
- Country: Germany
- State: Bavaria
- Admin. region: Niederbayern
- District: Passau

Government
  - Mayor (2020–26): Robert Stiglmayr

Area
  - Total: 28.7 km^{2} (11.1 sq mi)
- Elevation: 335 m (1,099 ft)

Population (2025-12-31)
  - Total: 1,844
  - Density: 64.3/km^{2} (166/sq mi)
- Time zone: UTC+01:00 (CET)
  - Summer (DST): UTC+02:00 (CEST)
- Postal codes: 94167
- Dialling codes: 08534
- Vehicle registration: PA
- Website: www.tettenweis.de

Tettenweis (German pronunciation: [ˈtɛtn̩vaɪs]) is a municipality in the district of Passau in Bavaria, Germany.
