= Villa Stuck =

Building in Haidhausen, Upper Bavaria, Germany

Coordinates: 48°08′26.36″N 11°35′58.72″E

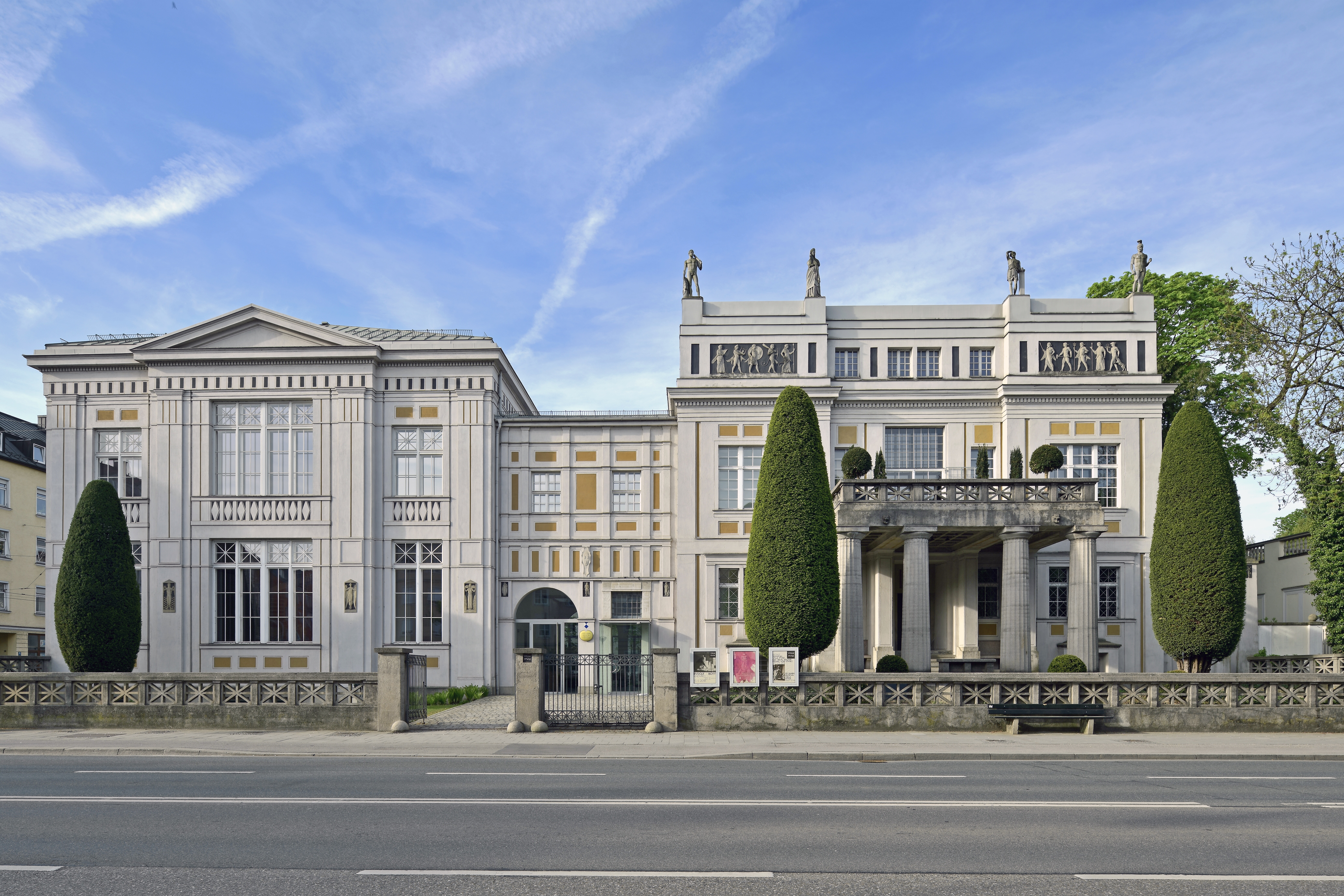
Villa Stuck, 2018

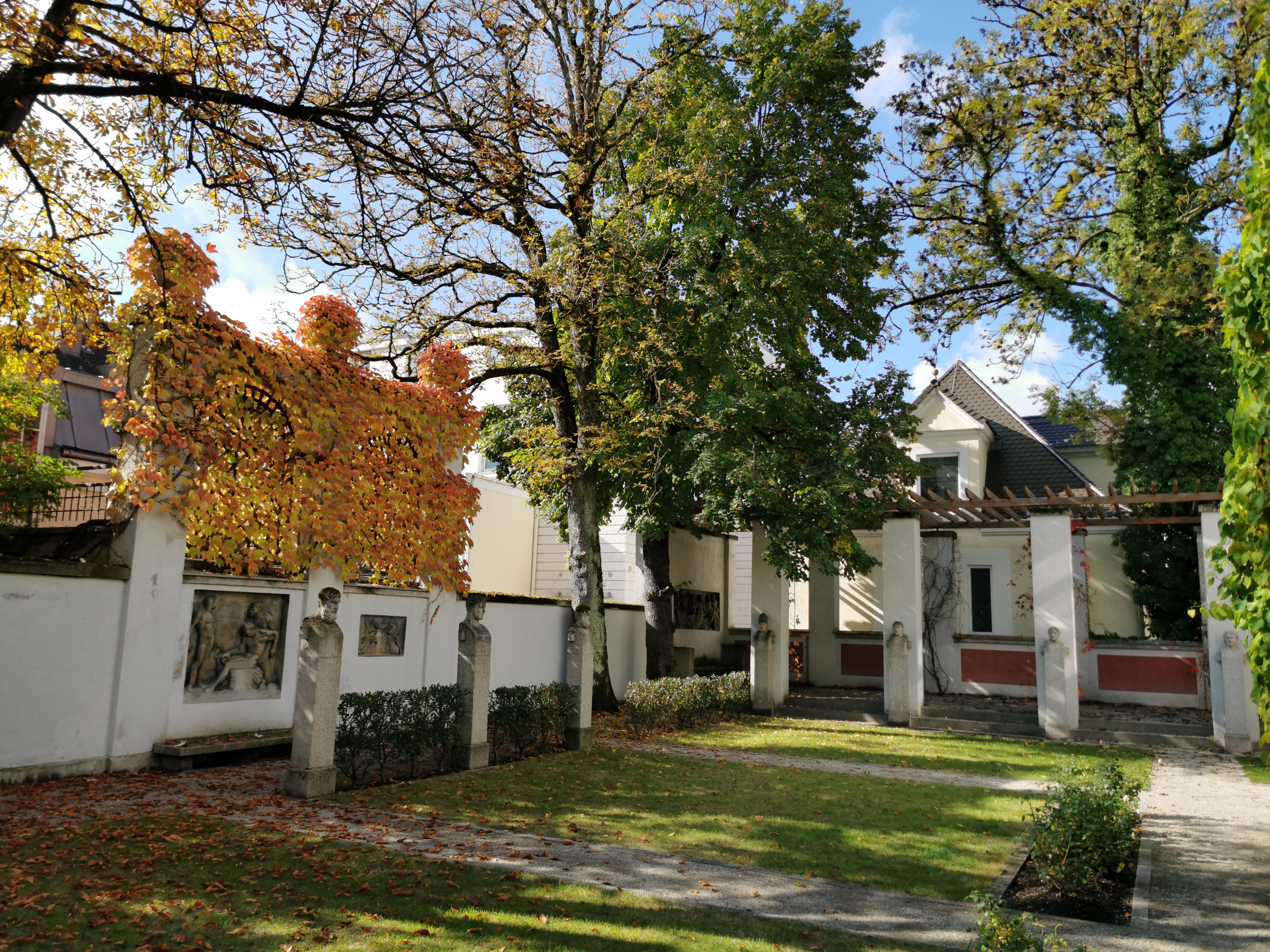
Garden of Villa Stuck, 2020

The Villa Stuck is an art museum located in Munich in the area of Bogenhausen. The building was completed in 1898. In 1992, it was established as a museum and historic house devoted to the life and work of the painter Franz Stuck. In contrast to the Classical architecture of the exterior, Stuck decorated the interior in striking Art Nouveau/Art Deco style.

The museum closed for a period of renovation in the 2020s and reopened in October 2025, following the completion of a €13.5m renovation.

== See also ==
- List of single-artist museums
