= Salaam (disambiguation) =

Salaam is a short form of As-salamu alaykum, an Arabic greeting meaning "Peace be upon you". This phrase and the Arabic word Salām سلام 'peace' derive from the Semitic root Š-L-M.

Salaam or Salam may also refer to:

== Businesses and organizations ==
- Al-Salam SC, several sports teams
- Salaam TV, independent satellite television channel
- Salaam Bank, commercial bank headquartered in Bosaso, Somalia
- Salaam Somali Bank, commercial bank headquartered in Mogadishu, Somalia
- Salam, defunct newspaper in Iran
- Salam Zgharta FC, Lebanese association football club
- Zee Salaam, Indian Hindi- and Urdu-language Islamic TV channel owned by Zee Network

== Music ==
- Salam, film score by Fariborz Lachini
- Salam, song by Alabina
- "Salaam" (song), peace song by Mosh Ben Ari
- Salaam (album), album by Sami Yusuf
- Salam (album), album by Irfan Makki

== People ==
=== Given name ===
- Salaam bin Said Al Shaksy, chief executive
- Salaam Remi, American hip hop record producer

=== Surname ===
- Abd al-Salam (name)
- Anbara Salam, Lebanese writer and activist
- Ephraim Salaam, American football player
- Florin Salam, Romanian manele singer
- Ghazala K. Salam, American Muslim activist and philanthropist
- H. Salam (active from 2021), Indian politician in Kerala
- Kawther Salam, Palestinian journalist
- Mohammed Ahmed Salam, Yemeni prisoner
- Abdul Salam Rocketi, Afghan military personnel
- Nawaf Salam, Lebanese diplomat, academic, jurist
- Rashaan Salaam, American football player
- Salim Ali Salam, Lebanese statesman
- Saeb Salam, Lebanese politician
- Shadi Abdel Salam, Egyptian film director, screenwriter, costume and set designer
- Tammam Salam, Lebanese politician
- Waleed Al-Salam, mathematician

== Places ==
- Salam, Chaharmahal and Bakhtiari, Iran (also known as Salm)
- Salam, Mali
- Salam Street, Abu Dhabi
- Slaim, Suwayda; Ottoman name for this town in Syria

== Other uses ==
- Operation Salam, covert operation during World War II
- Salaam spasms or epileptic spasms, disorder
- Salam leaf or Indonesian bay leaf, leaf of a plant in the family Myrtaceae

== See also ==
- El Salam Maritime Transport
- Lal Salam, salute, greeting or code word used by communists in South Asia
- Salem (disambiguation)
- Salim (disambiguation)
- Selam (Australopithecus), fossil specimen found in Dikika
- Shalom (disambiguation)
