= Salma =

Salma may refer to:

== People ==
- Salma (given name), a list of people
- Happy Salma (born 1980), Indonesian actress
- Salma (writer), pen name of Indian Tamil writer, activist and politician born Rajathi Samsudeen in 1968
- Abu Salma, Palestinian poet and PLO member Abd al-Karim al-Karmi (1909–1980)

== Places ==
- Salma, Nepal, a former village development committee
- Salma, Syria, a village
- Salma Mountains, Saudi Arabia

== Other uses ==
- Salma (moth), a moth genus in the subfamily Epipaschiinae
- Salma Dam, a dam in Afghanistan
- South American land mammal age (SALMA), a geologic timescale term
- Salma (1985 film), an Indian drama musical romance film directed by Ramanand Sagar
- Salma (1960 film), a Pakistani film
- Salma, a 2013 documentary by Kim Longinotto

== See also ==
- Selma (disambiguation)
- Salmas, Iran, a city
