= Shalom =

Hebrew word and greeting

Shalom in Hebrew

Shalom (Hebrew: שָׁלוֹם šālōm) is a Hebrew word meaning peace and can be used idiomatically to mean hello and goodbye.

As it does in English, it can refer to either peace between two entities (especially between a person and God or between two countries), or to the well-being, welfare or safety of an individual or a group of individuals. The word shalom is also found in many other expressions and names. Its equivalent cognate in Arabic is salaam, sliem in Maltese, Shlama in Neo-Aramaic dialects, and sälam in Ethiopian Semitic languages from the Proto-Semitic root Š-L-M.

== Etymology ==
In Hebrew, words are built on "roots", generally of three consonants. When the root consonants appear with various vowels and additional letters, a variety of words, often with some relation in meaning, can be formed from a single root. Thus from the root sh-l-m come the words shalom ("peace, well-being"), hishtalem ("it was worth it"), shulam ("was paid for"), meshulam ("paid for in advance"), mushlam ("perfect"), and shalem ("whole").

Biblically, shalom is seen in reference to the well-being of others (Genesis 43:27, Exodus 4:18), to treaties (I Kings 5:12), and in prayer for the wellbeing of cities or nations (Psalm 122:6, Jeremiah 29:7).

The meaning of completeness, central to the term shalom, can also be confirmed in related terms found in other Semitic languages. The Assyrian term salamu means to be complete, unharmed, paid/atoned. Sulmu, another Assyrian term, means welfare. A closer relation to the idea of shalom as a concept and action is seen in the Arabic root salaam, meaning, among other things, to be safe, secure and forgiven.

== In expressions ==
The word "shalom" can be used for all parts of speech; as a noun, adjective, verb, adverb, and interjection. It categorizes all shaloms. The word shalom is used in a variety of expressions and contexts in Hebrew speech and writing:

- Shalom by itself is a very common abbreviation and it is used in Modern Israeli Hebrew as a greeting and farewell. In this way, it is similar to the Hawaiian aloha, the Korean annyeong, the Persian dorud (bedrud), the Indian namaste, the Italian ciao and the Vietnamese chào (a false cognate of ciao; the two words are not linguistically related despite sounding similar to each other).
- Shalom aleichem (שָׁלוֹם עֲלֵיכֶם; "well-being be upon you" or "may you be well"), this expression is used to greet others and is a Hebrew equivalent of "hello". The appropriate response to such a greeting is "upon you be well-being" ( עֲלֵיכֶם שָׁלוֹם, aleichem shalom). This is a cognate of the Arabic assalamu alaikum. On the eve of Shabbat, Jews have a custom of singing a song which is called Shalom Alecheim, before the Kiddush over wine of the Shabbat dinner is recited.
  - In the Gospels, Jesus often uses the greeting "Peace be unto you" (e.g., Matthew 10:12), a translation of shalom aleichem. See Pax (liturgy).
- Shabbat shalom (שַׁבָּת שָׁלוֹם; "peaceful Sabbath") is a common greeting used on Shabbat. This is most prominent in areas with Mizrahi, Sephardi, or modern Israeli influence. Many Ashkenazi communities in the Jewish diaspora use Yiddish Gut shabbes in preference or interchangeably.
- Ma sh'lom'cha (מַה שְׁלוֹמְךָ; "What is your well-being/peace?") is a Hebrew equivalent of the English "how are you?".
- Alav hashalom (עָלָיו הַשָּׁלוֹם; "upon him is peace") is a phrase used in some Jewish communities, especially Ashkenazi ones, after mentioning the name of a deceased respected individual.
- Oseh shalom (עוֹשֶׂה שָׁלוֹם; "Peace-Maker") is the part of a passage commonly found as a concluding sentence in much Jewish liturgy (including the birkat hamazon, kaddish and personal amidah prayers).

== Jewish religious principle ==
In Judaism, shalom is one of the underlying principles of the Torah: "Her ways are pleasant ways and all her paths are shalom". The Talmud explains, "The entire Torah is for the sake of the ways of shalom". Maimonides comments in his Mishneh Torah: "Great is peace, as the whole Torah was given in order to promote peace in the world, as it is stated, 'Her ways are pleasant ways and all her paths are peace'".

In the book Not the Way It's Supposed to Be: A Breviary of Sin, Christian author Cornelius Plantinga described the biblical concept of shalom:

The webbing together of God, humans, and all creation in justice, fulfillment, and delight is what the Hebrew prophets call shalom. We call it peace but it means far more than mere peace of mind or a cease-fire between enemies. In the Bible, shalom means universal flourishing, wholeness and delight – a rich state of affairs in which natural needs are satisfied and natural gifts fruitfully employed, a state of affairs that inspires joyful wonder as its Creator and Savior opens doors and welcomes the creatures in whom he delights. Shalom, in other words, is the way things ought to be.

== Use as name ==
=== Name for God ===
The Talmud says, "the name of God is 'Peace'", therefore, one is not permitted to greet another with the word 'shalom' in places such as a bathroom.

Biblical references lead some Christians to teach that "Shalom" is one of the sacred names of God.

=== Name for people ===
Shalom is also a Hebrew name, found commonly in Israel as both a given and family name. While traditionally masculine, it is occasionally androgynous, such as in the case of model Shalom Harlow.

- Related male names include Shlomo (common variation: Solomon) and Shlomi.
- Related female names include Shulamit, Shulamith, Shlomtzion or Shlomzion and Salome and Shlomith.
- Sholem Aleichem was the pseudonym of Shalom Rabinowitz, whose work Tevye and his Daughters formed the basis for Fiddler on the Roof.

=== Name of organizations ===
Shalom can be part of an organization's name, including the titles of the following establishments promoting Israeli-Arab peace:

- Brit Tzedek v'Shalom
- Brit Shalom
- Gush Shalom
- Hevel Shalom
- Neve Shalom
- Shalom Achshav
- Shalom Sesame

=== Name of synagogues or structures ===
Shalom is used in Jewish religious contexts, such as the names of synagogues and parks, including:

- Beth Shalom
- Neve Shalom Synagogue in Istanbul, Turkey
- Shalom Park in Charlotte, North Carolina and Denver, Colorado
- Shalom Meir Tower in Tel Aviv, Israel
- Valley Beth Shalom in Encino, California

=== Name of events ===
- The 1982 Lebanon War is known in Hebrew as Milchemet Shlom Hagalil (Hebrew: מלחמת שלום הגליל), which means in English, "The War for the Shalom (or Well-Being) of the Galilee".

=== Other ===
- SS Shalom, an ocean liner operated by Zim Lines, Israel 1964–1967.
- Shalom (newspaper), a Jewish newspaper established in Tehran, Iran in 1915
- Şalom is a Jewish weekly newspaper published in Istanbul, Turkey in Turkish, with one page in Ladino (Judaeo-Spanish). (The Turkish letter ş is pronounced /ʃ/, like English sh or Hebrew ש.)
- "Shalom" is a song by Voltaire, on the CD The Devil's Bris.
- "Shalom" is a song by THePETEBOX.

== See also ==
- Aloha
- Ciao
- Greeting
- Inner peace
- Mahalo
- Namaste
- Peace has a similar meaning
- Š-L-M
- Salaam/Od Yavo Shalom Aleinu, song of Mosh Ben-Ari
- Salute

== Sources ==
- Eirene, A Greek-English Lexicon of the New Testament and other Early Christian Literature (Chicago, IL: University of Chicago Press, 2000).
- Eirene, shalóm, and shalám, Nueva Concordancia Strong Exhaustiva (Miami, FL: Editorial Caribe, 2002).
- Eirene, shalom, and shalam, The New Strong's Exhaustive Concordance of the Bible (Nashville, TN: Thomas Nelson Publishers, 1990).
- Paz, Diccionario de la Lengua Española (Madrid, Spain: Real Academia Española, 2001).
- Paz, Nuevo Diccionario Bíblico (Downers Grove, IL: Ediciones Certeza, 1991).
- Shalom, The Brown-Driver-Briggs Hebrew and English Lexicon (Peabody, MA: Hendrickson Publishers, 2003)
