= Shulamith =

Shulamis (Hebrew: שולמית) or Shulamit is the feminine form of the Hebrew name Solomon (in Hebrew, "Shlomo", Hebrew: שְלמה), related to the word "shalom" (Hebrew: שָׁלוֹם), or "peace". "Shula" is a shortened form. The name Salome is also a related form.

== Notable people ==
- Shulamite, the name ascribed to the female protagonist in the Song of Songs in the Hebrew Bible
- Shulamit Aloni (1928–2014), Israeli politician and left-wing activist
- Shulamith Firestone, Canadian-American radical feminist writer and activist
- Shulamit Goldstein (born 1968), Israeli Olympic rhythmic gymnast
- Shulamith Hareven
- Shulamit Katznelson, Israeli educator
- Shulamith Koenig (1930–2021), Israeli human rights activist and educator
- Shulamith Muller, South African activist
- Shulamith Nardi, American-Israeli editor, translator, speaker
- Shulamit Ran, Israeli-American composer
- Shulamith Shahar, Israeli historian
- Shulamit Shalit, Israeli writer, journalist and essayist
- Shulamit Volkov, Israeli historian

== See also ==
- Sulamith
- Shlomit (given name) (Shlomit, Shlomith, Shelomith or Shelomit)
- Shulamite (disambiguation)
