= Beth Shalom =

Beth Shalom or Beth Sholom (Hebrew: בית שלום "house of peace") may refer to:

== Synagogues ==
=== Canada ===
- Beth Shalom Synagogue (Edmonton), Alberta
- Temple Emanu-El-Beth Sholom (Montreal, Quebec)

=== Cuba ===
- Beth Shalom Temple (Havana, Cuba)

=== Greece ===
- Beth Shalom Synagogue (Athens)

=== New Zealand ===
- Beth Shalom (Auckland)

=== United Kingdom ===
- Beth Shalom Reform Synagogue (Cambridge)

=== United States ===
==== California ====
- Congregation Beth Sholom (San Francisco, California)
- Valley Beth Shalom (Encino, California)

==== Connecticut ====
- Beth Shalom Rodfe Zedek (Chester, Connecticut)

==== Florida ====
- Temple Beth Sholom (Miami Beach, Florida)

==== Illinois ====
- Beth Shalom B'nai Zaken Ethiopian Hebrew Congregation (Chicago, Illinois)

==== Iowa ====
- Beit Shalom Jewish Community (Davenport, Iowa)

==== Maryland ====
- Beth Shalom Congregation (Columbia, Maryland)
- Beth Sholom Congregation (Frederick, Maryland)
- Beth Sholom Congregation and Talmud Torah (Potomac, Maryland)

==== Michigan ====
- Temple Beth Sholom (Marquette, Michigan)

==== New Jersey ====
- Temple Beth Sholom (Cherry Hill, New Jersey)

==== New York ====
- Congregation Beth Shalom (Clifton Park, New York)
- Temple Beth Sholom (Roslyn, New York)

==== Pennsylvania ====
- Beth Sholom Congregation (Elkins Park, Pennsylvania)
- Congregation Beth Shalom (Pittsburgh, Pennsylvania)

==== Rhode Island ====
- Congregation Beth Sholom (Providence, Rhode Island)

== Other ==
- Beth Shalom Holocaust Centre (Nottinghamshire, United Kingdom)
