= Shulamite (disambiguation) =

Shulamite is a biblical character from the Song of Songs, the lover of King Solomon.

Shulamite may also refer to:

- The Shulamite (novel), a 1904 novel by Alice Askew
- The Shulamite (play), a 1906 stageplay by Edward Knoblock, based on the novel
- The Shulamite (film), a 1915 British silent film, based on the stageplay
- (French spelling of the name) La Sulamite (musical)

== See also ==
- Sulamitis, an asteroid named after the biblical character The Shulamite
- Sulamitis family, asteroid family named after the asteroid Sulamitis named after the biblical character The Shulamite
- Shulamith (disambiguation)
- Shlomit (given name) (Shlomit, Shlomith, Shelomith or Shelomit)
