= Shalit =

Shallit, Shalit (/ʃəˈliːt/; Hebrew: שַׁלִּיט šallīt "ruler"), also transliterated as Schalit or Schallit, is a Hebrew-language surname. Notable people with the surname include:

- Abraham Schalit (1898–1979), Galician-Israeli historian
- Amos de-Shalit (1926–1969), Israeli nuclear physicist
- Gene Shalit (1926–2026), American film critic
- Gilad Shalit (born 1986), Israeli soldier captured by Hamas
- Heinrich Schalit (1886–1976), Jewish Austrian-American musician and composer
- Jean Schalit (1937–2020), French journalist
- Joseph Shalit Riqueti (17th century), Israeli-Italian rabbi
- Jeffrey Shallit (born 1957), American computer scientist, number theorist
- Joseph Shallit (1915–1995), American mystery novelist and science fiction author
- Moshe Shalit (1885–1941), researcher, journalist, essayist, ethnographer, and humanist
- Paula Szalit (1886 or 1887–1920), Polish pianist
- Ruth Shalit (born 1971), American journalist
- Shulamit Shalit, Israeli writer and essayist
- Wendy Shalit (born 1975), American author
- Willa Shalit (born 1955), American artist
