= Alla Pavlova =

Russian composer of Ukrainian origin (born 1952)

Alla Yevgenyevna Pavlova (Note: Russian: Алла Евгеньевна Павлова, romanized: Alla Yevgenyevna Pavlova; Ukrainian: Алла Євгенівна Павлова, romanized: Alla Yevhenivna Pavlova) (born July 13, 1952, in Ukraine) is a Russian composer. Pavlova was born and initially raised in Vinnytsia, Ukraine. She and her family moved to Moscow in 1961, and she then moved to Brooklyn, New York in 1990, where she has settled. She is best known for her symphonic work.

== Biography ==
=== Soviet life ===
During the Soviet era, the Pavlova family was transferred to Moscow in 1961. There Alla received her bachelor's degree in 1975 from the Ippolitov–Ivanov Music Institute, and in 1983 her master's degree from the Gnessin State Musical College. She studied with Armen Shakhbagyan, a composer with a reputation established in the 1970s, and paid special attention to the works of Anna Akhmatova. This influenced a good part of her output until the 1990s.

Following the achievement of her master's in 1983, Pavlova moved to the Bulgarian capital of Sofia, where she worked at the Union of Bulgarian Composers and the Bulgarian National Opera. She returned to Moscow three years later.

From 1986, Pavlova worked for the Russian Musical Society Board in Moscow, before relocating in 1990 to New York City.

=== American life ===
==== Lieder and chamber music ====
Following her arrival in New York, Pavlova compiled a collection for her daughter Irene consisting of simple pieces for piano inspired by the fairy tales of Hans Christian Andersen. During the first half of the 1990s her compositions alternated between lieder and small works for piano. In 1994, Pavlova produced her first major work, for a small chamber orchestra, Symphony no. 1 Farewell Russia. The symphony seeks to convey the melancholic burden and feelings of pain the composer felt on leaving her home country. The work is articulated in a single movement, and is scored for a small ensemble consisting of two violins, a cello, a piano, a flute, and a piccolo. It was recorded in Russia by soloists of the Moscow Philharmonic Orchestra two days after its first performance.

Pavlova waited for four years to compose her next work for larger forces, an Elegy (1998) for piano and string orchestra, barely four minutes long, motivated by the death of her teacher Shakhbagyan.

Her first symphonic work following the Elegy was the Symphony no. 2 "For the New Millennium" (1998), written that same year, her most ambitious work to date. Even before being revised four years later, it was brought to CD by Vladimir Fedoseyev. Pavlova returned to the composition of lieder, composing pieces like Miss me... but let me go at the beginning of September 2001. In the same way that Cristóbal Halffter saw his composition Adagio en forma de Rondó changed by the terrorist attacks of September 11, Pavlova - who had been shocked by these attacks, and who lived quite close to ground zero - decided to rededicate the song to the memory of the victims.

Pavlova is a member of the New York Women Composers, Inc.

==== Specialization in the Grand Forms ====
Besides supporting her prestige, the Second Symphony marks an important point in Pavlova's career, as she moved away from chamber music in successive works in favor of large orchestral compositions. In 2000, she sealed this change of orientation with the monumental Symphony no. 3 which was inspired by a New York monument to Joan of Arc and is characterized by its intense expressive reach. Consistent with her habit of revising her works, Pavlova continued to work on this piece, adding a guitar in a new version which was premiered in 2004.

Her Symphony no. 4 was written in 2002, as well as a second concert work, a monologue with solo violin in which she again used a string orchestra. From 2003 to 2005 Pavlova worked on her first incidental music, for the ballet Sulamith, to stage the 1908 story by Aleksandr Kuprin inspired by the Biblical story of King Solomon. A symphonic suite of three quarters of an hour was extracted from this ballet.

Pavlova has written several further symphonies (no. 11 appeared in 2021). Other works include the Thumbelina Ballet Suite (2008/2009), a Concertino for violin, piano and string orchestra (2012), and "Night Music" for violin and strings (2014).

== Works ==
Her music takes as its inspiration the great Russian masters of the 20th century (Prokofiev, Shostakovich, Rachmaninov, etc.), and each of her works seem crossed by the topic of uprooting and exile.

- "Lullaby for Irene" for piano, violin (or flute) and vibraphone (1972)
- Two Songs to Verses by Anna Akhmatova for soprano and piano (1974)
- "We Are the Love" to verses by Alla Pavlova for (mezzo-)soprano and piano quartet (1974)
- "The Dream" to verses by Anna Akhmatova for soprano and piano (1979)
- Impressions after Fairy-Tales by H. C. Andersen for piano (1990)
- Winter Morning to Verses by Alexander Pushkin for soprano, cello and flute (1993)
- Prelude for piano "For My Mother" (1994)
- "Summer Pictures for piano (1994)
- Symphony No. 1 "Farewell, Russia" for chamber orchestra (1994)
- The Old New York Nostalgia Suite for piano (1995)
- "Miss Me ... But Let Me Go" for violin, cello, two guitars and mezzo-soprano (1997)
- "I Loved You", masterpieces of Russian poetry for mezzo-soprano, violin and piano (1998)
- Elegy for piano and string orchestra (1998)
- Symphony No. 2 "For the New Millennium" (1998)
- The Old New York Nostalgia Suite for string orchestra, percussion, alto saxophone, tenor saxophone and trumpet (1998)
- Symphony No. 3 (2000)
- Symphony No. 4 (2002)
- Monolog for violin and string orchestra (2002)
- Suite from "Sulamith" (2003-2004)
- "Sulamith", ballet (2003-2005)
- Symphony No. 5 (2006)
- Symphony No. 6 (2008)
- Suite from "Thumbelina" (2008-2009)
- Symphony No. 7 (2011)
- Symphony No. 8 (2011)
- Concertino for violin, piano and string orchestra (2012)
- "Night Music" for violin and strings (2014
- Symphony No.9 "Violin Concerto" (2016)
- Symphony No.10 (2017)
- Symphony No.11 (2021)
