= Saul Lieberman =

American rabbi and scholar (1898–1983)

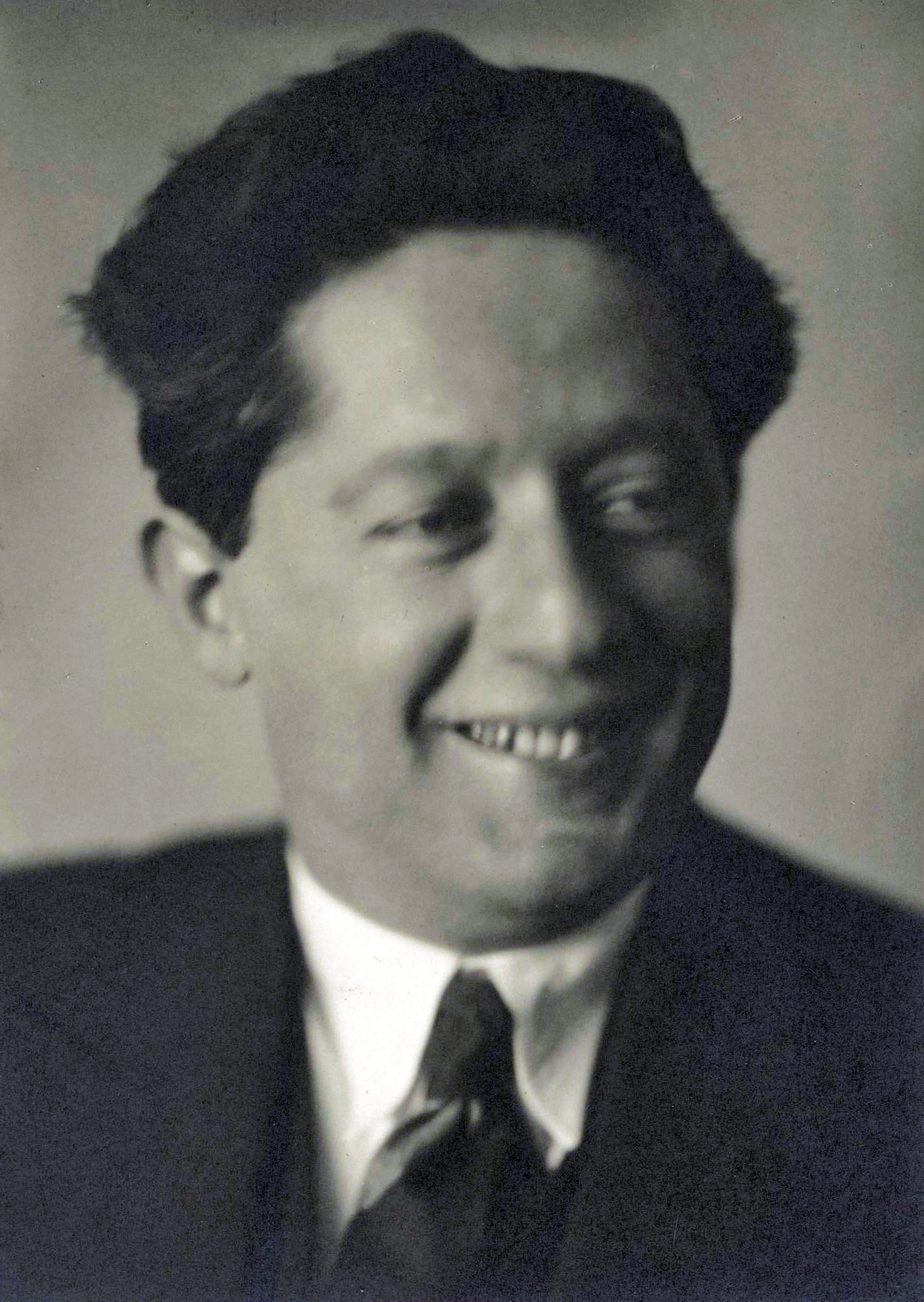
- Born: May 28, 1898; Motal, Russian Empire
- Died: March 23, 1983 (aged 84)
- Occupations: rabbi and scholar

Academic background
- Education: University of Kiev; Hebrew University of Jerusalem

Academic work
- Discipline: Talmudic studies
- Institutions: Jewish Theological Seminary of America; Harry Fischel Institute for Talmudic Research; American Academy for Jewish Research
- Main interests: Tosefta
- Notable works: Sifrei Zuta

Saul Lieberman (Hebrew: שאול ליברמן; May 28, 1898 – March 23, 1983), also known as Rabbi Shaul Lieberman or, among some of his students, the Gra״sh (Gaon Rabbeinu Shaul), was a rabbi and a Talmudic scholar. He served as Professor of Talmud at the Jewish Theological Seminary of America (JTSA) for over 40 years, and for many years was dean of the Harry Fischel Institute for Talmudic Research in Israel and also president of the American Academy for Jewish Research.

== Early life ==
Born in Motal, near Pinsk in the Russian Empire (now Belarus), he studied at the Orthodox yeshivot of Malch, Slobodka, and Novardok, where, at age 18, he received his semikha (rabbinic ordination). While studying at the Slobodka yeshiva, he befriended Yaakov Yitzchok Ruderman and Yitzchak Hutner, both of whom would become leaders of great seminaries in America.

In the 1920s, he attended the Kiev Gymnasium and University of Kiev. Following a short stay in Palestine, he continued his studies in France. In 1928, he settled in Jerusalem. He studied Talmudic philology and Greek language and literature at the Hebrew University of Jerusalem.

== Career ==
After completing his master's degree at Hebrew University, he was appointed lecturer there in Talmud in 1931 or 1932. The position was terminated in 1937 due to poor enrollment. He also taught at the Mizrachi Teachers Seminary, and from 1935 was dean of the Harry Fischel Institute for Talmudic Research in Jerusalem.

In 1940, he was invited both by Rabbi Yitzchak Hutner to teach in the Orthodox Yeshiva Chaim Berlin, and by the Jewish Theological Seminary of America to serve as professor of Hellenism and Jewish literature. Lieberman chose the offer by JTS. Lieberman's decision was motivated by a desire to "train American Jews to make a commitment to study and observe the mitzvot." In Chaim Dalfin's Conversations with the Rebbe (LA: JEC, 1996), pp. 54–63, Prof. Haim Dimitrovski relates that when he was newly hired at JTSA, he asked Rabbi Menachem Mendel Schneerson of Lubavitch whether he should remain in the Seminary, and the response was "as long as Lieberman is there." In 1949, he was appointed dean, and in 1958 rector, of the Seminary's rabbinical school.

Lieberman died on March 23, 1983, while flying to Jerusalem for Passover.

== Work ==
In 1929, Lieberman published Al ha-Yerushalmi, in which he suggested ways of emending corruptions in the text of the Jerusalem Talmud and offered variant readings to the text of the tractate of Sotah. This was followed by: a series of text studies of the Jerusalem Talmud, which appeared in Tarbiz; by Talmudah shel Keisaryah (1931), in which he expressed the view that the first three tractates of the order Nezikin in the Jerusalem Talmud had been compiled in Caesarea about the middle of the fourth century C.E.; and by Ha-Yerushalmi ki-Feshuto (1934), a commentary on the treatises Shabbat, Eruvin, and Pesahim of the Jerusalem Talmud (this was the first volume of a series that was never finished). His preoccupation with the Jerusalem Talmud impressed him with the necessity of clarifying the text of the tannaitic sources (rabbis of the first two centuries of the common era), especially that of the Tosefta, on which no commentaries had been composed by the earlier authorities (Rishonim), and to whose elucidation few scholars had devoted themselves in later generations.

He published the four-volume Tosefeth Rishonim, a commentary on the entire Tosefta with textual corrections based on manuscripts, early printings, and quotations found in early authorities. He also published Tashlum Tosefta, an introductory chapter to the second edition of M. S. Zuckermandel's Tosefta edition (1937), dealing with quotations from the Tosefta by early authorities that are not found in the text.

Years later, Lieberman returned to the systematic elucidation of the Tosefta. He undertook the publication of the Tosefta text, based on manuscripts and accompanied by brief explanatory notes, and of an extensive commentary called Tosefta ki-Fshuṭah. The latter combined philological research and historical observations with a discussion of the entire talmudic and rabbinic literature in which the relevant Tosefta text is either commented upon or quoted. Between 1955 and 1973, ten volumes of the new edition were published, representing the text and the commentaries on the entire orders of Zera'im, Mo'ed and Nashim. Furthermore, in 1988, three volumes were published posthumously on the order of Nezikin, including tractates Bava Kama, Bava Metzia, and Bava Basra. The entire set was republished in the 1990s in thirteen volumes, and again in 2001 in twelve volumes.

In Sifrei Zuta (1968), Lieberman advanced the view that this halakhic Midrash was in all likelihood finally edited by Bar Kappara in Lydda.

Other books of his were Sheki'in (1939), on Jewish legends, customs, and literary sources found in Karaite and Christian polemical writings, and Midreshei Teiman (1940), wherein he showed that the Yemenite Midrashim had preserved exegetical material which had been deliberately omitted by the rabbis. He edited a variant version of Midrash Debarim Rabbah (1940, 19652). In his view that version had been current among Sephardi Jewry, while the standard text had been that of Ashkenazi Jewry. In 1947 he published Hilkhot ha-Yerushalmi which he identified as a fragment of a work by Maimonides on the Jerusalem Talmud in a similar vein as the Rif is to the Babylonian Talmud. Lieberman also edited the hitherto unpublished Tosefta commentary Hasdei David by David Pardo on the order Tohorot; the first part of this work appeared in 1970.

His two English volumes, Greek in Jewish Palestine (1942) and Hellenism in Jewish Palestine (1950), which also appeared in a Hebrew translation, illustrate the influence of Hellenistic culture on Jewish Palestine in the first centuries C.E.

A number of his works have appeared in new and revised editions. Lieberman served as editor in chief of a new critical edition of Maimonides' Mishneh Torah (vol. 1, 1964), and as an editor of the Judaica series of Yale University, where he worked closely with Herbert Danby, the Anglican scholar of the Mishnah. He also edited several scholarly miscellanies. He contributed numerous studies to scholarly publications as well as notes to books of fellow scholars. In these he dwelt on various aspects of the world of ideas of the rabbis, shed light on events in the talmudic period, and elucidated scores of obscure words and expressions of talmudic and midrashic literature.

He also published a heretofore unknown Midrashic work that he painstakingly pieced together by deriving its text from an anti-Jewish polemic written by Raymond Martini, and various published lectures of Medieval Rabbis. Lieberman's work was published while he headed Machon Harry Fishel.

Jacob Neusner, a leading scholar of the history of rabbinic Judaism, criticized the bulk of Lieberman's work as idiosyncratic in that it lacked a valid methodology and was prone to other serious shortcomings (see Sources below). However, ten years earlier, in an article published shortly after his death, Lieberman strongly criticized Neusner's lack of scholarship in the latter's translation of three tractates of the Yerushalmi. Meir Bar-Ilan, Lieberman's nephew, accused Neusner of being biased against Lieberman due to "a personal issue".

== Paradox in affiliation ==
Perhaps because he was so deeply involved in the Seminary, Lieberman was often accused (especially posthumously) of being on the very right wing of Conservative Judaism. Personally fully observant of Halakha, he would not pray in a synagogue which did not have separate seating for men and women. Lieberman insisted that all services at the Seminary's Stein Hall, where he prayed daily, have a mechitza even though most Conservative synagogues did not. Additionally, Lieberman saw that the seminary synagogue where he prayed used an Orthodox siddur rather than one produced by the Rabbinical Assembly.

== The Lieberman clause ==
The Lieberman clause is a clause included in a ketubah (Jewish wedding document), created by and named after Saul Lieberman, that stipulates that divorce will be adjudicated by a modern bet din (rabbinic court) in order to prevent the problem of the agunah, a woman not allowed to remarry religiously because she had never been granted a religious divorce. It was first introduced in the 1950s by rabbis in Judaism's Conservative movement.

== Personal life ==
Avrohom Yeshaya Karelitz was his first cousin. Chaim Kanievsky and Joseph B. Soloveitchik were both his first cousins once removed.

Lieberman married Rachel Rabinowitz in 1922. She was the daughter of Laizer Rabinowitz, the rabbi of Minsk, and granddaughter of Yerucham Yehuda Leib Perelmann. They moved to Mandatory Palestine in 1927, but she died three years later, in 1930.

Lieberman studied at Hebrew University and received a Master's in Talmudic and ancient Palestinian studies.

He remarried in 1932, to Judith Lieberman, a daughter of Meir Bar-Ilan, leader of the Mizrachi (religious Zionism) movement; granddaughter of Naftali Zvi Yehuda Berlin; and niece of Baruch Epstein. Judith Lieberman studied at Hunter College and then at Columbia University under Professor Moses Hadas and Professor Muzzey. From 1941, she served as Hebrew principal and then as dean of Hebrew studies of Orthodox Shulamith School for Girls in New York, the first Jewish day school for girls in North America. Among her publications were Robert Browning and Hebraism (1934), and an autobiographical chapter which was included in Thirteen Americans, Their Spiritual Autobiographies (1953), edited by Louis Finkelstein.

The Liebermans had no children.

== Awards and honors ==
- In 1957, Lieberman was awarded the Bialik Prize for Jewish thought.
- In 1971, he was awarded the Israel Prize for Jewish Studies.
- In 1976, he received the Harvey Prize of the Haifa Technion.

He was an honorary member of the Academy of the Hebrew Language, a fellow of the American Academy of Arts and Sciences, and a fellow of the Israel Academy of Sciences and Humanities.

== See also ==
- List of Bialik Prize recipients
- List of Israel Prize recipients

== Sources ==
- Saul Lieberman and the Orthodox. Marc B. Shapiro. University of Scranton Press. 2006. ISBN 1-58966-123-0
- Saul Lieberman: the man and his work / Elijah J. Schochet and Solomon Spiro. New York: Jewish Theological Seminary of America, 2005.
- Saul Lieberman, Rabbinic Interpretation of Scripture and The Hermeneutic Rules of the Aggadah in Hellenism in Jewish Palestine JTS, NY, 1994
- Seventy Faces Norman Lamm, Moment Vol. II, No. 6 June 1986/Sivan 5746
- Tradition Renewed: A History of the Jewish Theological Seminary of America, Vol. II, p. 450, 474, JTS, NY, 1997
- Article by Rabbi Emmanuel Rackman published in The Jewish Week May 8, 1997, page 28.
- Jacob Neusner, Why There Never Was a “Talmud of Caesarea.” Saul Lieberman’s Mistakes. Atlanta, 1994: Scholars Press for South Florida Studies in the History of Judaism.
