= Salome (given name) =

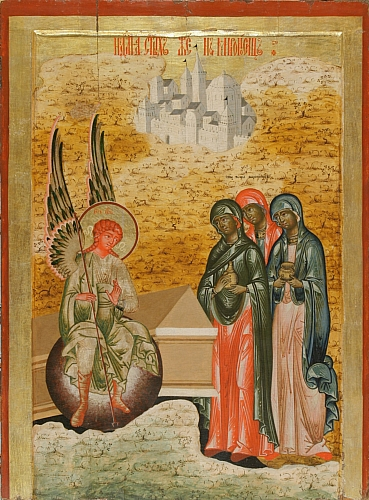
- A Russian icon of the two Marys and Salome at Jesus Christ's empty grave following the resurrection. Salome is a Christian saint.
- Gender: female

Origin
- Origin: Hebrew
- Meaning: peace

Salome is a feminine name derived from the Hebrew word shalom, meaning "peace".

There are two origins of the name Salome. Salome is the name of a Christian disciple, who was one of the women who witnessed the resurrection of Jesus Christ along with the two Marys (Mark 15:40–16:8). Another Salome (c. early 1st century CE) was the daughter of Herodias, and nemesis of John the Baptist (Mark 6:17–29 and Matt 14:3–11).

The name, as Solomija (Соломія), was among the top 5 names given to newborn girls in 2024 in Ukraine. It is ranked among the top 100 names for girls in France. It is less popular in the United States, where it does not rank among the top 1,000 names; just 82 newborn girls there were given the name in 2010.

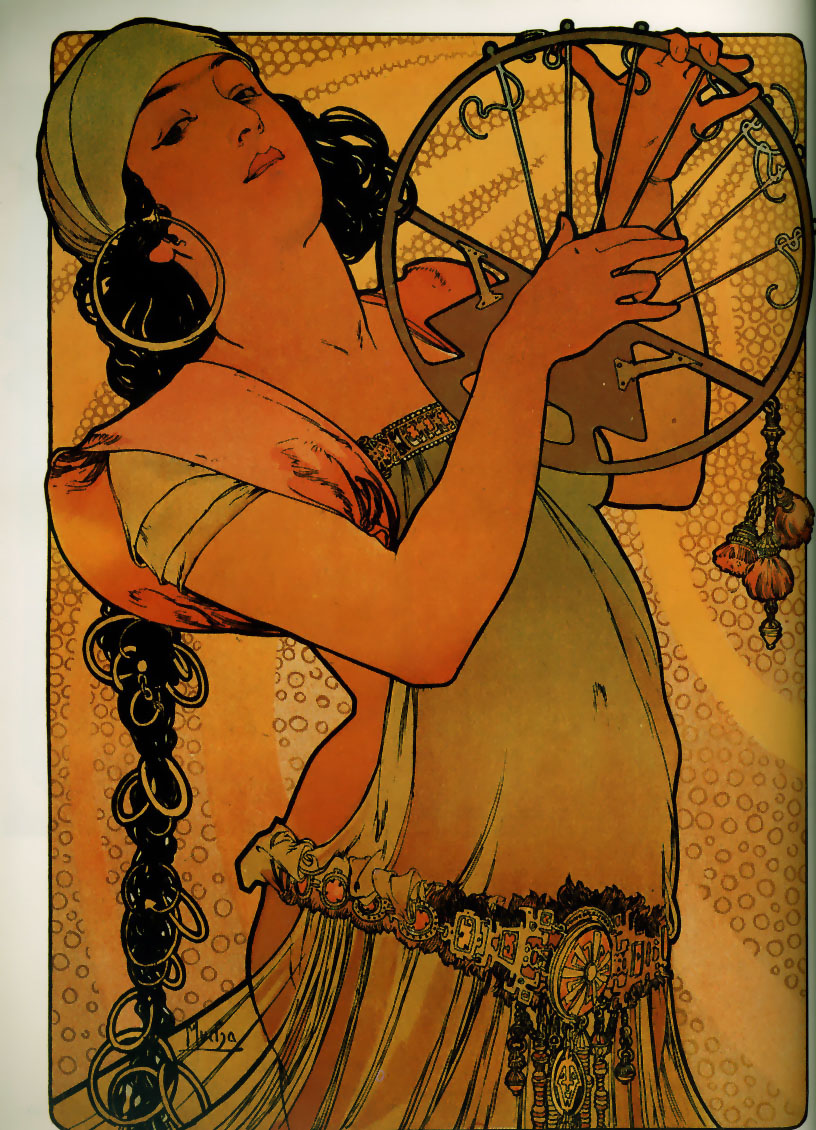
Salome, an 1897 Art Nouveau illustration by Alfons Mucha.

== Variants ==
- Salomé, French, Portuguese, Spanish
- Salomè, Italian
- Salomea, Polish
- Salomėja, Lithuanian
- Salomena, Czech
- Саломея, Russian
- Соломія (Solomiya), Ukrainian
- ሰሎሜ, Amharic
- שְׁלוֹמִית (Shelomit), hebrew

== People with the given name ==
- Salomé Afonso (born 1997), Portuguese runner
- Salome Alt (1568–1633), Austrian mistress to the reigning Prince-Archbishop of Salzburg
- Salomè Antonazzoni (fl. 1619 – fl. 1642), Italian stage actress
- Salomé Báncora (born 1993), Argentine alpine skier
- Salomé de Bahia (born 1945), Brazilian vocalist in France
- Salomé Barojas (born 1957), Mexican baseball player
- Salome Bey (1933–2020), American-born Canadian singer-songwriter, composer, and actress
- Salomé Breziner, Belgian-born American film director and screenwriter
- Salome Chachua (born 1990), Georgian ballroom and Latin dancer and choreographer
- Salome Chepchumba (born 1982), Kenyan middle-distance runner
- Salome Clausen, Swiss pop music artist
- Salome Dadiani (1849–1913), Georgian princess
- Salome Dell (born 1993), athlete from Papua New Guinea
- Salome Devidze (born 1986), Georgian tennis player
- Salome Hocking (1859–1927), Cornish novelist
- Salomé de Gélieu (1742–1820), Swiss educator and governess
- Salome Gluecksohn-Waelsch (1907–2007), German-born U.S. geneticist
- Salome Halldorson (1887–1970), Canadian politician in Manitoba
- Salomé Haller (born 1975), French operatic and concert soprano
- Salomé Herrera, Mexican pianist
- Salomé di Iorio (born 1980), Argentine lawyer and football referee
- Salome Jens (born 1935), American actress who appeared in Star Trek: Deep Space Nine
- Salome Kammer (born 1959), German actress, singer and cellist
- Salome Khubuluri (born 1988), Georgian footballer
- Salomé Kora (born 1994), Swiss sprinter
- Salome Lang (born 1997), Swiss athlete who competes in the high jump
- Salomé Leclerc (born 1986), Canadian singer-songwriter
- Salome Lozano Leon (born 2007), French rhythmic gymnast
- Salome Maswime, South African clinician and global health expert
- Salome Melia, Georgian chess player
- Salomé Moiane (born 1951), Mozambican politician
- Salome Mulugeta, Ethiopian and Eritrean-American filmmaker and actor
- Salomėja Nėris (1904 – 1945), Lithuanian poet
- Salome Nyirarukundo (born 1997), Rwandan long-distance runner
- Salome Pazhava (born 1997), Georgian individual rhythmic gymnast
- Salome Reischer (1899–1980), Austrian chess player
- Salome Samadashvili (born 1976), Georgian politician and former diplomat
- Salome Sellers (1800–1909), American centenarian who was the last known person born in the 18th century
- Salomé Stampfli (born 2005), Liechtensteiner footballer
- Salome Tabuatalei, Fijian athlete and canoeist
- Salome Tanuvasa, New Zealand artist
- Salome Thorkelsdottir (Þorkelsdóttir) (born 1927), Icelandic politician
- Salomé Ureña (1847–1897), poet and teacher from the Dominican Republic
- Salome Zurabishvili, President of the Republic of Georgia

=== Variants ===
- Solomiia Bobrovska (born 1989), Ukrainian politician and civic activist
- Solomiya Brateyko (born 1999), Ukrainian table tennis player
- Solomiya Krushelnytska (1872–1952), Ukrainian soprano opera star
- Solomiia Pavlychko (1958–1999), Ukrainian literary critic, philosopher and translator
- Solomiia Vynnyk, Ukrainian freestyle wrestler

== Fictional characters ==
- Salome, a character in the novel The Promise
- Salome Otterbourne, a character in Death on the Nile by Agatha Christie
