= Judith Lieberman =

American educator (1904–1978)

Judith Lieberman

Doctor Judith Lieberman (August 14, 1904 — December 21, 1978) was an American educator and school administrator. She served as Hebrew principal and later dean of Hebrew studies of Shulamith School for Girls in New York City, the first Jewish day school for girls in North America. Her tenure there started in 1941 and lasted over 25 years.

She was the granddaughter of Rabbi Naftali Zvi Yehuda Berlin, daughter of Rabbi Meir Bar-Ilan (leader of the Mizrachi), and second wife of Jewish religious scholar Saul Lieberman.

Lieberman was born in Lithuania and attended elementary school in Berlin. Lieberman spent World War I with her paternal grandmother, the unofficial administrator of the Volozhiner Yeshiva in Belarus. She joined her immediate family after the war in the United States and graduated from New York City public high school. Lieberman studied for her bachelor's degree at Hunter College, and then moved to Columbia University under Professor Hates and Professor David S. Muzzey. She completed a PhD in comparative literature at the University of Zurich in 1931.

In 1932, she married Saul Lieberman, who had been widowed two years earlier. She spent the remainder of the decade in Jerusalem with her husband and then moved back to New York's Upper West Side with him. She quickly gained a position at Shulamith, then based in Borough Park.

Among her publications were Robert Browning and Hebraism (1934), and an autobiographical chapter which was included in Thirteen Americans, Their Spiritual Autobiographies (1953), edited by Louis Finkelstein.
