= Shula =

Shula may refer to:

== People ==
=== Surname ===
- Chris Shula (born 1986), American football coach and current defensive coordinator for the Los Angeles Rams, son of Dave
- Dave Shula (born 1959), American footballer and coach, son of Don
- Don Shula (1930–2020), American footballer and coach, father of Dave and Mike
- Mike Shula (born 1965), American footballer and coach, son of Don

=== Given name ===
- A variant of the Hebraic female name Shulamith
- Shula Hebden-Lloyd, née Shula Archer, fictional character in UK radio series The Archers
- Shula Keshet (born 1959), Israeli activist and artist
- Shula Kishik-Cohen (1917–2017), Israeli spy
- Shula Marks (born 1938), South African historian

== Other uses ==
- Al-Shula, football club in Aden, Yemen
