= Shulamith (disambiguation) =

Shulamith or Shulamit is a Hebrew-language female given name, from Hebrew: שולמית \ שׁוּלַמִּית shulamít, a feminine form of Solomon and Shlomo. See also Shlomit, another Hebrew female given name cognate with the name above.

Shulamith or Shulamit may also refer to:

- Shulamith School for Girls, New York, U.S.
- Shulamit (play), a play by Abraham Goldfaden
- Shulamith (album), the 2013 album by Poliça
- Shulamith (cat), the cat that founded the American Curl breed

== See also ==
- Salome (disambiguation)
- Shalom (disambiguation)
- Shula (disambiguation)
- Shulamite (disambiguation)
