= Solomiya =

Solomiya (Ukrainian: Соломія), also spelled Solomia or Solomiia, is a Ukrainian feminine given name, a bvariant of Salome. Notable people with the name include:

- Solomiia Bobrovska, Ukrainian politician and civic activist
- Solomiya Brateyko, Ukrainian table tennis player
- Solomiya Ivakhiv, Ukrainian-born classical violinist
- Solomiya Krushelnytska (1872–1952), Ukrainian soprano singer
- Solomia Lukyanets (born 2001), Ukrainian opera singer
- Solomiia Pavlychko, Ukrainian literary critic, philosopher, feminist and translator
- Solomiia Vynnyk, Ukrainian freestyle wrestler

== See also ==
- Olena Karpenko, Ukrainian singer who goes by the stage name "Solomia"
