= Gustaaf Wappers =

Belgian painter (1803–1874)

Gustave Wappers
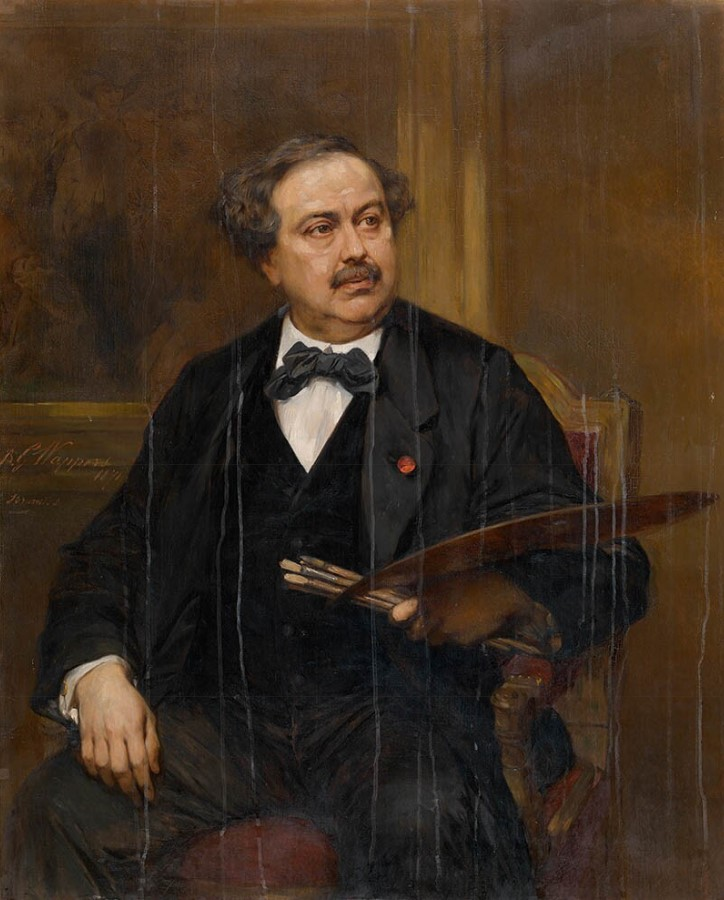
- Self-portrait (1871)
- Born: 23 August 1803; Antwerp, France (now Belgium)
- Died: 16 December 1874 (aged 71); Paris, France
- Education: Royal Academy of Fine Arts Antwerp
- Known for: Painting
- Movement: Romanticism

Egide Charles Gustave, Baron Wappers (23 August 1803 – 6 December 1874) was a Belgian painter. His work is generally considered to be Flemish and he signed his work with the Dutch form of his name, Gustaaf Wappers.

== Biography ==
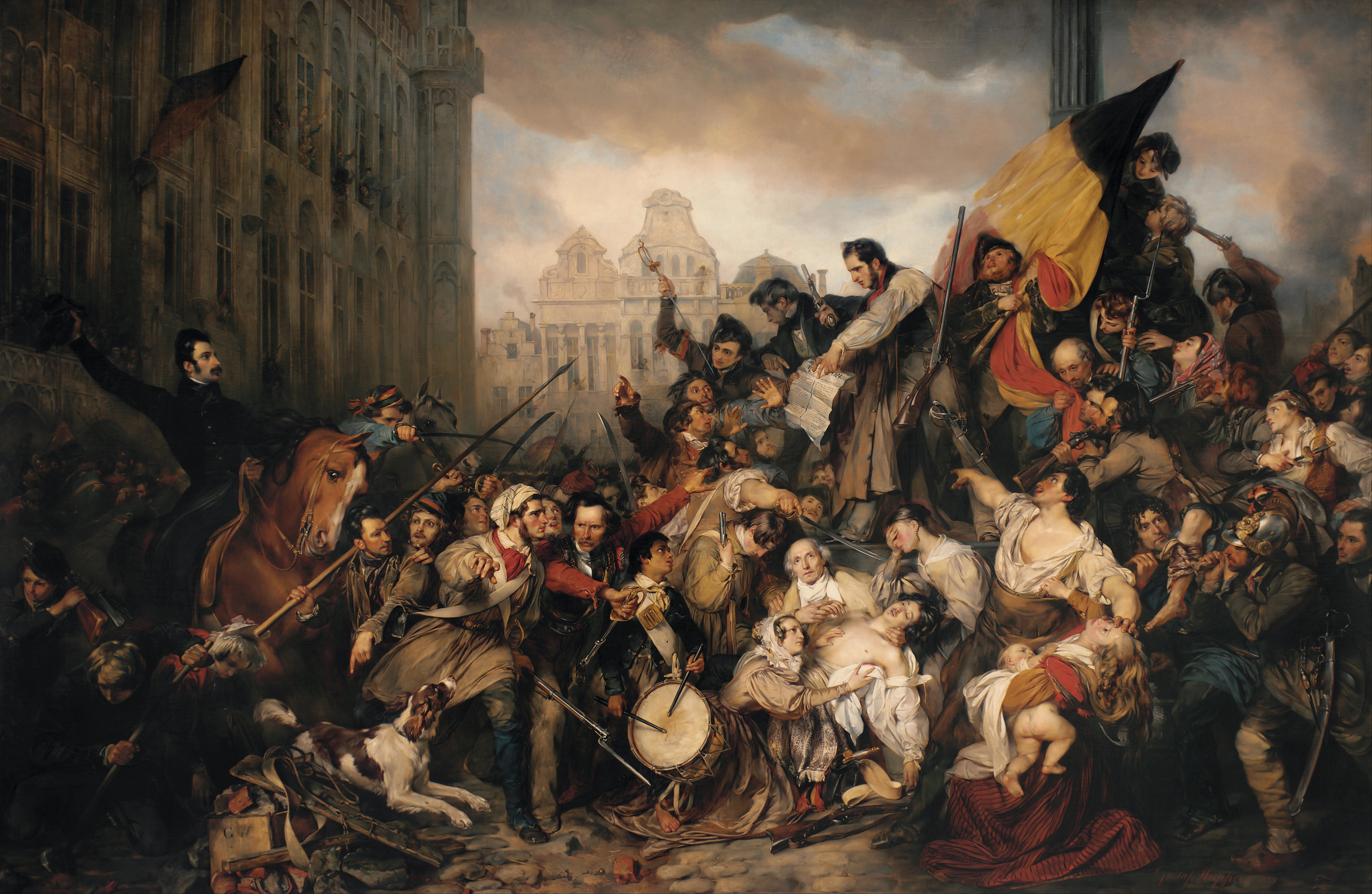
Episode of the Belgian Revolution of 1830, 1835. Royal Museums of Fine Arts of Belgium, Brussels.

He studied at the Royal Academy of Fine Arts in Antwerp, and during 1826 in Paris. The Romantic movement with its new ideas about art and politics was astir in France. Wappers was the first Belgian artist to take advantage of this state of affairs, and his first exhibited painting, "The Devotion of the Burgomaster of Leiden," appeared at the appropriate moment and had great success in the Brussels Salon in 1830, the year of the Belgian Revolution. While political, this remarkable work revolutionized the direction of Flemish painters.

Wappers was invited to the court at Brussels, and was favoured with commissions. In 1832 the city of Antwerp appointed him Professor of Painting.

He exhibited his masterpiece, "Episode of the Belgian Revolution of 1830" or rather "Episode of the September Days of 1830 on the Grand Place of Brussels", (Royal Museum of Fine Arts of Belgium, Brussels) at the Antwerp Salon in 1834. He was subsequently appointed painter to Leopold, King of the Belgians. At the death of Matthieu-Ignace Van Brée in 1839 he was elevated to director of the Antwerp Academy. As a teacher at the Antwerp Academy he trained a great number of pupils including Ford Madox Brown, Jozef Van Lerius, Lawrence Alma-Tadema, William Duffield, Emil Hünten, the Czech history painter Karel Javůrek, Jaroslav Čermák, Ludwig von Hagn, Josephus Laurentius Dyckmans, Eugene van Maldeghem, Ferdinand Pauwels and Jacob Jacobs.

His works are numerous. Some of them depict traditional devotional subjects ("Christ Entombed"), while others illustrate the Romantic view of history: "Charles I taking leave of his Children", "Charles IX", "Camoens", "Peter the Great at Saardam", and "Boccaccio at the Court of Joanna of Naples".

Louis Philippe gave him a commission to paint a large painting for the gallery at Versailles, "The Defence of Rhodes by the Knights of St John of Jerusalem". He finished the work in 1844, the same year that he received the title of baron from Belgian king Leopold I. After retiring as director of the Antwerp Academy, he settled in 1853 in Paris, where he died in 1873.

== Honours ==
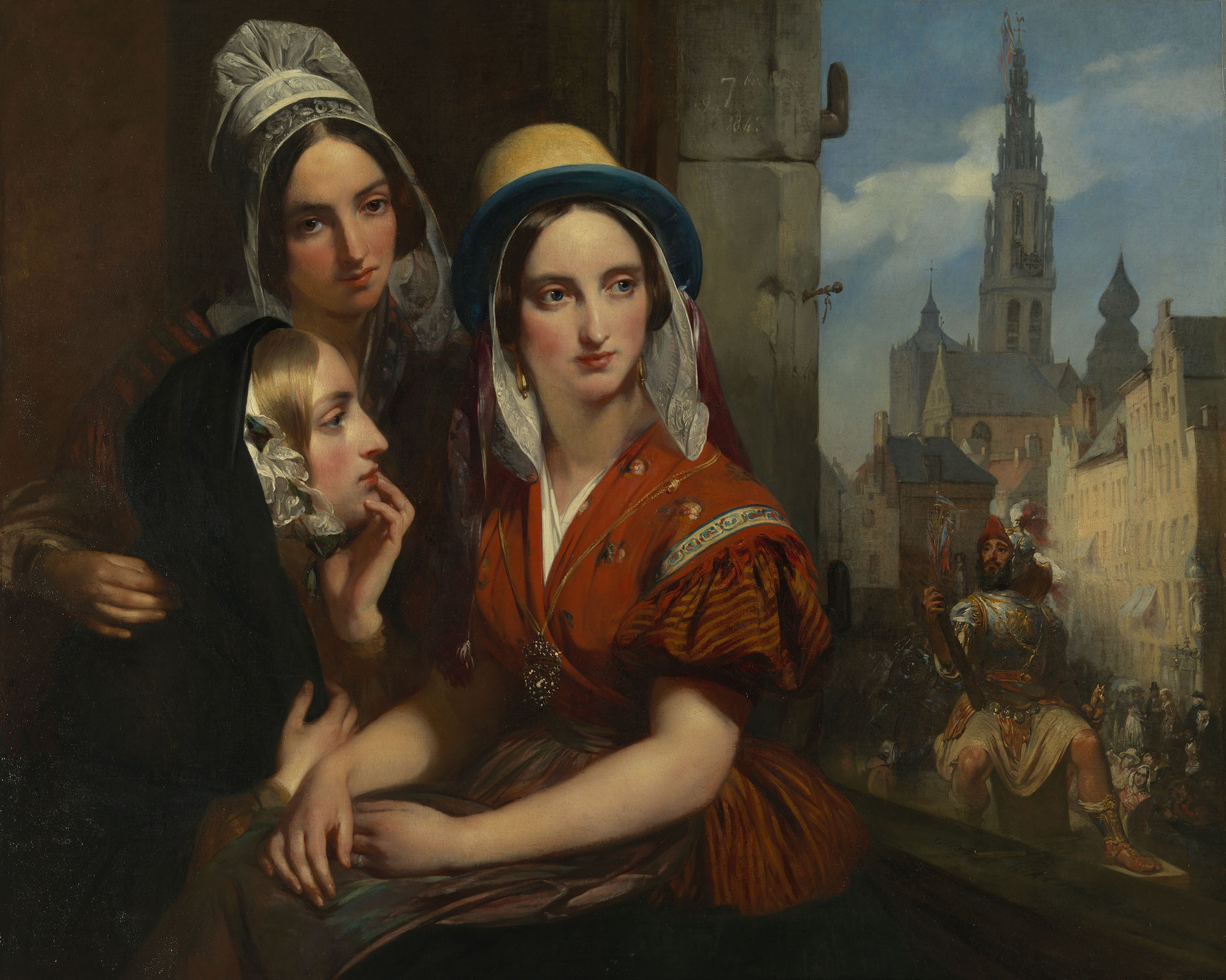
Souvenir of Antwerp (1843)

- Titular painter of the King.
- Saxe-Coburg and Gotha: Member of the Saxe-Ernestine House Order.
- Kingdom of Portugal: Knight of the Military Order of Christ.
- Belgium: commander of the order of Leopold (Belgium).
- France: officer of the Legion of Honour.

== Gallery ==
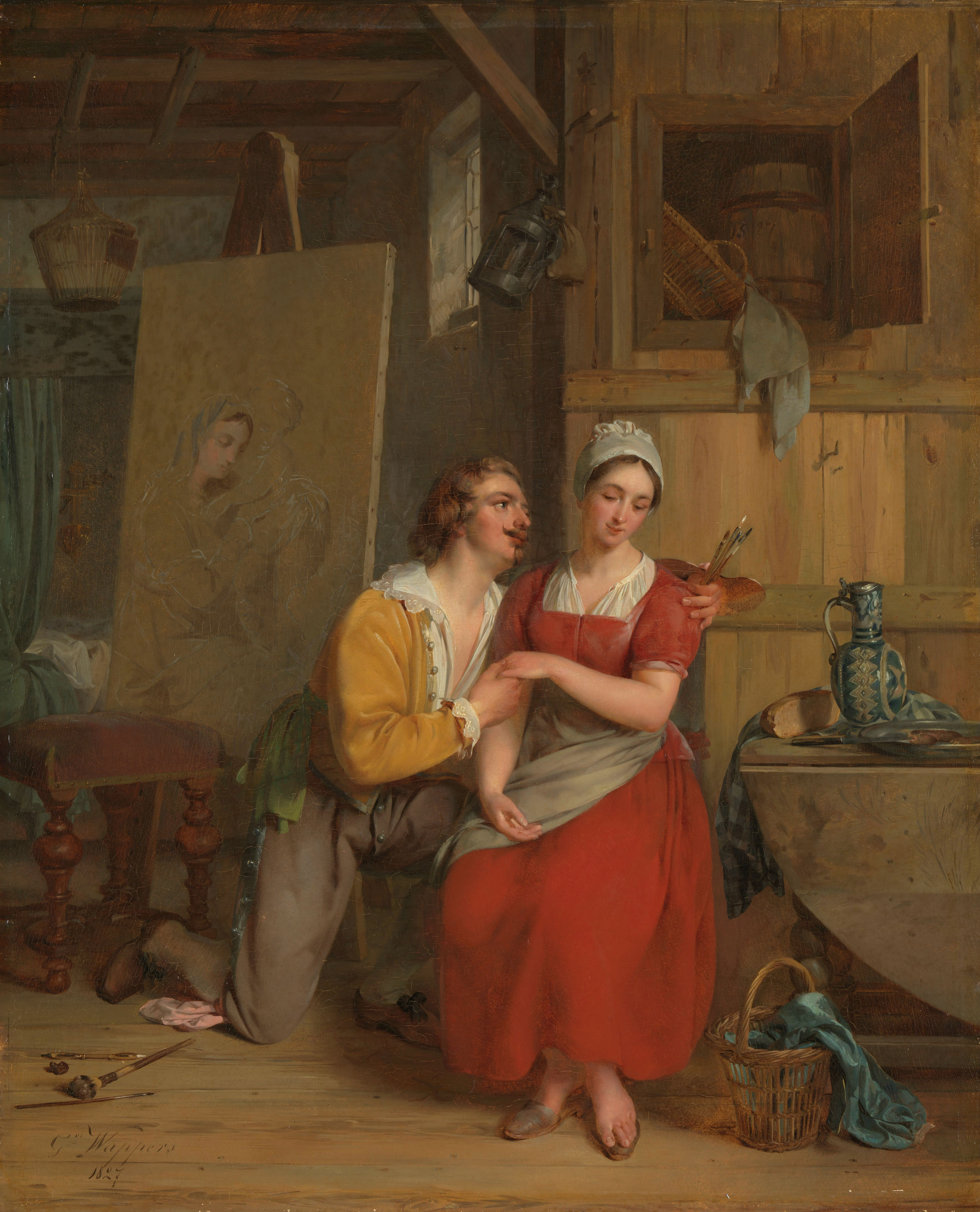
Anthony van Dyck wooing his Model, 1827

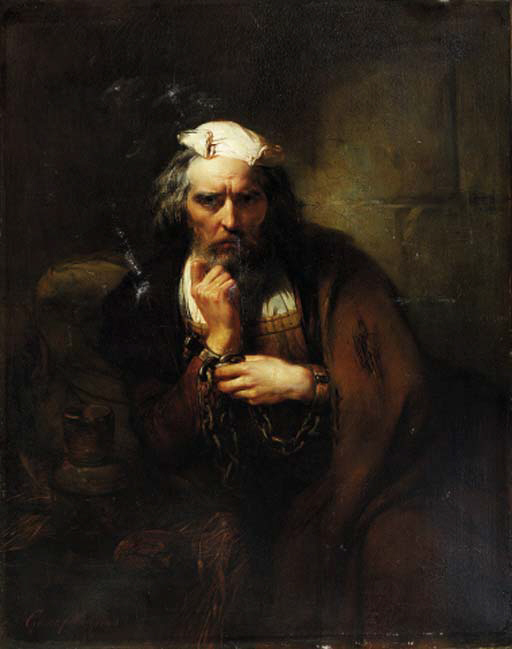
Christopher Columbus in Chains, 1846

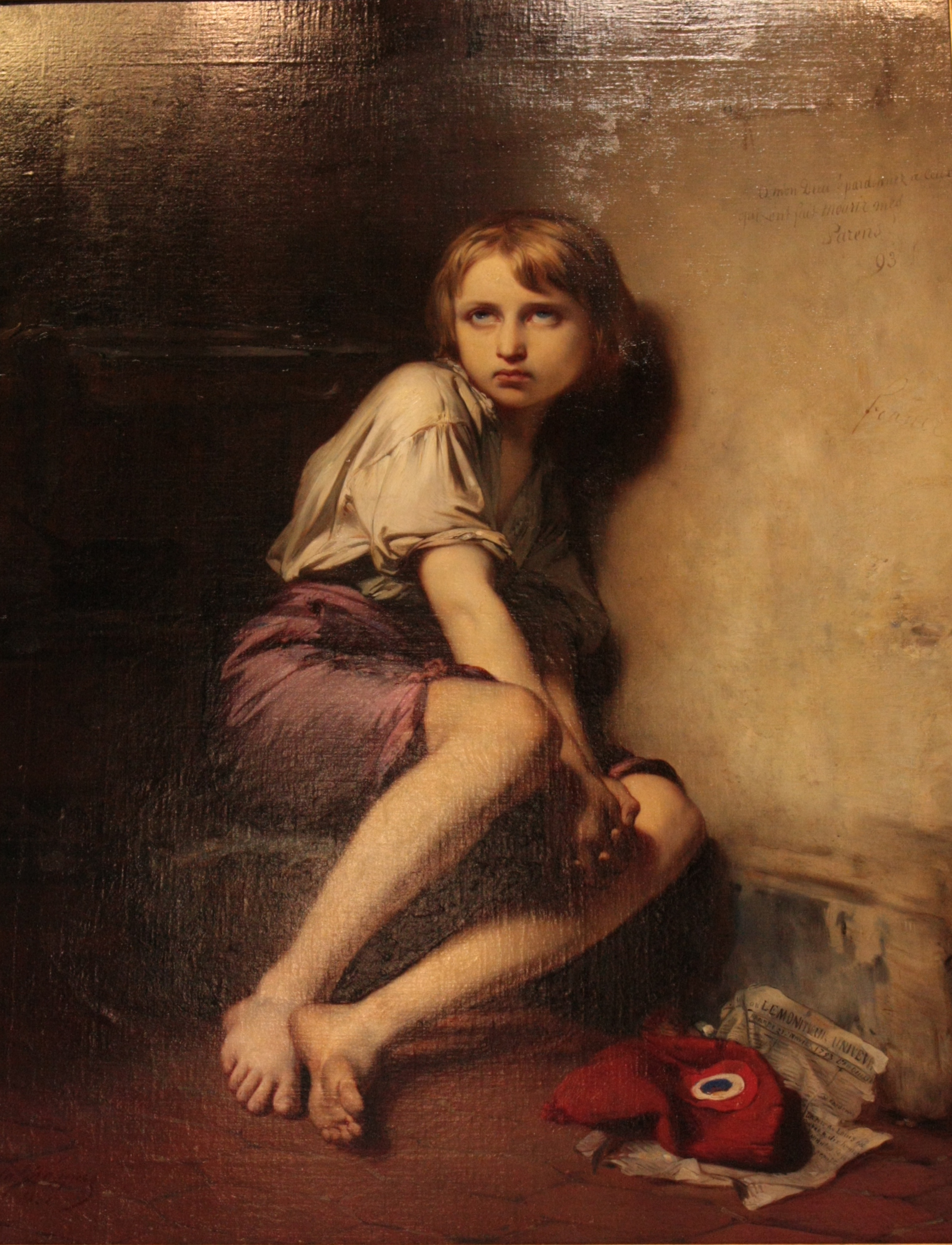
The Dauphin in the Temple Prison, 1850

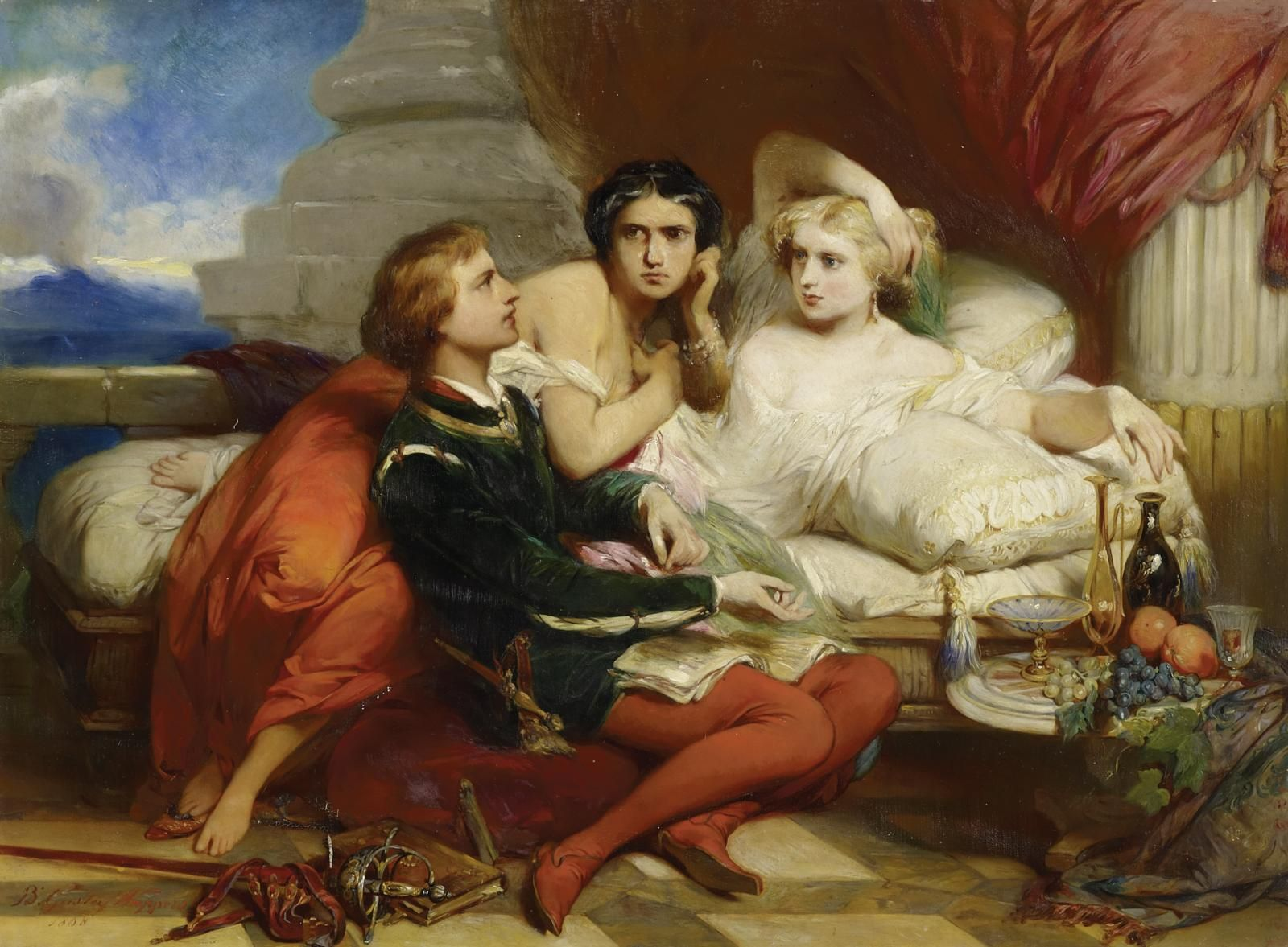
Giovanni Boccaccio reads The Decameron to Joanna of Naples, 1868

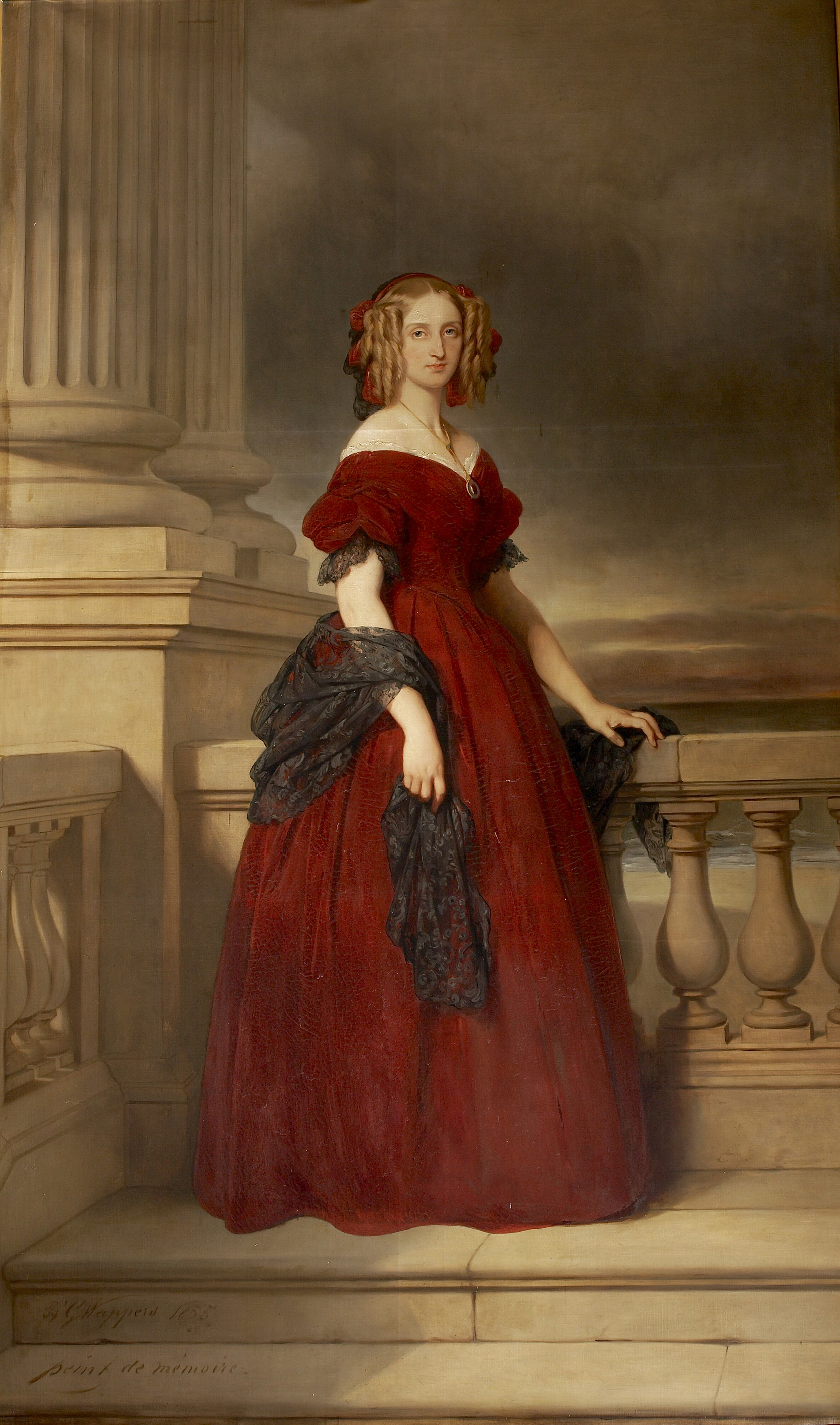
Marie-Louise, Queen of the Belgians, 1855

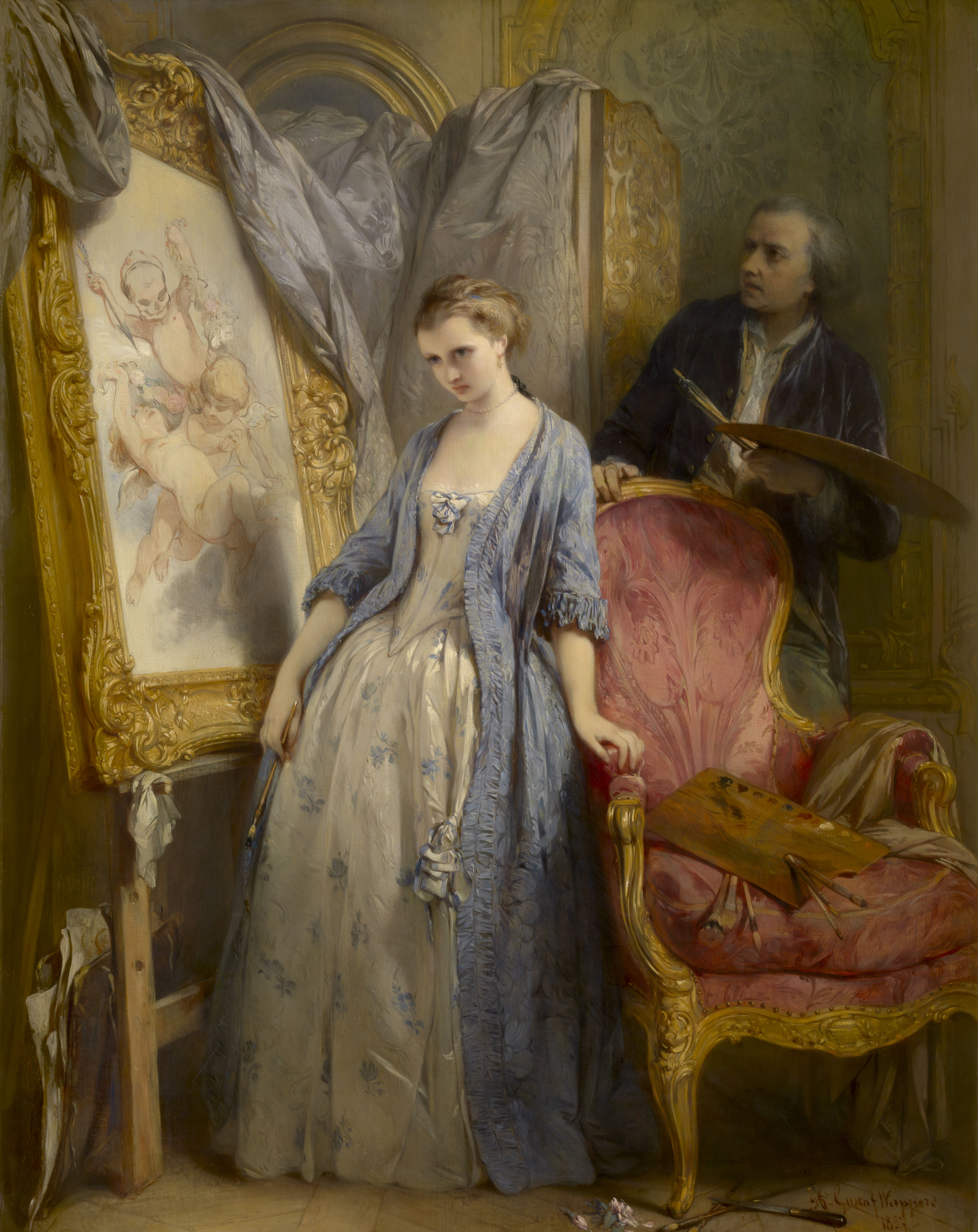
Young artist in reverie, 1857

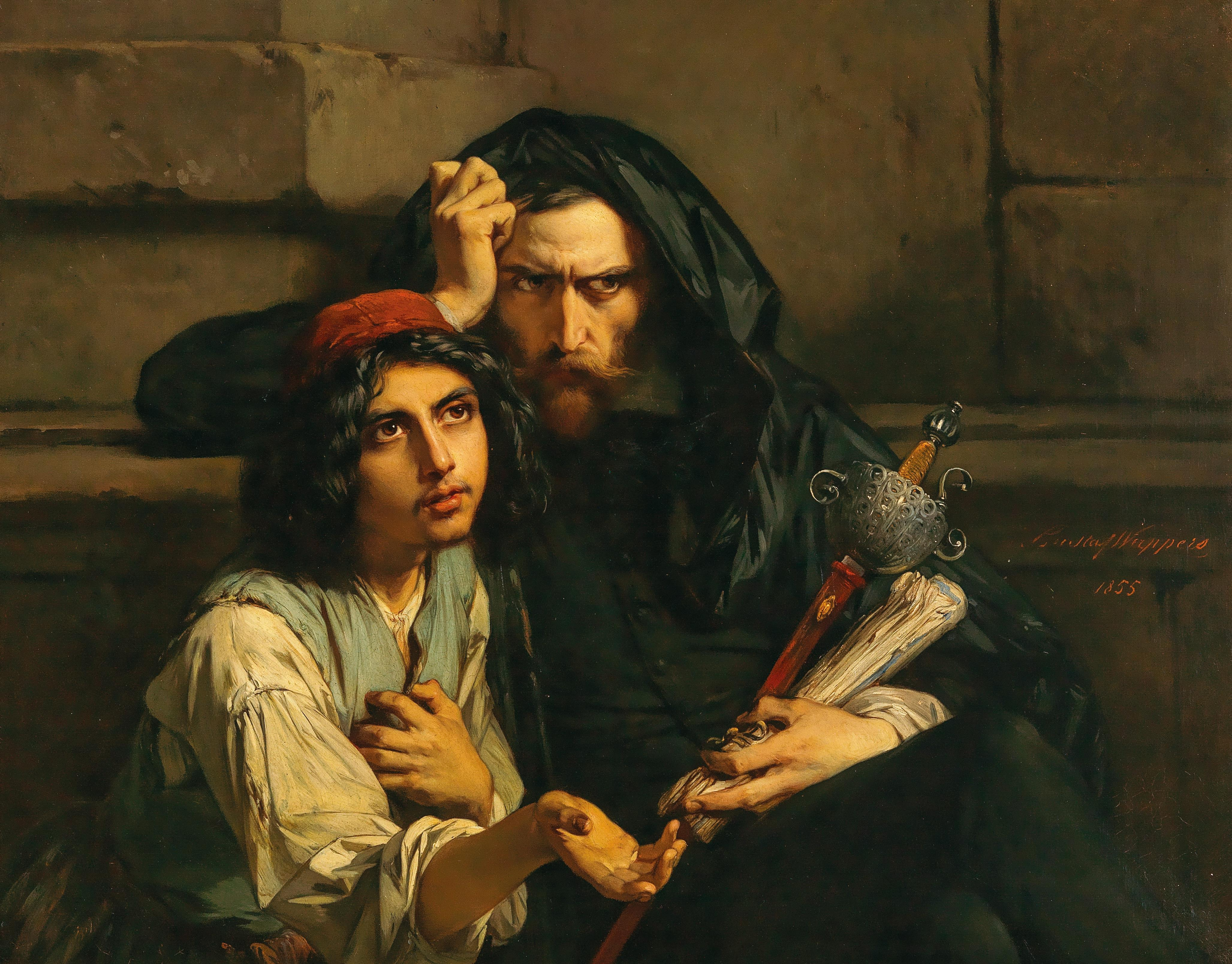
Luís de Camões and his guide, 1855

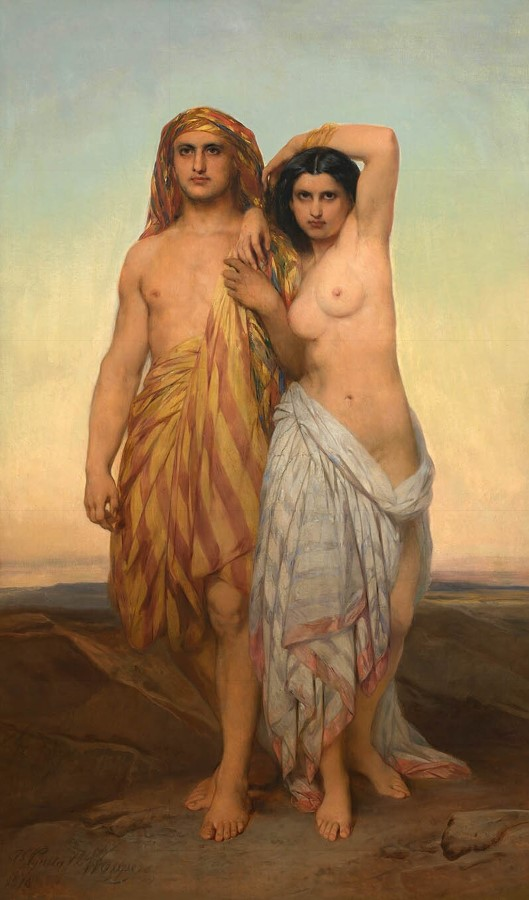
The Shulammite, 1870
