= Episode of the Belgian Revolution of 1830 =

1835 oil painting by Gustaaf Wappers

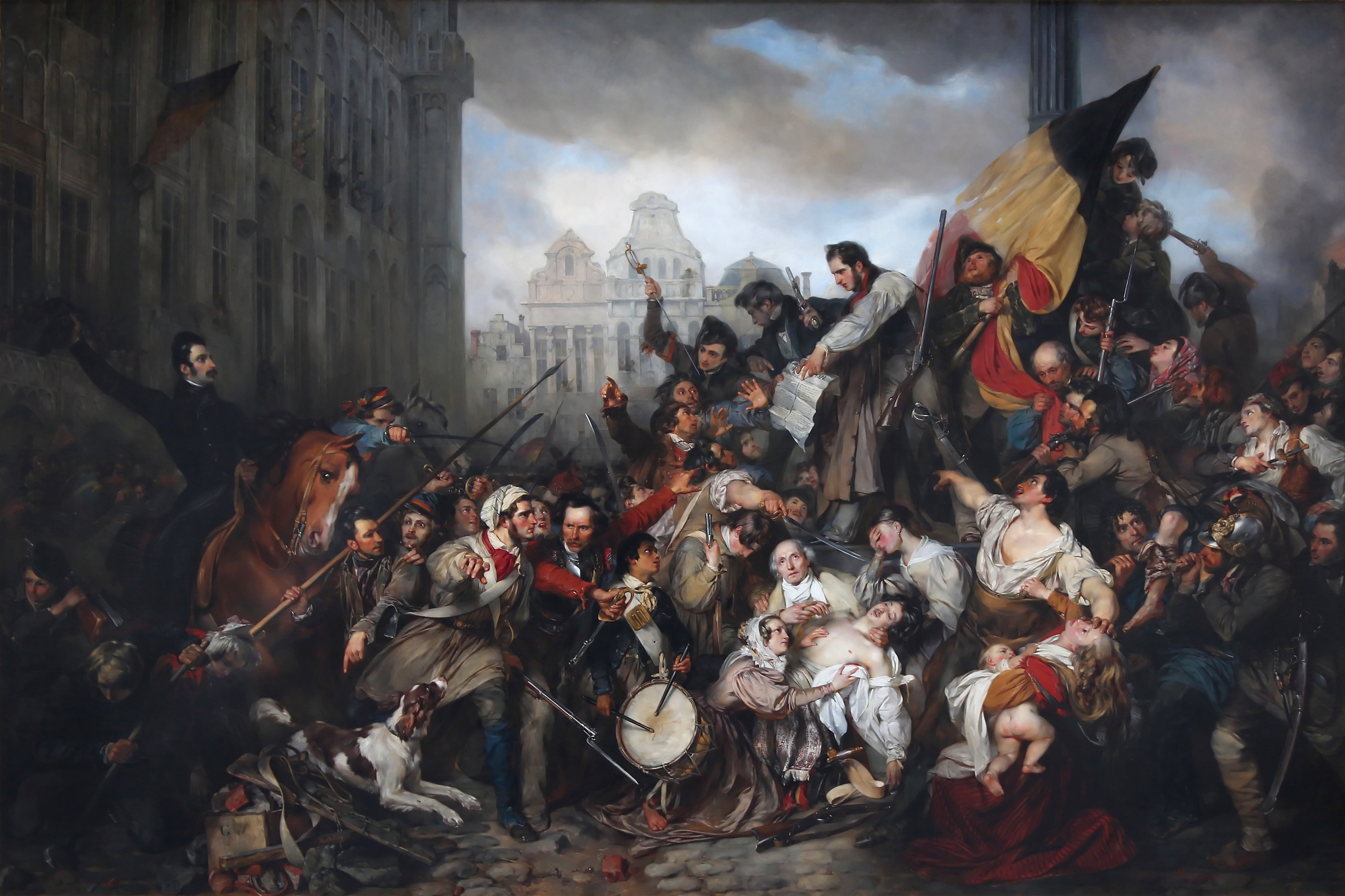
- Artist: Gustaaf Wappers
- Year: 1835
- Medium: Oil on canvas
- Subject: Belgian Revolution
- Dimensions: 444 cm × 660 cm (175 in × 260 in)
- Location: Oldmasters Museum, Brussels, Belgium
- Accession: 2692

Episode of the Belgian revolution of 1830 (Note: Dutch: Tafereel van de Septemberdagen 1830 op de Grote Markt te Brussel, lit. 'Scene of the days of September 1830 on the Grand Market of Brussels'; French: Épisode des Journées de Septembre 1830 sur la place de l'Hôtel de ville de Bruxelles, lit. 'Episode of the days of September 1830 on the place of the Brussels Town Hall'; also known as Episode During the Belgian Revolution of 1830, Episode from the Belgian Revolution of 1830, Episode from the Four Days of 1830, or Episode of the September Revolution of 1830) is an oil painting by Belgian artist Gustaaf Wappers, (Note: Also spelled Gustaf Wappers or Gustave Wappers) completed in 1835. It is a romantic depiction of the moment when the Belgian Declaration of Independence was read to the people of Brussels during the Belgian Revolution. The work is now in the Oldmasters Museum in Brussels, Belgium.

== Background ==
Following the Congress of Vienna in 1815, the territory of the then Southern Netherlands was ceded from the remains of the First French Empire to form part of the Kingdom of the Netherlands. Inspired by Liberalism, Catholic anti-Protestantism, recent food crises, and Francophone interests, the people of the then Southern Netherlands engaged in open revolt in August 1830, eventually declaring independence in October of that same year and establishing the Kingdom of Belgium in 1831.

Gustaaf Wappers (1803 – 1874) was a Belgian professor at the Royal Academy of Fine Arts of Antwerp in 1833 who gained fame for his paintings of patriotic themes following the recent independence of Belgium, especially his Burgomaster van der Werff in 1830. Patriotism for the incipient country was a major theme of the contemporary Romantic art movement, which led to several paintings focusing on scenes from the history of Belgium and the glorification of the Belgian revolutionaries.

== Composition ==
During the 19th century, the Belgian government began a program of producing artworks, literature, symbols, and rituals which would solidify the new state. Therefore, between 1834 and 1835, Wappers was commissioned by the government to create Episode of the Belgian Revolution of 1830 in order to extol the Belgian past.

The oil painting depicts a scene which is derived mainly from Jean-Baptiste Nothomb's eyewitness account of the revolution in his Essai historique et politique sur la révolution belge (lit. 'Historical and political essay on the Belgian revolution'). People of various social classes are shown as united in the resistance against the Dutch, positioned in a pyramidal shape. At the top, a man holding an anachronistic 1831 Belgian tricolor with the modern vertical stripes can be seen, however the stripes of all actual Belgian flags during the entire revolution (1830-31) were horizontal.

== Bibliography ==
- Marechal, Dominique; Musées royaux des Beaux-Arts de Belgique; ING Belgique SA; Musée Antoine Wiertz, eds. (2005). De romantiek in België: tussen werkelijkheid, herinnering en verlangen; [naar anleiding van de Tentoonstelling Romantiek in België in het kader van de 175ste verjaardag van België, Koninklijke Musea voor Schone Kunsten van België, Brussel, ING Cultuurcentrum, Brussel, Antoine Wiertzmuseum, Brussel, 18 maart - 31 juli 2005]. Brussel: Uitg. Lannoo. ISBN 978-90-209-6136-2. blz. 52-63
