= 752 Sulamitis =

Main-belt asteroid

Discovery
- Discovered by: G. Neujmin
- Discovery site: Simeiz Obs.
- Discovery date: 30 April 1913

Designations
- Pronunciation: /suːləˈmaɪtɪs/
- Named after: Shulamite (Hebrew Bible)
- Alternative designations: 1913 RL · 1936 FH_{1}
- Minor planet category: main-belt · (inner); Sulamitis

Orbital characteristics
- Epoch 23 March 2018 (JD 2458200.5)
- Uncertainty parameter 0
- Observation arc: 101.01 yr (36,894 d)
- Aphelion: 2.6457 AU (395.79 Gm)
- Perihelion: 2.2795 AU (341.01 Gm)
- Semi-major axis: 2.4626 AU (368.40 Gm)
- Eccentricity: 0.0743
- Orbital period (sidereal): 3.87 yr (1,412 d)
- Mean anomaly: 149.88°
- Mean motion: 0° 15^{m} 18^{s} / day
- Inclination: 5.9617°
- Longitude of ascending node: 85.120°
- Argument of perihelion: 23.880°

Physical characteristics
- Mean diameter: 60.17±0.25 km
- Synodic rotation period: 27.367 h
- Geometric albedo: 0.045±0.008
- Spectral type: C (assumed)
- Absolute magnitude (H): 10.3

752 Sulamitis /suːləˈmaɪtɪs/ is an asteroid from the inner regions of the asteroid belt, approximately 60 kilometers (37 miles) in diameter. It is the parent body of the Sulamitis family (408), a small family of 300 known carbonaceous asteroids. This asteroid is orbiting 2.46 AU from the Sun with a period of 3.87 years and an eccentricity of 0.0743. The orbital plane is inclined at an angle of 5.96° to the plane of the ecliptic.

Sulamitis was discovered on 30 April 1913 by Georgian–Russian astronomer Grigory Neujmin at the Simeiz Observatory on the Crimean peninsula, and given the provisional designation 1913 RL. It was named after the Shulamite, a beautiful woman mentioned in the book Solomon's Song of Songs of the Old Testament. The figure is possibly the Queen of Sheba in the Hebrew Bible.

Photometric observations of this asteroid collected during 2004–2005 show a rotation period of 27.367±0.005 h with a brightness variation of 0.20±0.03 magnitude. A hydration feature in the spectrum of 752 Sulamitis indicates the surface has undergone aqueous alteration. The same feature appears in most of its family members, suggesting the original body held water in some form.
