= Shlomi =

Shlomi or Shelomi is a Hebrew name (שלומי or in its Biblical spelling שלמי). It appears in the Bible once, in Numbers 34:27 as the father of Ahihud, the leader of the Tribe of Asher. It has become somewhat popular as a first name in Israel. It also serves as a substitute or pet form of the more traditional name Shlomo (שלמה).

The correct Biblical pronunciation is with the stress on the "mi", but most Israelis pronounce it with the stress on the "lo".

Shlomi means "My Shalom" where "Shalom" is well-being or peace. It may also mean "The Shalom of 'Y'" where "Y" is the Hebrew short for Jehovah, or possibly "having the property of Shalom." (= "Shalom-ful" in English).

Shlomi is also an Israeli development town in the north-west of Israel.

== People with the name ==
- Shlomi Arbeitman (born 1985), Israeli professional footballer
- Shlomi Dolev (born 1958), Israeli computer science professor
- Shlomi Eyal (1959–2019), Israeli Olympic fencer
- Shlomi Haimy (born 1989), Israeli Olympic mountain cyclist
- Shlomi Harush (born 1987), Israeli basketball player
- Shlomi Shabat (born 1954), Israeli singer
- Vince Offer (born Offer Shlomi; 1964), Israeli-American infomercial pitchman known as "The ShamWow Guy"
- A character in Bonjour Monsieur Shlomi, Israeli film

== See also ==
- Shlomit (disambiguation)
