= Shlomit (given name) =

Shlomit, Shlomith, Shelomith or Shelomit, etc. (Hebrew: שלומית) is a Hebrew-language feminine given name.

Notable people with the name include:

- Salome, Jewish princess, the daughter of Herod II and princess Herodias
- Salome (disambiguation) includes several other Jewish women named שלומית
- Shelomith bat Dibri, the daughter of Dibri of the house of Dan, in the Book of Leviticus
- Several minor Hebrew Bible figures, see List of minor Hebrew Bible figures, L–Z#Shelomith
  - Shelomith bat Dibri, mother of a person who blasphemed
- Shlomit Aharon (born 1950), Israeli singer
- Schlomit Baytelman (born 1949), Israeli-born actress, director, and writer who became a naturalized Chilean citizen
- Schlomith Flaum (1893–1963), Lithuanian Zionist activist
- Shlomith Haber-Schaim (born 1926), Israeli artist
- Shlomit Levi, Israeli singer
- Shlomit Malka (born 1993), Israeli fashion model and television host
- Shlomit Nir (born 1952), Israeli swimmer
- Shlomit C. Schuster (1951–2016), Israeli philosophical counselor

== Fictional characters ==
- Shelomith, fictional character in Judas, My Brother

== See also ==
- Shulamith (disambiguation)
- Shlomi (disambiguation)
- Shulamite (disambiguation)
- Sulamith
- Shelomit seal
