= Shulamith School for Girls =

Private, Jewish day school in New York

Coordinates: 40°37′6.4″N 73°57′39.5″W

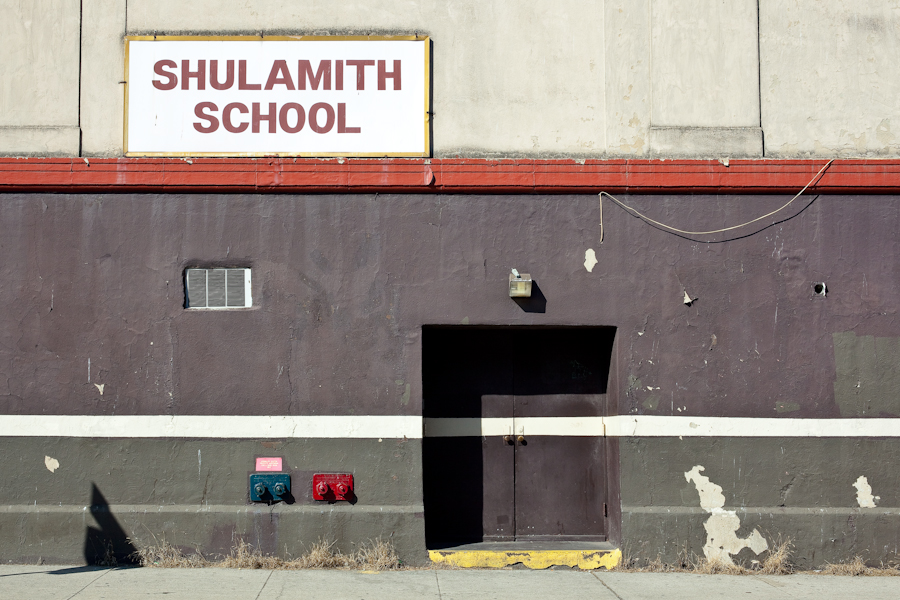

Location
- 60 West End Avenue, Brooklyn, NY 11235 (Shulamith of Brooklyn); 305 Cedarhurst Avenue, Cedarhurst, NY 11516 (Shulamith of Long Island)

Information
- Type: Private, Jewish day school
- Religious affiliation: Judaism
- Denomination: Modern Orthodox
- Established: 1930
- Principals (Brooklyn): Rabbi Moshe Monczyk and Mrs. Ana Mandelbaum
- Principals (Long Island): Esther Kirschenbaum (Early Childhood), Joyce Yarmak (Lower Division), Rookie Billet & Dr. Evelyn Gross (Middle Division), Sara Munk & Danyel Goldberg (High School)
- Grades: PK–12
- Gender: Girls
- Athletics conference: MYHSAL
- Mascot: Mustangs
- Accreditation: MSA
- Website: www.shulamithofbrooklyn.org (Brooklyn) www.shulamith.org (Long Island)

Shulamith School for Girls is a Centrist Orthodox Jewish school. It was the first Orthodox Jewish elementary school for girls in North America. The name Shulamith (Hebrew: שולמית) is a feminine form of the Hebrew name Solomon, which loosely translates to "peace". In July 2010, the organization was divided into two institutions which operated independent schools in Brooklyn and Long Island.

== History ==
The school was founded in 1930 by Bertha Blazer Schraeter, together with Nacha Rivkin and Rabbi M.G. Volk at 4910 14th Avenue in Borough Park, Brooklyn. From 1941, Dr. Judith Lieberman served as Hebrew principal and later as dean of Hebrew studies. Shulamith moved to 1277 East 14th Street in Midwood which originally housed Vitagraph Studios.

In July 2010, Shulamith was divided into two schools: the Shulamith School for Girls of Long Island, and the Shulamith School for Girls of Brooklyn. Each has its own board, administration, and finances.

The four divisions of Shulamith School for Girls of Long Island serve 600 students: Early Childhood in Woodmere (Principal Esther Kirschbaum), Grades 1-8 ( Principal Dr. Evelyn Gross) and High School (principal Sara Munk and Danyel Goldberg).

Shulamith of Brooklyn serves students from preschool through twelfth grade. The high school was founded in 1980 with Dr. Susan Katz serving as principal. She retired in 2007. Shulamith High School was recognized with the Blue Ribbon School Award of Excellence by the United States Department of Education. The high school is Middle States Accredited.

Under the leadership of the new board of directors and Menahel (Chairman) Rabbi Shmuel Klammer, the Shulamith School of Brooklyn began to flourish, with near-record enrollment in the Pre-School program.

Post graduation, students have pursued professional careers in law, medicine, nursing, pharmacy, business, and others. Graduates pursued their advanced education at some of the most recognized universities across the nation including Harvard, Columbia, Cornell, Princeton, Yale, New York University, Yeshiva University, SUNY colleges, CUNY colleges, etc. Most graduates spend a year studying in Israel.

== Facilities ==
The Long Island school has taken over the #5 School from the Lawrence Cedarhurst School District. This school is centrally located in the 5 Towns and contains a 400-seat fixed seating auditorium, gym, 30 classrooms, and outdoor playgrounds.

Shulamith of Brooklyn, which was located at 1277 East 14th Street in Midwood for decades, is currently located on two full floors of The Manhattan Beach Jewish Center at 60 West End Avenue. The pre-school is housed in three modern fully equipped classroom modules adjacent to the main building. There is a full gym for physical education and team sports, and the synagogue sanctuary is used for plays and assemblies.

== Educational philosophy ==
Classes at Shulamith are conducted Ivrit b'Ivrit. Shulamith schools focus intensely on textual learning and skill development in Judaic studies such as Navi, Halacha, Mishnah, Ketuvim, and Chumash. It's important for the girls to be able to open a Tanach and learn independently. In addition, Shulamith is unabashedly Zionist in its orientation. Girls are provided with the educational, social, and emotional tools needed to succeed on any path. The general studies program covers all the basics of the NY State curriculum plus advanced computer skills, STEM programs including robotics, and many other opportunities for the girls to excel in a competitive environment.

== Extracurricular activities ==
Shulamith participates in the Salute to Israel Parade and the International Bible Contest (Chidon HaTanach). They also have a school bowl team called the "Torah Bowl" and compete with other (Yeshivot) schools in the NY area. Shulamith School for Girls also stages annual music, dance, and drama productions.

The student newspaper, the Kaleidoscope, won the Columbia Scholastic Press Association Silver Crown in 1995. The student literary magazine Serendipity won the National Scholastic Press Association Gold Circle Award for Humor in 1997. Students may attend the Bais Yaakov Convention. Shulamith also competes in an all-Yeshiva league in basketball, volleyball and softball. The Shulamith mock trial team, which has victoriously won countless competitions, was first instituted in 1999. The high school division offer other extracurricular activities including the Math Team, the Math Magazine, the National Honor Society, the Student Body President Committee, Model Congress, yearbook, the Debate Team, and a weekly foreign language newspaper called Sidra. Students participating in the extracurricular activities have won countless awards, championships, medals, and trophies.
