= Mosh Ben-Ari =

Israeli musician (born 1970)

Mosh Ben-Ari מוש בן ארי
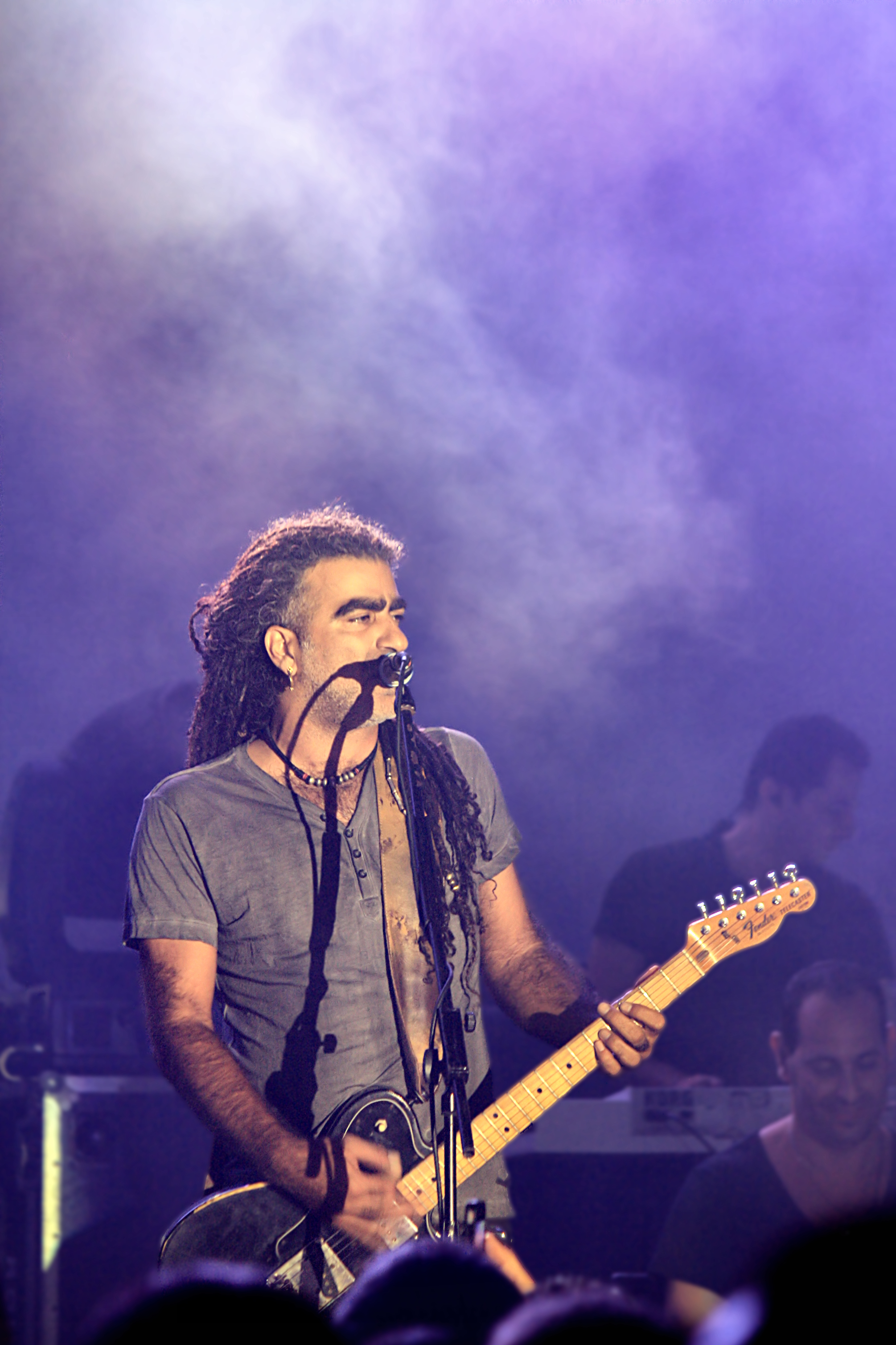
- Ben-Ari in 2013

Background information
- Born: 26 September 1970 (age 55); Afula, Israel
- Genres: World music; rock
- Occupations: Musician; lyricist; composer
- Instruments: Guitar; sarod; tar; cümbüş; sintir; bass; vocals
- Years active: 1995–present
- Formerly of: Sheva

Moshe "Mosh" Ben-Ari (Hebrew: מוש בן ארי; born 21 September 1970) is an Israeli musician, lyricist, and composer.

== Biography ==
Ben-Ari was born in Afula, Israel, to a family of Mizrahi Jewish background. He first discovered music as a child through the traditional Jewish and ethnic chants that were part of his everyday life. He started playing music at the age of 16 and has since studied music around the world, including in India, the Sahara, and the Sinai. He plays various string instruments including acoustic and classic guitar, Indian sarod, Persian tar, Turkish cümbüş, Moroccan sintir, and bass.

In 1997, together with a few friends, he founded the world music ensemble Sheva (שבע, Seven). The band members come from Muslim and Jewish backgrounds and the main theme in their songs is the call for peace in the Middle East and around the world. Their first album, Ha,^{K}hatunah HaShmeemeet (החתונה השמימית, "Heavenly Wedding" or "Celestial Marriage") featured the hit song Salaam ("סאלאם", from Arabic: سلام), also known as ′Od Yavo′ Shalom ′Aleynu ("עוד יבוא שלום עלינו"lit. "Still, it will come, Peace upon us"). The band has released four studio albums and one live album.

In 2001, Ben-Ari's debut solo album, Ad Elay ("עד אלי", "Unto me"), came out. In 2004, he released his second album, Derekh ("דרך", "Way" or "Path"). This album quickly went Gold in Israel. In 2006, Ben-Ari's third album, Masa UMatan ("Negotiations" lit. "Journey and Provision" "מסע ומתן"), was released.

All of Ben-Ari's albums have been produced by Globalev World Music, in Israel. His music is a blend of rock, soul, reggae, and world music.

Ben-Ari was featured in Central Park's Summerstage Tour on 29 June 2008.

Mosh Ben-Ari served as coach and mentor on the third season of the television singing competition The Voice Israel.

== Discography ==
=== with Sheva ===
- החתונה השמיימית (Celestial Wedding – 1997)
- יום ולילה (Day & Night – 1999)
- גן (Garden - 2002)
- Live in Australia (2005)
- Sheva (2006)

=== Solo ===
- Ad Elay (2001)
- Derech (2004)
- Masa UMatan (2006)
- Ad Elai (2007)
- Enshom (2009)
- תסתכל לי בעיניים (Look me in the eye – 2011)
- Soof (2013)
- כמו בחיים (Lifelike – 2013)
- Kmo Ba'haim (2013)
