= Salaam (song) =

Peace song by Mosh Ben-Ari

Salaam (Hebrew: סלאם) or Od Yavo Shalom Aleinu (Hebrew: עוד יבוא שלום עלינו) is a peace song by Mosh Ben-Ari, composed while he was in the band Sheva. It is sung in Hebrew and Arabic and has gained popularity in Israeli folk music, especially within the context of the Arab–Israeli conflict.

The song typically begins slowly and somewhat plaintively, and, as it repeats, gradually increases in tempo and excitement.
