= Congregation Beth Shalom (Clifton Park, New York) =

Unaffiliated synagogue in upstate New York, US

- Location in upstate New York

Religion
- Affiliation: Judaism
- Rite: Unaffiliated
- Ecclesiastical or organizational status: Synagogue
- Leadership: Rabbi Ami T. Monson (Rabbi in Residence); Rabbi Chanan Markowitz (Emeritus)
- Status: Active

Location
- Location: 688 Clifton Park Center Road, Clifton Park, New York 12065
- Country: United States
- Interactive map of Congregation Beth Shalom
- Coordinates: 42°51′27″N 73°49′35″W

Architecture
- Established: 1974 (as a congregation)
- Completed: 1975

Website
- bethshalomcp.com

Congregation Beth Shalom is an unaffiliated Jewish congregation and synagogue, located at 688 Clifton Park Center Road, in Clifton Park, New York, in the United States. It is the only synagogue in southern Saratoga County. According to its own report, in 2016 the congregation was losing members.

Beth Shalom was founded in 1974 as a Conservative congregation. However, in c. 2005 it withdrew from the United Synagogue of Conservative Judaism, and as of 2024 continued unaffiliated. The synagogue building was completed in 1975.

Beverly Magidson served as rabbi from 1983 to 1991. Magidson was the first female rabbi appointed to lead a Conservative congregation in the United States. Magidson was also the synagogue's first full-time rabbi. As of 2024, Rabbi Ami T. Monson was the Rabbi in Residence; and Rabbi Dr. Chanan Markowitz was Rabbi Emeritus.
