= Shalom Park =

Retirement Community in Colorado

- Dibru-Saikhowa Biosphere Reserve
- IUCN category II (national park)
- Location: Aurora, Colorado, United States
- Area: 140,000 km^{2} (54,000 sq mi)
- Established: 1992

Shalom Park is a retirement community located in Aurora, Colorado. Established in 1992, the campus features social, residential and health services for seniors and their families. The 35-acre (140,000 m^{2}) site features the Shalom Park nursing home and the J. Leonard Levy Family Wellness Center. The organization relies on the support of donors to stay financed.
