= Shelomith bat Dibri =

Female biblical figure in Leviticus 24:11

Shelomith bat Dibri (Hebrew: שלומית בת דברי) is the only woman named in the Book of Leviticus. Her story is found in Leviticus 24:10-23. The focus of the passage is on Shelomith's son who committed blasphemy and was stoned to death.

== Shelomith in biblical narrative ==
Leviticus 24:10–23 tells the story of a half-Israelite man whose name is not noted in the text. He was the son of an Israelite mother, Shelomith, a daughter of Dibri of the tribe of Dan. His father, an Egyptian, goes unnamed, as well. Shelomith's son, in a quarrel with another Israelite, blasphemed against God, using the Divine Name. As a result, the Israelites brought him to Moses, and he was held in custody until a decision could be made (verse 12) about his punishment. Leviticus states that the Lord instructed Moses that he should be stoned. Therefore, Shelomith's son was stoned to death by the Israelites.

== Rabbinic tradition ==
The rabbis in Vayikra Rabba learn from her name that she would speak to everyone. "She would say doveret "Shalom to you, shalom to you."

Midrash Tanchuma relates that Shelomit was raped by the Egyptian taskmaster who was in charge of her husband. One night, the Egyptian instructed Shelomit's husband to round up his team of men. While he was out of the house, the Egyptian entered his home, impersonated her husband and raped Shelomit. Afterwards, her husband realized what had happened, and the taskmaster beat him severely. Moses saw the beating and said, "Was it not enough that this wicked raped his wife, he should not return and beat him?" Immediately, "And he looked this way and that way, and when he saw that there was no man, he smote the Egyptian, and hid him in the sand," (Exodus 2:12).

== Popular culture ==
In Wilda Gafney's book Womanist Midrash: A Reintroduction to the Women of the Torah and the Throne Shelomith is one featured woman. Gafney presents Shelomith's story from a womanist point of view. Gafney describes Shelomith's identity as a woman from the tribe of Dan, the only woman named in the book of Leviticus, a mother, and a possible victim. Gafney writes, "Shelomith is the mother of a child who was accused - rightly or wrongly - of a crime, imprisonment, and executed." This interpretation leads Gafney to connect Shelomith with women of color in the United States, especially mothers of children of color who have found themselves in the criminal justice system.
