= Sulamith =

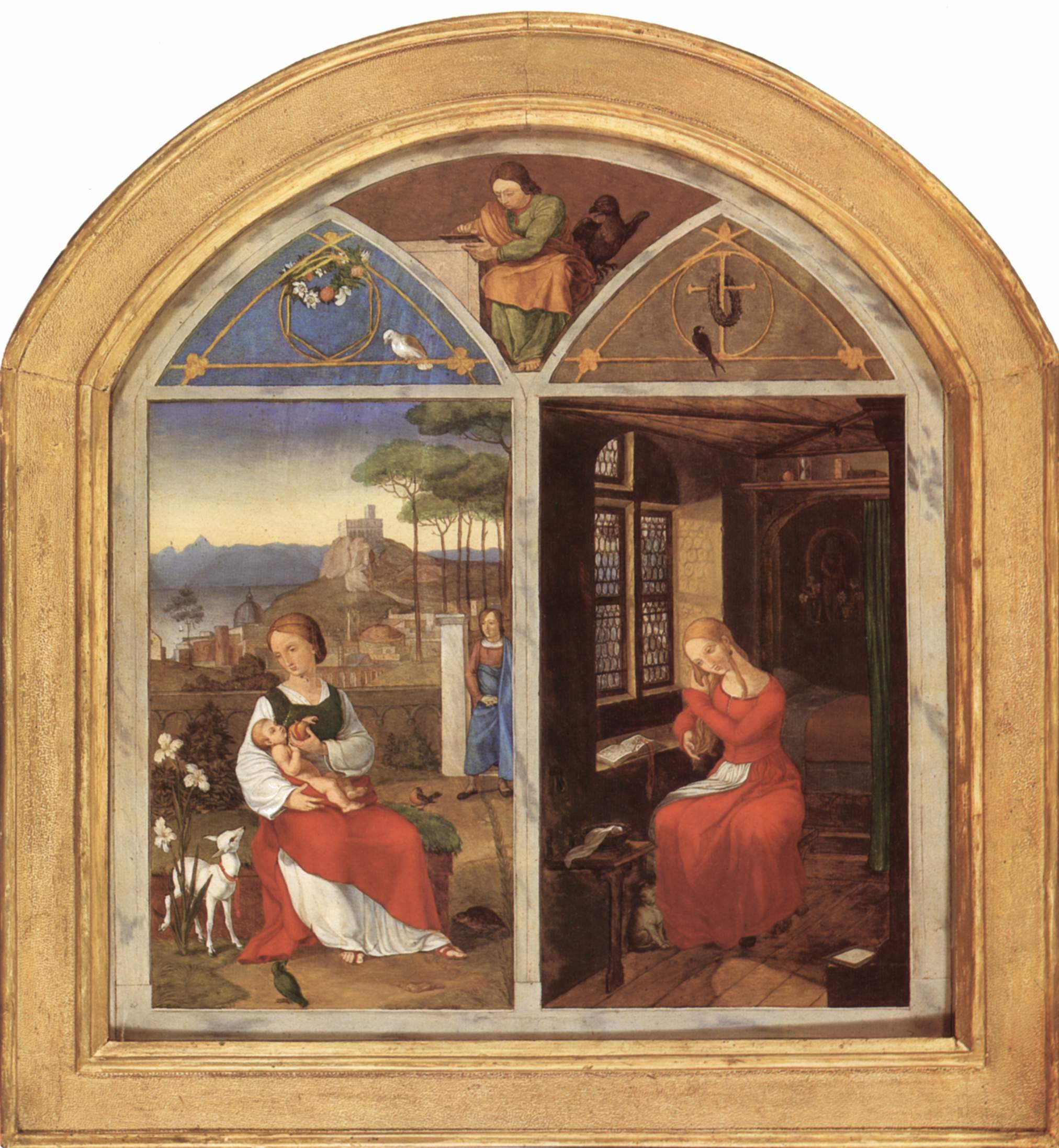

Sulamith may refer to:

People

- Sulamith Goldhaber (1923–1965), high-energy physicist and molecular spectroscopist
- Sulamith Ish-Kishor (1896–1977), American writer
- Sulamith Isman (1925–1943), Dutch girl killed in Auschwitz
- Sulamith Messerer (1908–2004), Russian ballerina and choreographer
- Sulamith Wülfing (1901–1989), German artist and illustrator

In fiction

- Sulamith in Paul Celan's 1948 poem "Death Fugue" ("Todesfuge")

== See also ==
- Shulamite
- Shulamith (disambiguation)
