= Shlomtzion =

Shlomtzion (Hebrew: שְׁלוֹמְצִיּוֹן) may refer to:

- Shlomtzion (political party), a defunct political party in Israel founded by Ariel Sharon
- Queen Salome Alexandra of Judea (141–67 BC)
