= Beth Sholom Congregation and Talmud Torah =

Modern Orthodox synagogue in Potomac, Maryland, US

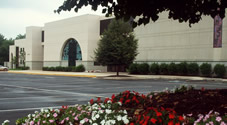
- Beth Sholom Synagogue

- Location within Maryland

Religion
- Affiliation: Modern Orthodox Judaism
- Rite: Ashkenazi and Sephardi
- Ecclesiastical or organisational status: Synagogue
- Leadership: Nissan Antine, Sr Rabbi; Eitan Cooper, Associate
- Status: Active

Location
- Location: Seven Locks Road, Potomac, Maryland
- Country: United States
- Coordinates: 39°03′04″N 77°09′48″W

Architecture
- Established: 1908 (as a congregation)
- Groundbreaking: 1994
- Completed: 1938 (Pethworth); 1954 (Shepherd Park); 1994 & 1999 (Potomac)

Website
- bethsholom.org

Beth Sholom Congregation and Talmud Torah (abbreviated as BSCTT) is a Modern Orthodox synagogue on Seven Locks Road in Potomac, Maryland, in the United States. The largest Orthodox synagogue in the Washington metropolitan area, it is led by Rabbi Nissan Antine.

== Religious services and programs ==
Beth Sholom Congregation holds morning and evening tefillah services, Shabbat services, High Holidays services, and Shalosh Regalim services.

Beth Sholom Congregation hosts adult education classes and study groups. The congregation has a men's club, a sisterhood, and a social action committee. Beth Sholom hosts classes for school-age children and teenagers as well. while Beth Sholom Early Childhood Center has classes for younger children.

== Leadership ==
Antine became Beth Sholom's assistant in 2006 and was promoted to senior rabbi in July 2013, replacing Joel Tessler. Rabbi Tessler became Rabbi Emeritus.

Rabbanit Hadas Fruchter served as the assistant spiritual leader of Beth Sholom Congregation from 2016 through 2019. Rabbanit Fruchter still serves as a halachic adviser for women.

Rabbi Eitan Cooper is the Associate Rabbi.

== History ==
=== Origins ===
The congregation was founded in 1908 as Voliner Anshe Sfard. It initially worshiped in a congregant's house, but soon purchased a store and remodeled it as a synagogue building, with separate men and women sections. Within just a few years of its creation, the congregation had bought its own cemetery.

The Voliner Anshe Sfard Congregation joined with the Har Zion Congregation in 1936 under the name Beth Sholom Congregation and Talmud Torah, complete with its own Hebrew school.

Two years later, the combined congregation spent $100,000 on a new building. The new building, located at Eighth and Shepherd streets in Petworth, Washington, D.C., was dedicated on August 14, 1938, and served the community for 18 years.

=== Shepherd Park ===
The congregation sold the Eighth and Shepherd building to the Allegheny Conference Association of Seventh-day Adventists and moved out of the building on December 24, 1954. The congregation temporarily moved to a former bank building at Alaska and Georgia avenues in Shepherd Park, and religious classes were temporarily held at Sixteenth Street and Fort Stevens Drive NW in Brightwood, while it built a new building at Thirteenth Street and Eastern Avenue NW in Shepherd Park. Construction of the new building on Eastern Avenue cost $900,000.

The congregation held its first religious services in the new building on September 14, 1954. The new building had seating for 2,000 worshippers. At one point, the Hebrew school had more than 400 students.

=== Potomac ===
By 1975, many of the members of the congregation had moved to Montgomery County, Maryland, and only one-fifth of the seats in the sanctuary were filled for Shabbat services. The congregation's leadership decided to build a chapel and a religious school on Seven Locks Road in Potomac. It was considered a branch synagogue. The new location in Potomac worked out; the congregation's membership increased by ten percent, and the religious school's enrollment increased ten-fold.

In the late 1980s, Beth Sholom was principally responsible for the construction of a two-mile-long eruv in Potomac that made it permissible for observant Orthodox Jews to carry and push objects within the boundaries area on Shabbat, leading to the growth of the Orthodox population in the area.

In order to accommodate its large community, the congregation constructed a new building on the Potomac site in 1994. In 1999, the second phase of the building was completed.

In 2005, the synagogue became the first Orthodox congregation in Washington to elect a woman as president of the congregation. As of 2012, the congregation numbered more than four-hundred families.

== See also ==
- History of the Jews in Maryland
