= Beth Shalom Congregation (Columbia, Maryland) =

Conservative synagogue in Columbia, Maryland

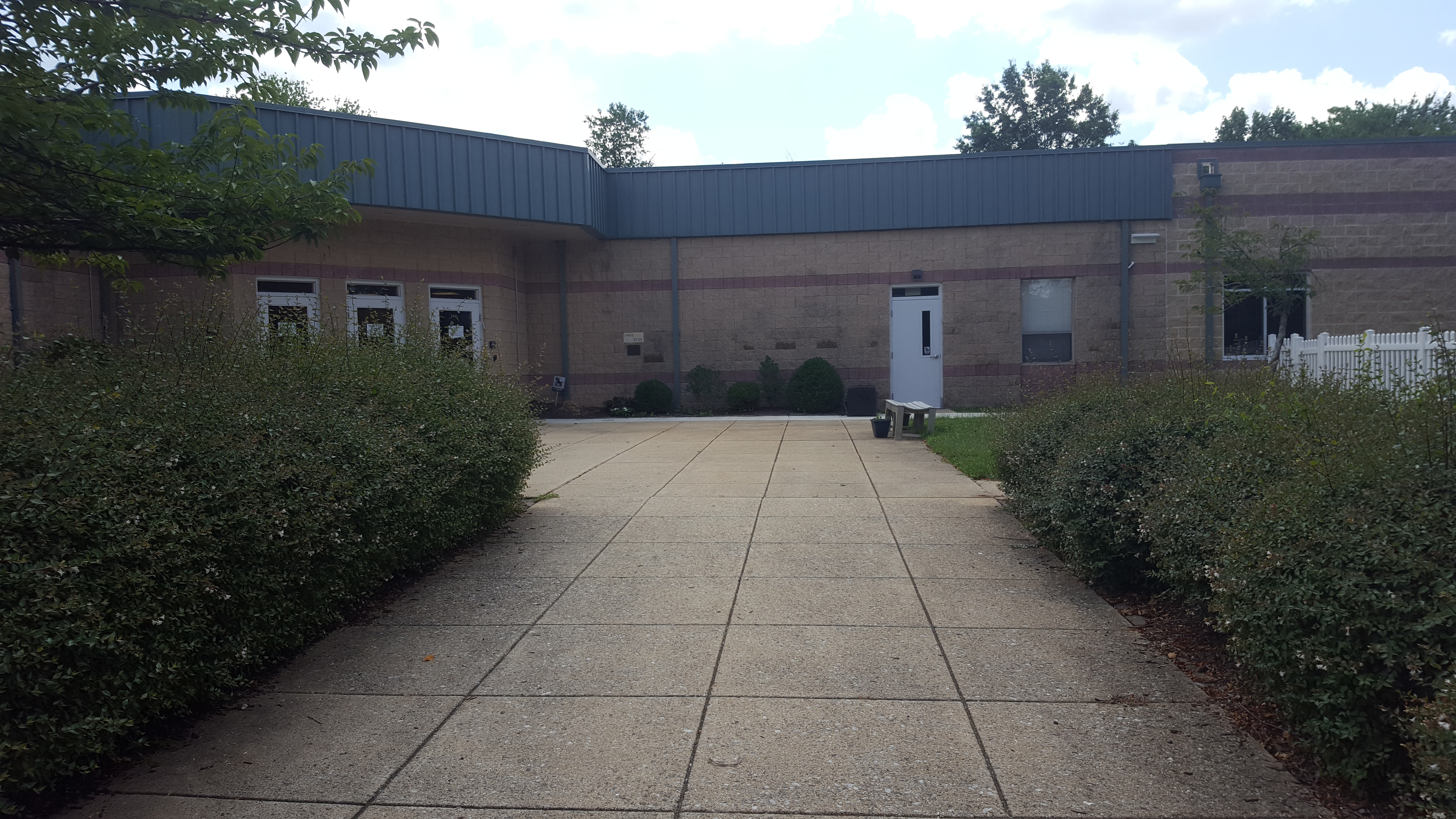
- Beth Shalom synagogue, in 2019

- Location within Maryland

Religion
- Affiliation: Conservative Judaism
- Ecclesiastical or organizational status: Synagogue
- Leadership: Rabbi Jennifer Romano Greenspan
- Status: Active

Location
- Location: 8070 Harriet Tubman Lane, Columbia, Maryland
- Country: United States
- Interactive map of Beth Shalom Congregation
- Coordinates: 39°11′04″N 76°52′45″W

Architecture
- Established: 1969 (as a congregation)

Website
- beth-shalom.net

Beth Shalom Congregation is a Conservative Jewish congregation and synagogue, located at 8070 Harriet Tubman Lane, in Columbia, Maryland, in the United States. It is the only Conservative congregation in Howard County.

== History ==
When the town of Columbia was formed in the 1960s, in accordance with an idea of James Rouse, an Interfaith Center was created where all places of worship in the town would initially share a hall.

The attempt to first organize a Jewish community in the Columbia area began in 1967. Temple Solel (now known as Temple Isaiah) became the area's Reform temple, and Beth Shalom became the area's Conservative congregation. Both have since obtained their own buildings.

Beth Shalom was founded in 1969. It has since grown to approximately 250 families.

== Rabbinical leaders ==
The following individuals have served as rabbi of Beth Shalom:

Ordinal	Officeholder	Term start	Term end	Time in office	Notes
1	Noah Golinkin	1978	1986	7–8 years	
2	Kenneth Cohen	1986	1997	10–11 years	
3	Susan Grossman	1997	2022	24–25 years	
4	Jennifer Romano Greenspan	July 1, 2022	incumbent	4 years, 29 days	

Grossman was ordained in 1985 at a time when female rabbis in the Conservative movement were considered to be unusual. Grossman is known for authoring works on the Conservative view of ritual purity.

== See also ==
- History of the Jews in Maryland
