= Shulamit Shalit =

Israeli author

Shulamit Shalit (Hebrew: שולמית שליט), also known as Shulamit Shalit-Rudnik (Hebrew: שולמית שליט-רודניק; born in 1939) is an Israeli writer, journalist and essayist. Her writings are mostly in Russian.

== Biography and work ==
She was born in Lithuania and moved to Israel in 1980.

Since 1991 she was the host and an author of the radio program Literary Pages of Israel Radio International, where she released over 200 radio-essays in literature and music. She published many essays in literary science in Russophone publications in Israel, Russia, and United States. She is an author and editor of the series of collections "Jews in the Culture of the Russian Diaspora" (Евреи в культуре русского Зарубежья).

She was instrumental in opening the Maria and Mikhail Tsetlin Museum of Russian Art in Ramat Gan and two of her books are devoted to the museum and Tsetlin family.

In 2015 she was awarded Prize of the Union of Russian-Speaking Writers of Israel in prose category.

== Books ==
- 2012 Печать любви [Pechat Lyubvi, A Seal of Love]
  - 2015: חותם של אהבה [Hotam shel ahavah], ISBN 9655558150
- 2003: (with Elena Zhukova) The Maria and Mikhail Zetlin Art Collection, Department of Museums, Ramat Gan ISBN 9659054505
- 2005: На круги свои (a phrase from Ecclesiastes 1: ru:На круги своя, In circulos suos regreditur) Jerusalem, Philobiblon
- 1996: "С одним народом я скорблю" : к открытию Музея русского искусства им. Mарии и Михаила Цетлиных в Рамат-Гане, Израиль, "Skopus", Israel

== Essays about notable persons ==
- About Alter Druyanov: "Король еврейской шутки"
- About Vladimir Admoni:
- About Leah Goldberg: "Раз позволено жить — нужно любить"
- About Maria Petrovykh: ""Я домолчалась до стихов..." О Марии Петровых, поэте и переводчике"
- About Dave Tarras: "Король клейзмеров Дэйв Таррас (1897-1989)"
