= Shulamite =

Biblical figure

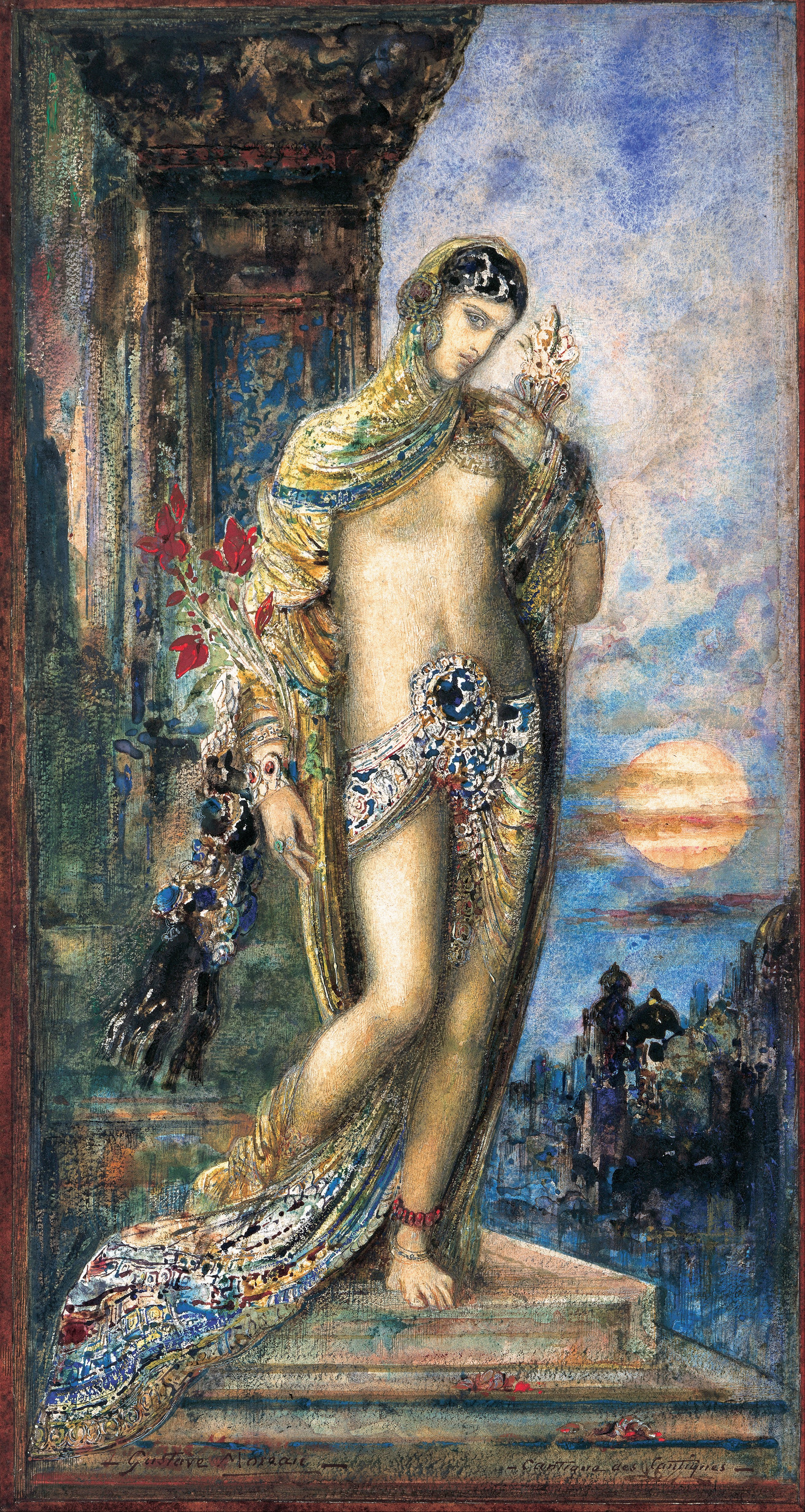
Gustave Moreau, Song of Songs: The Shulammite Maiden

A Shulamite (or Shulammite; Biblical Hebrew: שׁוּלַמִּית, romanized: Šūlammîṯ, Koine Greek: Σουλαμῖτις, romanized: Soulamîtis, Medieval Latin: Sūlamītis) is the woman in Hebrew Bible, a lover of King Solomon, mentioned by this appellation twice in the "Song of Songs".

== Background ==
She is most likely called the Shulammite because she came from an unidentified place called Shulem. Many scholars consider Shulammite to be synonymous with Shunammite ('person from Shunem'). Shunem was a village in the territory of Issachar, north of Jezreel and south of Mount Gilboa. Other scholars link Shulem with Salem, believing Solomon's bride was from Jerusalem. Still others believe that the title Shulammite ('peaceful') is simply the bride's married name, being the feminine form of Solomon ('peaceful') and only used after her marriage to the king.

Solomon uses passionate language to describe his bride and their love (Song 4:1–15). Solomon clearly loved the Shulammite—and he admired her character as well as her beauty (Song 6:9). Everything about the Song of Solomon portrays the fact that this bride and groom were passionately in love and that there was mutual respect and friendship, as well (Song 8:6–7).

== Shulamite in culture ==
=== Art ===
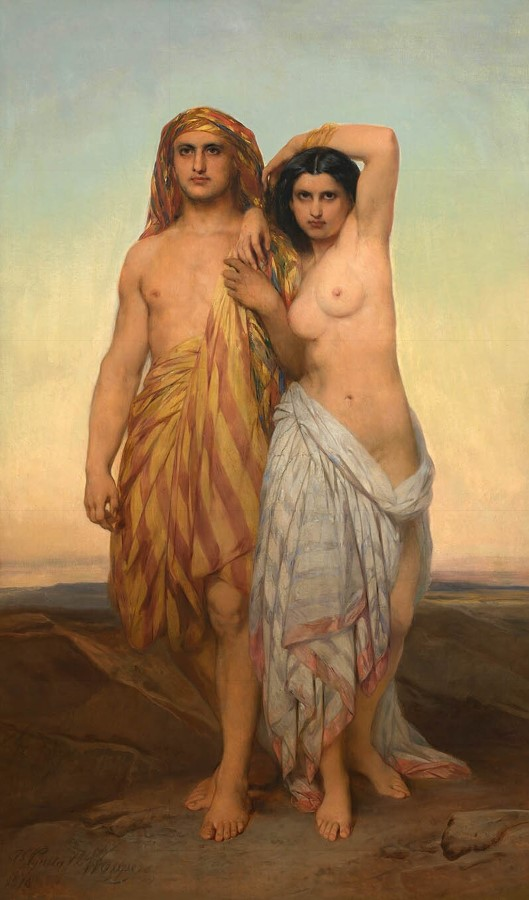
Gustaf Wappers, The Shulammite, 1870

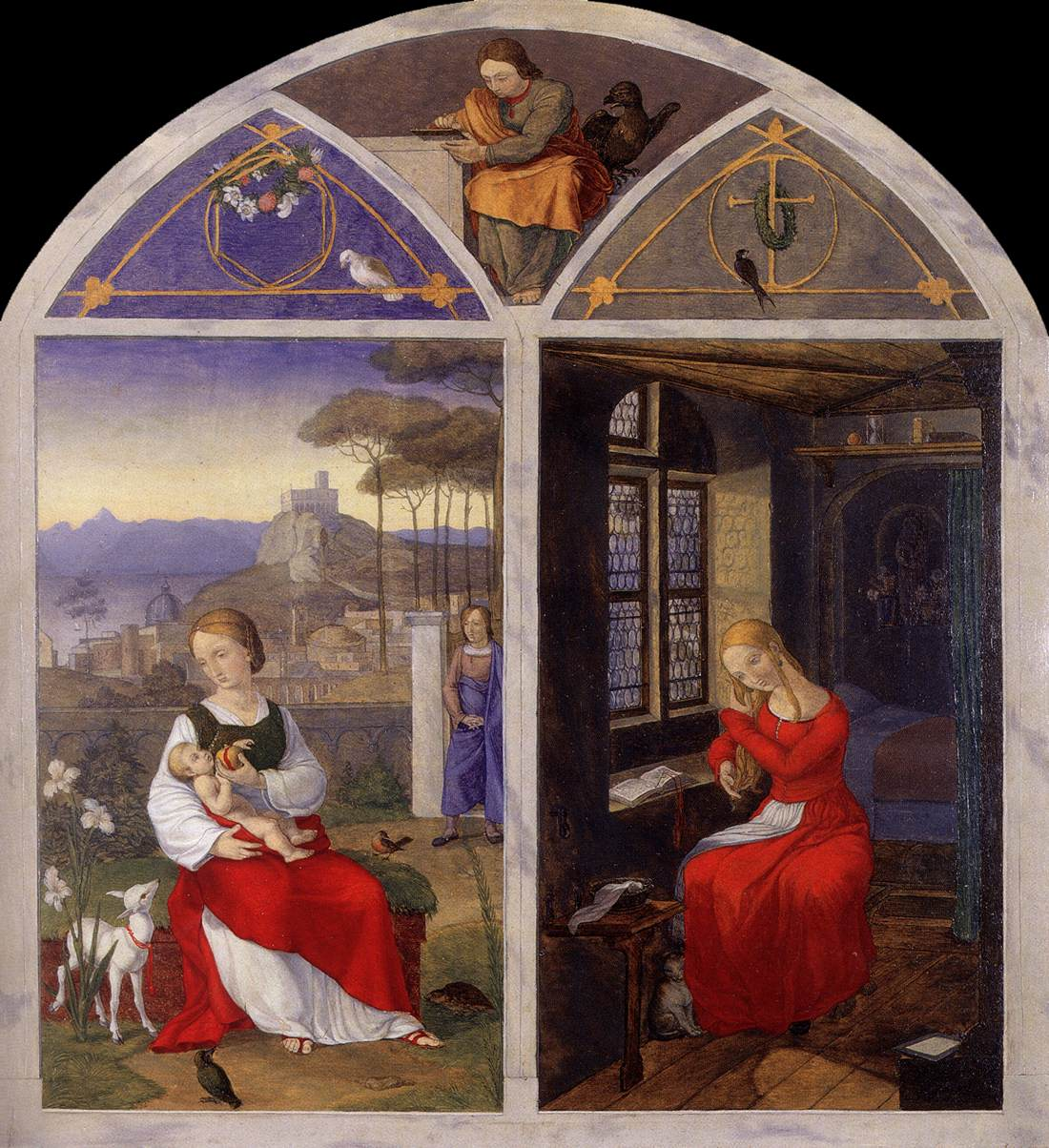
Franz Pforr, Maria and Shulammite, 1811

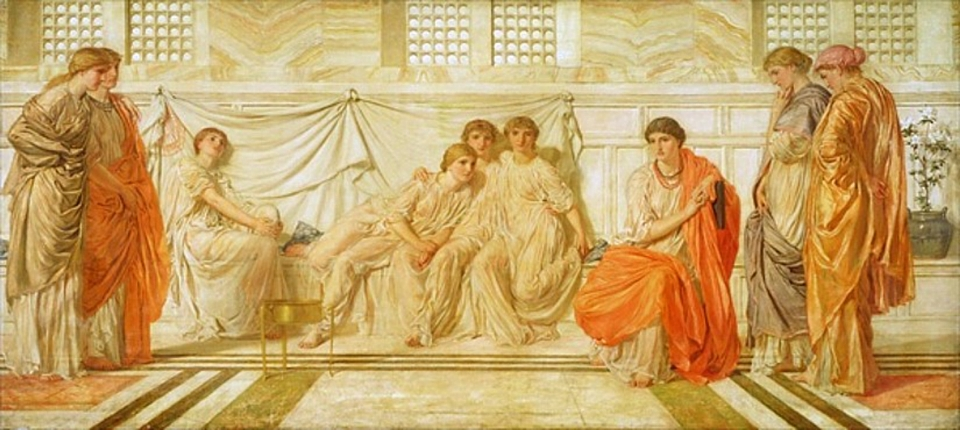
Albert Joseph Moore, The Shulamite relating the Glories of King Solomon to her Maidens, 1894

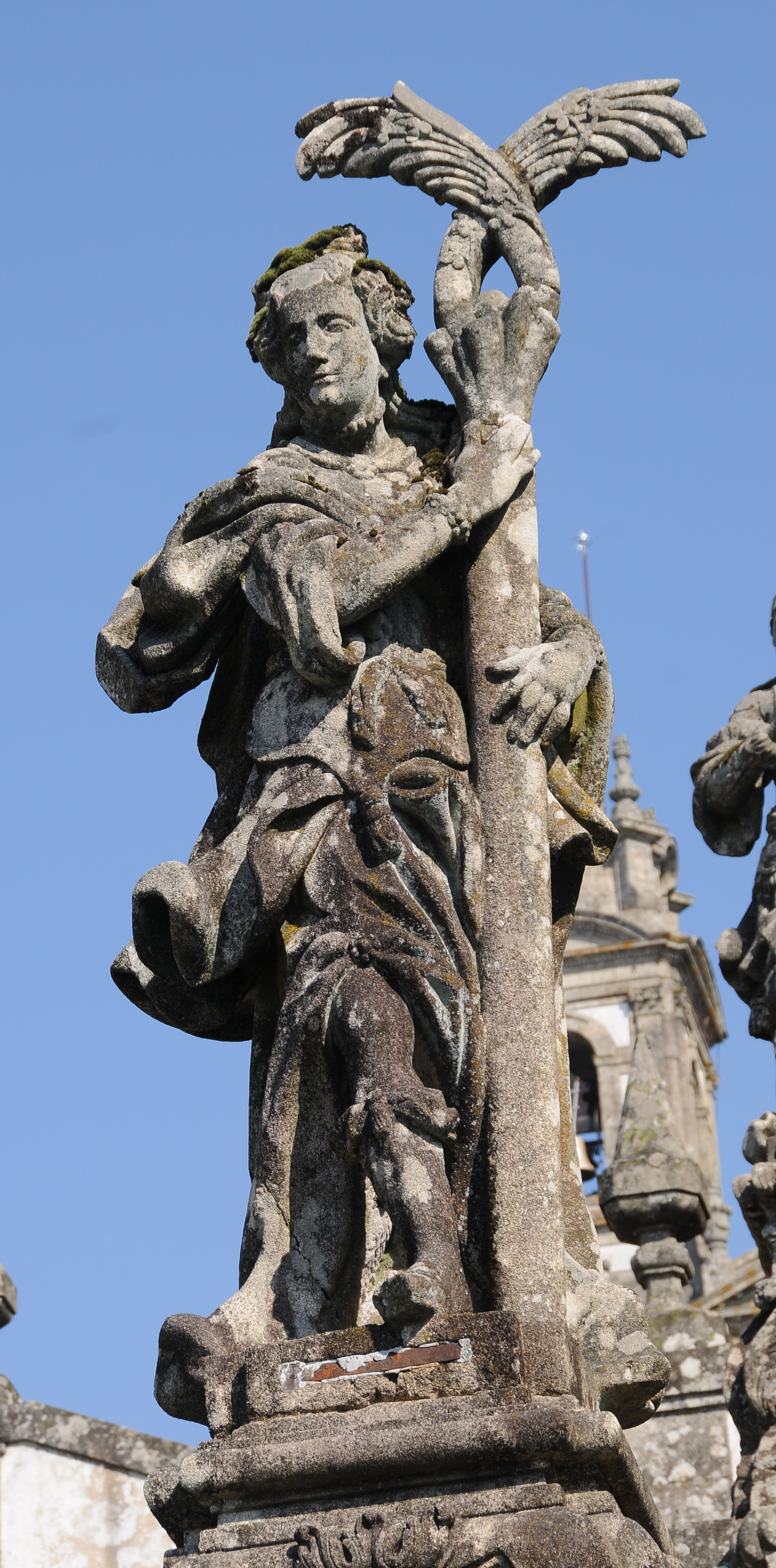
Statue in Bom Jesus do Monte

== See also ==
- Shunamitism
