= Salim =

Salim, Saleem or Selim may refer to:

== People ==
- Salim (name), or Saleem or Salem or Selim, a name of Arabic origin
  - Salim (poet) (1800–1866), Kurdish poet
  - Saleem (playwright), Palestinian-American gay Muslim playwright, actor, DJ, and dancer
  - Selim I (1470–1520), the Ottoman sultan reigned 1512–1520
  - Selim II (1524–1574), the Ottoman sultan reigned 1566–1574
  - Selim III (1761–1808), the Ottoman sultan reigned 1789–1807
  - Salim, birth name of Mughal Emperor Jahangir (1569–1627)
- Selim people, an ethnic group of Sudan

== Fictional characters ==
- Selim Bradley, in Fullmetal Alchemist
- Pasha Selim, in Mozart's opera Die Entführung aus dem Serail
- Saleem Sinai, in Midnight's Children
- Salim Othman, in House of Ashes
- Salim, in the 1999 Indian film Sarfarosh, portrayed by Mukesh Rishi

== Places ==
- Salim, Iran (disambiguation)
- Salem, Ma'ale Iron, or Salim, Israel
- Selim, Yenipazar, Turkey
- Selim, Kars, Turkey
  - Selim District, Turkey
  - Selim railway station
- Salim, Nablus, West Bank

== Other uses ==
- Salim (film), a 2014 Indian Tamil-language action thriller film
- Saleem (film), a 2009 Indian Telugu-language film
- Selim (horse) (1802–1825), 19th-century Thoroughbred racehorse
- Salim Group, an Indonesian conglomerate
- Salim (Thai slang), a political slang in Thai
- Shalim, or Salim, a Canaanite god
- Grains of Selim, an African spice

== See also ==
- Ænon near Salim, place named in the Gospel of John
- Salaam (disambiguation)
- Salem (disambiguation)
  - Salem (name)
- Salimi (disambiguation)
- Slim (name)
- Š-L-M, the triconsonantal root of many Semitic words
