= List of soul foods and dishes =

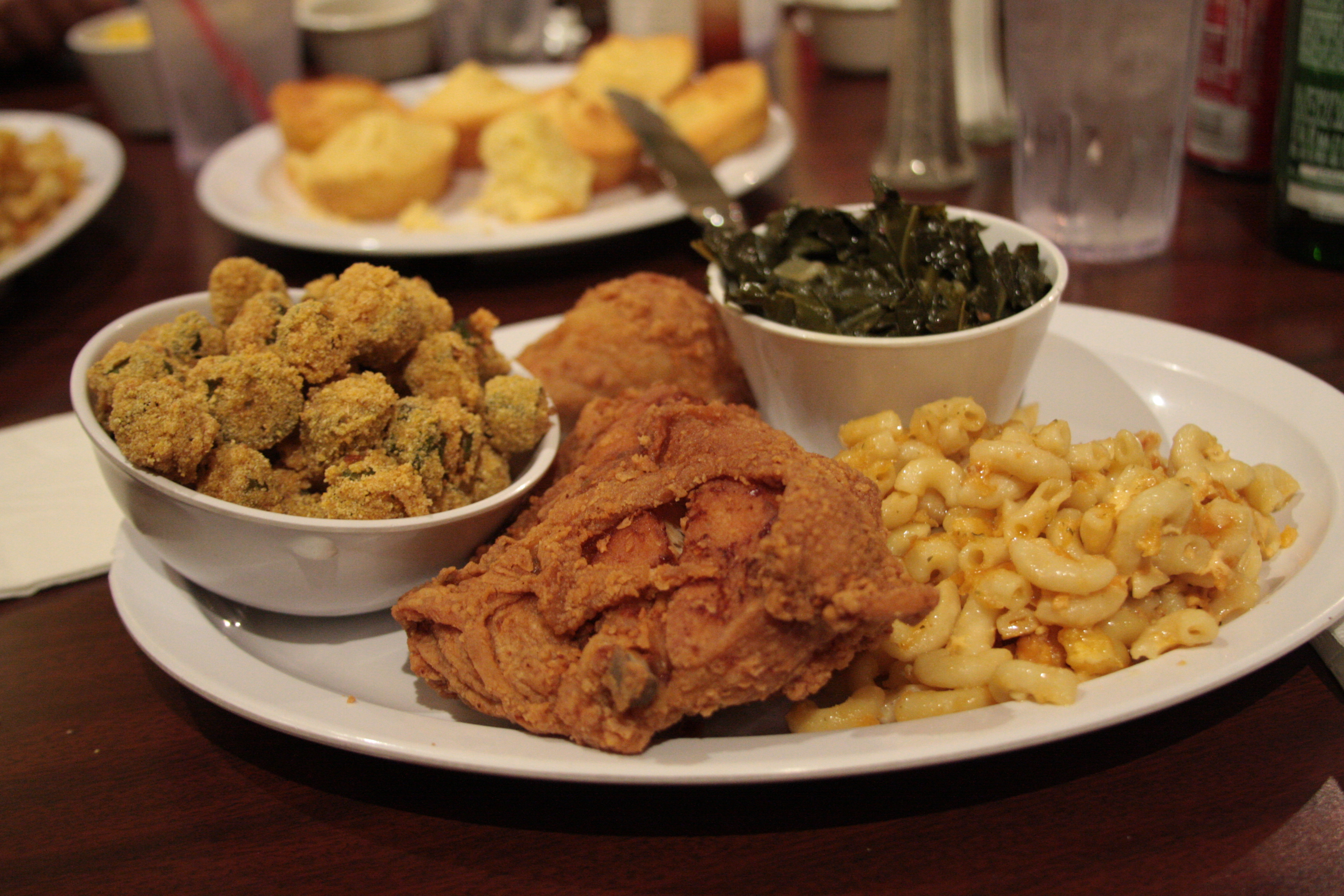
A plate of soul food consisting of fried okra, fried chicken, macaroni and cheese, and collard greens

This is a list of soul foods and dishes. Soul food is the ethnic cuisine of African Americans that originated in the Southern United States during the era of slavery. It uses a variety of ingredients and cooking styles, some of which came from West African and Central African cuisine brought over by enslaved Africans while others originated in Europe. Some are indigenous to the Americas as well, borrowed from Native American cuisine. The foods from West-Central Africa brought to North America during the slave trade were guinea pepper, gherkin, sesame seeds, kola nuts, eggplant, watermelon, rice, cantaloupe, millet, okra, black-eyed peas, yams, and legumes such as kidney beans. These crops became a staple in Southern cuisine in the United States. Soul food dishes were created by enslaved Black Americans using minimal ingredients because slaveholders fed their slaves. Historian John Blassingame's book published in 1972, The Slave Community: Plantation Life in the Antebellum South, was researched from a collection of slave narratives. According to Blassingame's research, some enslaved people received the bare minimum in food and had to supplement their diets by hunting, fishing, and foraging for food. From their limited food sources enslaved African Americans created their meals and new dishes called soul food.

Many of the meals prepared by enslaved people were later published in African-American cookbooks after the American Civil war. The dishes the enslaved and their descendants created influenced American southern cuisine. They created gumbo, an adaptation of a traditional west African stew; stewed tomatoes and okra; corn cakes, shrimp and grits; hoppin’ John, jambalaya, red rice and other rice-based dishes; collards and other greens; chow-chow and other pickled vegetables; boiled peanuts and peanut soup; and chitlins and cracklings, among other foods."

== Meat dishes ==
During slavery, pork was a main source of meat for enslaved Black Americans. Slaveholders only provided their slaves the parts of the pig they did not eat such as innards (chitlins), pigs' feet, pigs' ears, and pigs' tail. To supplement their diets, enslaved people hunted and fished for food. Some meat soul foods and dishes include:

Name	Image	Description
Buffalo ribs		A dish consisting of the breaded and deep fried ribs of the buffalo fish. Pictured is a live buffalo fish.
Catfish		Catfish are abundant in rivers and streams in the United States and enslaved people fished for this food and baked catfish by dredging them in cornmeal and was added with other vegetables to make a hearty meal. Pictured is fried catfish served with a cream sauce with cornbread and dirty rice on the side.
Chipped beef on toast		Pressed, dried, and salted beef with a bechamel sauce, served on toast. Additional toppings, gravy, or beef stock may also be added.
Chitlins		Chitlins are cleaned pig intestines; they are cooked in a pot and seasoned. The Hausa people in West Africa eat chicken intestines. Enslaved Africans in the American South continued their traditions of cooking, seasoning, and eating animal innards. Enslaved people added extremely hot peppers for additional flavor and spice to their chitlins. The parts of the pig that white plantation owners did not eat they gave to the enslaved which they used to season food and prepared one-pot meals, soups, and chitlin dishes.
Crabs		After the American Civil war, African American men made up of half of watermen in the crabbing industry in the Chesapeake Bay area. They were skilled in catching fish, crabs, and oysters. African Americans living along the Atlantic coast and Gulf Coast created soul food dishes using seafood, preparing them in one-pot stews that became gumbo and other classic dishes.
Fatback		Fatty, cured, salted pork, especially the first layers of the back of the pig primarily used in slow-cooking as a seasoning. Pictured is breaded and fried fatback.
Fried chicken		A dish consisting of chicken pieces usually from broiler chickens that have been floured or battered and then pan-fried, deep fried, or pressure fried. The seasoned breading adds a crisp coating or crust to the exterior. Chicken and waffles, in particular, is a soul food dish associated with special occasions.
Fried fish		Any of several varieties of fish, including catfish, whiting, porgies, bluegill, sometimes battered in seasoned cornmeal. Adapted from method of frying chicken.
Guinea fowl		A bird indigenous to Africa and was brought to the Americas by way of the trans-Atlantic slave trade. Guinea fowl became a source of meat for enslaved and free African Americans and eventually part of the subsistence culture of the whole region. On American plantations, the enslaved consumed the eggs of the guinea fowl, as well as cooking the meat with rice like their West-Central African ancestors.
Gumbo		Louisiana gumbo has influences from West African, French, Spanish, and Native American cuisines. Gumbo in Louisiana has a roux for thickening and as a sauce. Gullah "gumbo" in the sea islands of South Carolina and Georgia is a tomato base. In the records of slave narratives, slaves made gumbo as a meal. One slave narrative had a recipe for gumbo made by a former slave. The recipe included peppers, onions, rice, chicken and shrimp meat.
Ham hocks		Typically smoked or boiled, ham hocks generally consist of much skin, tendons and ligaments, and require long cooking through stewing, smoking or braising to be made palatable. The cut of meat can be cooked with greens and other vegetables or in flavorful sauces.
Hog jowl		Cured and smoked cheeks of pork. It is not actually a form of bacon, but is associated with the cut due to the streaky nature of the meat and the similar flavor. Hog jowl is a staple of soul food, but is also used outside the United States, for example in the Italian dish guanciale.
Hog maw		The stomach lining of a pig; it is very muscular and contains no fat. As a soul food dish, hog maw has often been coupled with chitterlings, which are pig intestines. In the book Plantation Row Slave Cabin Cooking: The Roots of Soul Food hog maw is used in the Hog Maw Salad recipe.
Jambalaya		In the records of slave narratives, formerly enslaved people from Louisiana made jambalaya as a meal with rice, pork or chicken, red pepper, onion, lard, salt and pepper.
Oxtail		The tail of cattle, oxtail is a bony, gelatin-rich meat, which is usually slow-cooked as a stew or braised.
Oysters		Enslaved and free Black Americans living near the Atlantic Ocean caught oysters for food and prepared soul food meals from this food. During slavery, Thomas Downing was a free black man who lived in New York and was known as the "New York Oyster King." By 1825 he opened an oyster cellar, "Downing's Oyster House", on Broadway Street, in the city's business district. There he served raw, fried, and stewed oysters, oyster pie, fish with oyster sauce, and poached turkey stuffed with oysters.
Pickled pigs' feet		Slow cooked, sometimes pickled or often eaten with a vinegar based sauce.
Pigs' feet		Pigs' feet in soul food is a European influence as they are eaten in Europe. African Americans use pigs' feet to season their vegetables. Also during slavery, some white plantation owners gave the parts of the pig they did not eat to their slaves. The feet of pigs: the cuts are used in various dishes around the world, and their usage increased in popularity during the Great Recession.
Pork		As a meat dish, such as ham and bacon, and for the flavoring of vegetables and legumes, gravies and sauces. Slaveholders did not provide enough food to feed their slaves and only gave enslaved people a daily diet of pork, cornmeal, and molasses. From their limited food sources, slaves seasoned their vegetables and other food using pork fat (lard) and pork meat. This became a food tradition after emancipation in Black families to season vegetables and stews with pork meat.
Pork ribs		The ribcage of a domestic pig, meat and bones together, is cut into usable pieces, prepared by smoking, grilling, or baking – usually with a sauce, often barbecue – and then served. The method of barbecuing is of Native American and West African influence. The Hausa word for barbecue is babbake. West Africans brought their methods of barbecue and making barbecue sauce to North America. African Americans use Native American and West African techniques of barbecue.
Poultry		Giblets, such as chicken liver and gizzards. Pictured is a chicken gizzard dish.
Shrimp and grits		Shrimp and grits is a seafood dish that was prepared by African Americans living near water sources such as the sea islands of South Carolina and Georgia and in Louisiana. This dish has become a common Southern dish prepared and eaten in different areas in the South.
Turkey		Black Americans flavor their vegetables, collard and turnip greens using turkey necks. Turkey necks are placed in a pot of boiling water with greens and the fat from the meat adds flavor and seasoning to vegetables.

== Vegetables, legumes, seeds and fruits ==
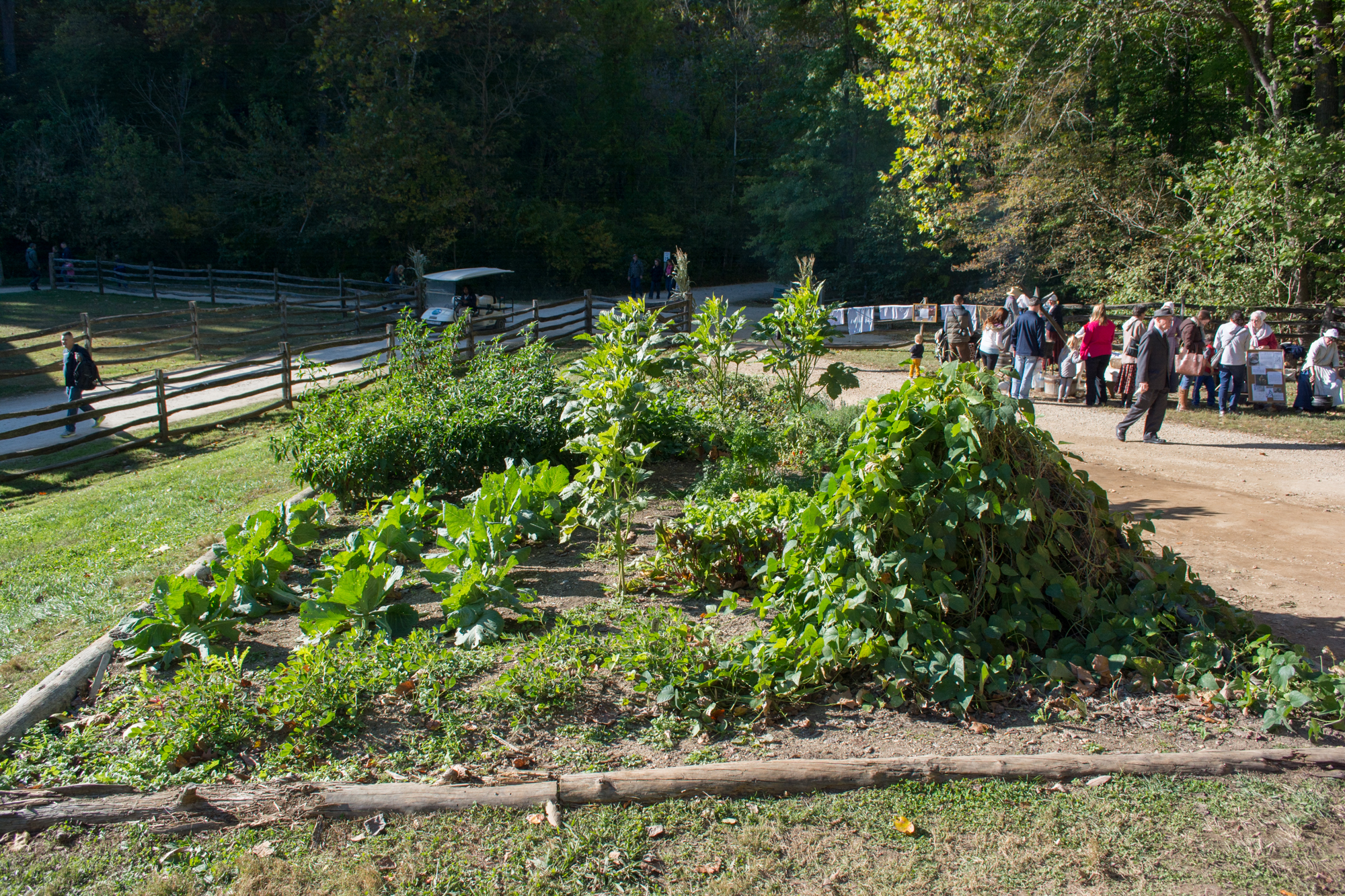
A slave food garden

Beans, greens and other vegetables are often cooked with ham or pork parts to add flavor. To supplement their diets, enslaved African Americans grew vegetables and fruits in their gardens to make one-pot stews and "gumbos." Since the late 20th-century and into the 21st-century, some African Americans create vegan soul food meals. Several Black chefs have opened vegan soul food restaurants to cook healthier foods rooted in African American culture. Researchers at the University of Guelph noted the importance of leafy greens in African-American cuisine: "Leafy greens, both indigenous to Africa and those used in African-American cuisine, are highly nutritious, rich in calcium, copper, magnesium, manganese, potassium, zinc, iron, folic acid and vitamins A, C, B1, B2, B5, B6, and E, and are useful in promoting brain function, immune system health, and hormone production."

Name	Image	Description
Apples		Apples were introduced into North America by European colonists. Enslaved people made use of apples; they were battered and deep fried in oil. Apples and other fruits were dried and saved for later until consumption.
Bell peppers		Bell peppers were grown in the gardens of enslaved people and were added to dishes to add flavor to food.
Black-eyed peas		Black-eyed peas are native to Africa. Often mixed into Hoppin' John or as a side dish. Pictured are black-eyed peas with smoked hocks and corn bread.
Cantaloupe		A variety of cantaloupe in Africa came to North America by way of the slave trade. African Americans grew cantaloupes in their gardens.
Cayenne pepper		Cayenne peppers are native to the Americas. Enslaved and free people used cayenne peppers to make a homemade barbecue sauce and was used to add heat and flavor to other dishes.
Collard greens		A staple vegetable of Southern U.S. cuisine, they are often prepared with other similar green leaf vegetables, such as kale, turnip greens, spinach, and mustard greens in "mixed greens". They are generally eaten year-round in the South, often with a pickled pepper vinegar sauce. Typical seasonings when cooking collards can consist of smoked and salted meats (ham hocks, smoked turkey drumsticks, pork neckbones, fatback or other fatty meat), diced onions and seasonings. Historians at Cornell University noted the importance of collard greens in African-American cuisine: "Collards were among several leafy green vegetables enslaved people grew in their own gardens, enabling them to carry on a West African tradition of incorporating leafy greens into soups and stews."
Corn		During slavery, corn was part of enslaved African Americans diet. Slaveholders provided cornmeal to their slaves to make meals. It was used by enslaved people to make corn bread, hominy, and boiled corn. African Americans learned from Indigenous people/Native Americans how to make ash cake, "hoe cakes", and porridge from corn. During slavery and after emancipation, African Americans used cornmeal to dredge their meats and fish and was used to bake their food.
Cornmeal		"Cornmeal was the most prevalent foods available to slaves." A former slave named Callie Elder from Georgia said her grandfather cooked catfish with lard, salt, and pepper, and rolled the catfish in cornmeal before baking. The enslaved covered their meats with cornmeal before they were fried or baked. Frederick Douglass mentioned in his autobiography the rations of food enslaved men and women received in Maryland's Eastern shore: "The men and women slaves received, as their monthly allowance of food, eight pounds of pork, or its equivalent in fish, and one bushel of corn meal".
Cucumber		Enslaved people grew cucumbers in their gardens to supplement their diets. Cucumbers are used in soul food to make a cucumber relish.
Eggplant		A species of eggplant was cultivated in Africa and brought to North America by way of the slave trade. President Thomas Jefferson grew them in his garden at Monticello. In soul food they are sliced, seasoned and placed in flour and hot oil for cooking; they are also an ingredient when making fritters.
Fish peppers		Enslaved and free African Americans in the Chesapeake Bay area and in Baltimore, Maryland grew fish peppers in their gardens to add flavor and heat to their seafood dishes. Food historian Michael Twitty suggests fish peppers were brought to the United States from Haiti.
Garlic		Garlic was grown in enslaved people's gardens to add flavor to soups, stews, and meats.
Gherkin		Gherkin is a species of cucumber native to Africa that was brought to North America by way of the slave trade. Enslaved African Americans grew them in their gardens on the plantation of President Thomas Jefferson at Monticello in Virginia. They are used in soul food cuisine to make a pickled relish.
Guinea pepper		In 1748, Peter Kalm, a Swedish-Finnish botanist, noted enslaved Africans in Philadelphia cultivated guinea peppers, a hot pepper native to West Africa. The pods of the pepper were pounded and "mixed with salt preserved in a bottle" to make sauces poured over fish and meats.
Herbs		During slavery and after emancipation, African Americans grew herbs in their gardens to add flavor to food and for herbal medicine also called folk healing. The herbs and flowers grown were basil, calendula, rosemary, thyme, parsley, sage, oregano, borage, lemon balm, hops, chamomile, and other herbs. Slaves seasoned beans with one table spoon of mixed herbs, minced garlic, salt, pepper, fried bacon, onion, and hot sauce.
Hoppin' John		A dish that originated in Gullah communities in the Low country region of South Carolina, but is now popular in many areas of the south, consisting of black-eyed peas (or field peas) and rice, with chopped onion and sliced bacon, seasoned with a bit of salt. Some people substitute ham hock, fatback, or country sausage for the conventional bacon; a few use green peppers or vinegar and spices.
Irish potato		Enslaved people in Virginia grew Irish potatoes in their gardens to make one-pot stews. In the records of slave narratives, a former slave named Millie Evans from Arkansas made an Irish potato pie.
Kola nut		The kola nut was brought from West Africa to North America by way of the slave trade. Africans used it in their Orisha religious practices. Kola nuts were used to make Coca-Cola a carbonated soft drink.
Lima beans		Lima beans are native to Central America. Portuguese explorers introduced lima beans into the African continent. Enslaved people in Virginia grew lima beans in their gardens to make one-pot stews. Today lima beans are enjoyed eaten as a dish in one-pot stews. To flavor them, bacon and chicken broth is added in a pot when cooking.
Mustard greens		A species of mustard plant. Subvarieties include southern giant curled mustard, which resembles a headless cabbage such as kale, but with a distinct horseradish-mustard flavor. It is also known as green mustard cabbage.
Okra		A vegetable that is native to West Africa and is eaten fried or stewed and is a traditional ingredient of gumbo. It is sometimes cooked with tomatoes, corn, onions and hot peppers. In West Africa and in African-American cuisine, okra is used to thicken stews and soups. In Gullah communities, cooked okra soup is prepared with "...tomatoes, and smoked meat served over rice."
Fried okra		Okra pods that have been sliced and dredged in cornmeal before frying.
Onion		Onions were grown in the gardens of enslaved people to add flavor to soup, stews, and meats. Onions were added with garlic and peppers in a skillet to add additional flavor to food.
Peach		Peaches were introduced into North America by European colonists. African American slaves stewed peaches and made peach pies and brandy. Peaches and other fruits were dried and saved for later until consumption.
Peanuts		West Africans mixed the Bambara groundnut with yams, cereal, flour, African palm oil, and melegueta pepper. Portuguese explorers introduced the American peanut from Brazil into the African continent. Africans grew peanuts in their gardens and made soups and stews with this food. Peanuts were also used as food on slave ships to feed enslaved captives. Enslaved Africans in the Southern United States prepared meals using peanuts similar to how they used the African Bambara groundnut. Slaveholders considered the peanut "slave food," and was the reason white plantation owners did not eat peanut dishes prepared by their slaves. Peanuts were grown in the gardens of enslaved people and were made into soups, stews, and peanut butter.
Persimmons		Enslaved African Americans made recipes with persimmons. Persimmons grew wild in the South and were available during autumn (fall) season, and slaves harvested them by shaking persimmon trees or gathering them off the ground. Some slaves grew persimmons. They were made into pies, drinks (beer), combined with cornmeal, and added to other foods to make a meal.
Sea Island red peas		Sea Island red peas are a variety of cowpea from West Africa brought to the sea islands of South Carolina during the slave trade. They are used in Gullah rice and bean dishes.
Sesame seeds		Sesame seeds are native to West Africa and were brought to South Carolina in 1730 by way of the slave trade. Enslaved and free Black people used sesame seeds to make sesame pudding, prepared stews, baked breads, and boiled their greens with sesame seeds. Slaves ate sesame raw, toasted, and boiled. It was used as an ingredient for baked breads in colonial America and is still used in the present day.
Squash		Squash is native to Central America and are also called sweet potato pumpkin. It was grown in the gardens of enslaved Black Americans in Virginia. President Thomas Jefferson recorded in his journal the vegetables his slaves grew. Jefferson noted: "On account of the extreme resemblance of its taste to that of the sweet potato, it may be originating form your islands…it is well esteemed at our tables, and particularly valued by our Negroes." As enslaved people moved to the Appalachian Mountains they brought the seeds of squash with them and influenced Appalachian cuisine.
Sweet potatoes		Often parboiled, sliced, then adorned with butter, sugar, cinnamon, nutmeg, vanilla or other spices, and baked; commonly called "candied sweets" or "candied yams"
Tomato		Tomatoes are native to the Americas. Free and enslaved African Americans grew tomatoes in their gardens to make one-pot stews and gumbo. Former slave Clara Davis from Alabama cooked catfish using tomatoes and potatoes or prepared baked catfish with a tomato gravy and sweet potatoes.
Turnip greens		Turnip leaves are sometimes eaten as "turnip greens", and they resemble mustard greens in flavor. Turnip greens are a common side dish in southeastern US cooking, primarily during late fall and winter. Smaller leaves are preferred; however, any bitter taste of larger leaves can be reduced by pouring off the water from initial boiling and replacing it with fresh water. Varieties specifically grown for the leaves resemble mustard greens more than those grown for the roots, with small or no storage roots.
Watermelon		Watermelon came from Africa to North America by way of the slave trade. Enslaved African Americans grew them in their gardens for food. Due to their red color, they are eaten during Juneteenth celebrations. The color red represents resilience and joy.

== Breads and grains ==
Rice was a cash crop in the South Carolina Lowcountry, and during the slave trade, Europeans selected coastal inhabitants of West Africa who had knowledge of rice cultivation. Other grains such as millet and sorghum were cultivated in Africa and were used in West-Central African cooking to make stews.

Name	Image	Description
Charleston red rice		Charleston red rice is made with rice and tomato paste. The dish was created in the Gullah Geechee community. Charleston red rice originated from jollof rice in West Africa, which is made with a tomato product giving the rice its red color.
Cornbread		A quickbread often baked or made in a skillet, commonly made with buttermilk and seasoned with bacon fat; inspired by the great availability of corn in America. Cornbread is of Native American origin. Traditional southern cornbread is baked in European cake and bread baking style. Pictured is skillet cornbread.
Dirty rice		Dirty rice is a dish from Louisiana. The name is from rice cooked with poultry, beef or pork and with green bell pepper, celery, and onions.
Grits		A cooked coarsely ground cornmeal of Native American origin.
Hoecake		Also known as Johnnycake, a type of cornbread that is thin in texture, and fried in cooking oil in a skillet, whose name is derived from field hands' often cooking it on a shovel or hoe held to an open flame.
Hushpuppies		Balls of deep-fried cornmeal, usually with salt and diced onions. Typical hushpuppy ingredients include cornmeal, wheat flour, eggs, salt, baking soda, milk or buttermilk, and water, and may include onion, spring onion (scallion), garlic, whole kernel corn, and peppers.
Millet		Millet is a grain grown in West Africa and was brought to North America by way of the slave trade. Millet is used in soul food to thicken soups and stews. Igbo people in West Africa cooked millet in a pot with vegetables, meats, poultry, and fish. In Central Africa, Congolese people cooked millet with palm oil. This method of cooking grains with meats in one-pot stews from West-Central Africa continued in the Southern United States in the slave community and after Emancipation in African-American communities. They combined North American ingredients and African crops and created dishes that became gumbo and other classic southern foods.
Rice		A species of rice was domesticated in Africa, so many people brought to the Americas during the slave trade preserved rice cooking techniques from West Africa. Rice is a staple side dish in the lowcountry region and in Louisiana. It is a main ingredient in dishes such as jambalaya and red beans and rice popular in Southern Louisiana.
Red beans and rice		Red beans and rice is a dish from Louisiana. It is made with kidney beans, bell pepper, onion, and celery and with spices and meats such as ham and sausage.
Sorghum		A species of sorghum was cultivated in Africa and was brought to North America by way of the slave trade. Enslaved and free African Americans used sorghum to make sorghum molasses.

== Desserts ==
Name	Image	Description
Sweet potato pie		Parboiled sweet potatoes, then pureed, spiced, and baked in a pie crust, similar in texture to pumpkin pie. A traditional dessert in African American families during Thanksgiving and Christmas holidays is making and eating sweet potato pie. In the records of slave narratives, enslaved people made sweet potato pie.
Banana pudding		Pudding made with vanilla custard, vanilla wafers, bananas, whipped cream and vanilla extract
Red velvet cake		Red colored cake made with cocoa powder. Red food and drinks are traditional during Juneteenth celebrations, including red velvet cake. The color red represents resilience and joy.
Pecan pie		Pie made with pecans

== Regional soul food ==
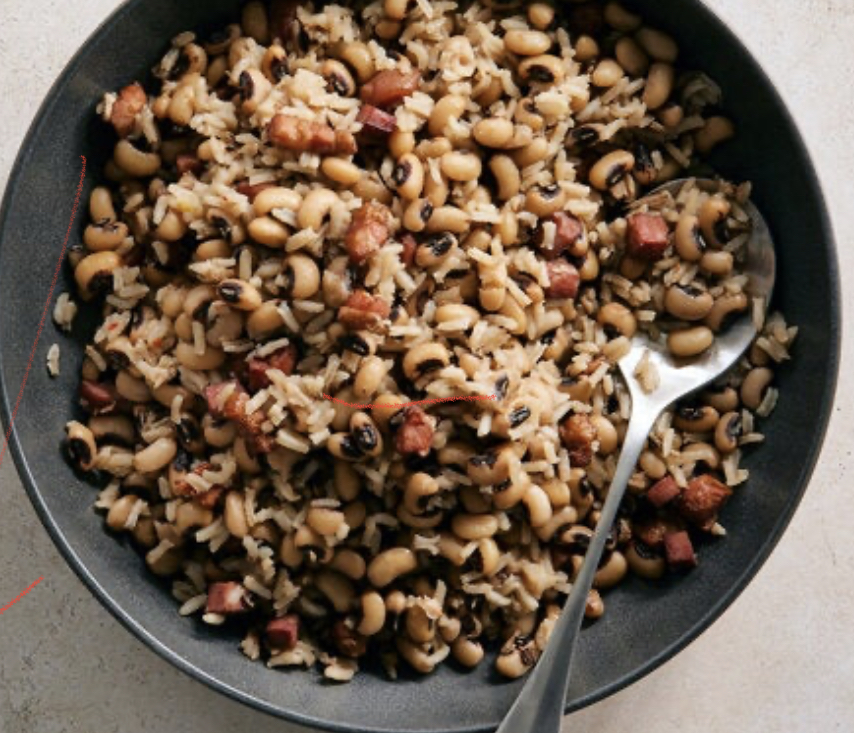
Authentic Gullah Hoppin' John - Hoppin' John is a traditional New Year's dish that originated among Gullah people in the lowcountry.

These are more specific regional soul food dishes. This includes dishes like jambalaya, gumbo, red rice and beans and other foods of the Creole subgroup of the Black American ethnic group. It also includes the dishes of the Gullah Geeche sub group of the Black American peoples.

Chicken and waffles became a common soul food item in Black communities in Maryland and in Harlem, New York. During the blues and jazz era, musicians and singers ate at soul food restaurants located inside black-owned night clubs and cooks prepared chicken and waffles for their customers.

== See also ==
- List of American foods
- List of foods of the Southern United States
- Louisiana Creole cuisine
- List of American desserts

== Bibliography ==
- Ferguson, Sheila (1993). Soul Food: Classic Cuisine from the Deep South. Grove Press. ISBN 0802132839
