= Guinea pepper =

Guinea pepper is a name for several unrelated pepper-like spices traded from the general region of West Africa:

- Grains of paradise (Aframomum melegueta), from the ginger family (Zingiberaceae), also known as grains of paradise, melegueta pepper, alligator pepper, Guinea grains, ossame, ‘‘ataré’’in Yoruba land, fom wisa, and (ambiguously) Guinea pepper
- Grains of Selim, also known as Kani pepper, Senegal pepper, Ethiopian pepper, Moor pepper, Negro pepper, poivre de Sénégal, djar, hwentia, hwentea, so, chimba, kimba, kili, and (ambiguously) Guinea pepper
  - Xylopia aethiopica from the custard apple family (Annonaceae), primary source of the spice most commonly known in the West as grains of Selim
  - Xylopia striata, a closely related source of grains of Selim, with larger seed pods
- Piper guineense from the pepper family (Piperaceae), also known as West African pepper, Ashanti pepper, Benin pepper, false cubeb, Guinea cubeb, kale, kukauabe, masoro, sasema, soro wisa, and uziza
