= Gaditanoir =

Literary festival held in Spain

- Industry: Literature noir
- Founded: 2024
- Founder: Javier Fornell, Daniel Lanza Barba and Alberto Puyana
- Headquarters: Cádiz, Spain, Spain
- Website: www.gaditanoir.com

Gaditanoir is a noir fiction festival held in Cádiz during the month of November.

== History ==
On November 7, 2024, a new noir fiction series was born under the name Gaditanoir, an initiative launched by Kaizen Editores in collaboration with the Cádiz City Council. The festival is held annually every November, with a clear Ibero-American focus.

Its first curator is Cádiz-born author Alberto Puyana, and its headquarters is the Casa de Iberoamérica, formerly the Royal Prison of Cádiz.

Gaditanoir was inaugurated by Juan Gómez-Jurado, who gave the first presentation of his novel Todo muere.

== Editions ==
Gaditanoir began in 2024, led by writers Alberto Puyana, Daniel Lanza Barba, and Javier Fornell, the latter two being editors at Kaizen Editores, the festival's organizing entity. The event was held with the support of the Cádiz City Council, Cádiz Ciudad de Libros, the Cádiz Provincial Council, and the UNED, which contributed to the academic programming, thereby combining both the cultural and educational aspects of the event.

=== Gaditanoir 2025 ===
The 2025 edition of Gaditanoir will take place from November 5 to 8 at the Casa de Iberoamérica in Cádiz, as announced by the organizers during the 2025 Cádiz Book Fair.

==== Participants ====
- María Oruña
- Carlos Salem
- Oscar Lobato
- Rafael Marín
- Alberto Puyana
- Daniel Lanza Barba
- Marta Huelves
- Alberto Caliani
- Lola Montalvo
- Javier Fornell
- Montiel de Arnaiz
- Eduardo Formanti
- David Monthiel
- Cristina Braza
- Daniel Heredia
- Jesús Cañada
- Eba Martín Muñoz
- Blanca Cabañas
- Antonio Muñoz de la Vega
- Eduardo Fernán-López
- Luis Rodríguez Guerrero
- Aida R. Agraso
- Antonio Sanz Fuentes
- Hugo de Andrés Castro
- Óscar Lobato
- Alicia Domínguez
- Juan González Mesa
- Mauro Barea
- Gregori Dolz

=== Gaditanoir 2024 ===
The inaugural edition of Gaditanoir was held from November 7 to 10, 2024, at the Casa de Iberoamérica in Cádiz.

==== Participants ====
- Juan Gómez-Jurado
- Susana Martín Gijón
- Alberto Caliani
- Jesús Relinque
- Luis Rodríguez Guerrero
- Rafa Marín
- Óscar Lobato
- Rosario Tey
- Benito Olmo
- Daniel Fopiani
- Antonio Puentes Mayor
- Blanca Cabañas
- Alberto Puyana
- Juan Manuel Sainz Peña
- Lola Montalvo
- Cristina Braza
- Marta Huelves
- Jesús Tíscar
- Willy del Pozo (Peru)
- David Monthiel
- Mauro Barea (México)

=== Awards ===
Gaditanoir presents two annual awards:

- The José Rasero Balón Award for the best noir novel of the year, named after the Cádiz-born author.
- The Riverside Short Story Award, worth €150, which has been organized by Kaizen Editores since 2020.
- In 2025, an honorary lifetime achievement award connected to literature was created.

=== Award Winners ===
Honorary Lifetime Achievement Award
| Year | Author |
|---|---|
| 2025 | Juan Bolea |

José Rasero Balón Gaditanoir Award

| Year | Title | Author | Publisher | Publication year |
|---|---|---|---|---|
| 2024 | Los perros que nadie quiere | Juan González Mesa | Editorial Edaf | 2023 |
| 2025 | Siempre vienen de noche | Alberto Calinai | Ediciones B | 2024 |

The Riverside Short Story Award

| Year | Edition | Story Title | Author |
|---|---|---|---|
| 2024 | IV The Riverside | La Bella escondida | Sebastián García Sancho |
| 2025 | V The Riverside | La llamada de los salvaje | Alexis Vidal López |
