= African pepper =

African pepper is a name for several unrelated pepper-like spices traded from the general region of West Africa:

- Grains of paradise (Aframomum melegueta) from the ginger family (Zingiberaceae), also known as melegueta pepper, alligator pepper, Guinea grains, ossame, fom wisa, and (ambiguously) Guinea pepper
- Grains of Selim, seeds of the plant Xylopia aethiopica from the custard apple family (Annonaceae), used primary as a spice, also known as Kani pepper, Senegal pepper, Ethiopian pepper, Moor pepper, Negro pepper, poivre de Sénégal, djar, hwentia, hwentea, so, chimba, kimba, kili, and (ambiguously) Guinea pepper
- Xylopia quintasii, a closely related source of grains of Selim, with larger seed pods
- Piper guineense from the pepper family (Piperaceae), also known as West African pepper, Ashanti pepper, Benin pepper, false cubeb, Guinea cubeb, kale, kukauabe, masoro, sasema, soro wisa, and uziza
