= Salimi =

Salimi may refer to:

== People ==
- Abbas Salimi Azmi, 21st century Malaysian politician
- Abdulaziz Al Salimi (born 1991), Kuwaiti footballer
- Adel Al-Salimi (born 1979), Yemeni footballer
- Ali Salimi (1922–1997), Iranian musician
- Alireza Salimi (footballer) (born 1984), Iranian footballer
- Alireza Salimi (politician) (born c. 1964), Iranian Shi'a cleric and politician
- Arian Salimi (born 2003), Iranian taekwondo athlete
- Behdad Salimi (born 1989), Iranian weightlifter
- Fakhra Salimi (born 1957), Pakistani-born Norwegian human rights activist
- Homayoun Salimi (born 1948), Iranian painter
- Iman Salimi (born 1996), Iranian footballer
- Khalid Salimi (born 1954), peace and human rights activist, art critic, and music columnist
- Manutchehr Salimi (1943–1981), Iranian politician from north of Iran, Amarlu District
- Maryam Salimi (born 1978), Iranian writer and visual communications expert
- Mohammad Salimi (1937–2016), Iranian military commander
- Mohammad Salimi (TV presenter) (born 1984), Iranian TV host
- Mostafa Salimi (1904–1994), Iranian football player and manager
- Mostafa Salimi (mayor) (born 1966 or 1967), Iranian public servant
- Nur al-Din al-Salimi (1869–1914), Omani historian and scholar
- Sepehr Salimi (born 1981), Iranian blogger, journalist and environmentalist
- Youssef Salimi (born 1972), Algerian footballer

== Other ==
- Salimi, Isfahan, a village in Iran
- a follower of the Sālimiyya Sufi movement

== See also ==
- Salim (disambiguation)
