= Š-L-M =

Semitic triconsonantal root

Š-L-M is a triconsonantal root of many Semitic words (many of which are used as names). The root meaning translates to "whole, safe, intact, unharmed, to go free, without blemish". Its earliest known form is in the name of Shalim, the ancient god of dusk of Ugarit. Derived from this are meanings of "to be safe, secure, at peace", hence "well-being, health" and passively "to be secured, pacified, submitted".

- Central Semitic Š-L-M
  - Arabic: س-ل-م, S-L-M
    - Maltese: S-L-M
  - Imperial Aramaic: ܫ-ܠ-ܡ, Š-L-M
  - Canaanite: Š-L-M (cf. Shalem)
    - Hebrew: ש־ל־ם, Š-L-M (Paleo-Hebrew 𐤔-𐤋-𐤌; Samaritan Hebrew ࠔ-ࠋ-ࠌ)
- East Semitic S-L-M
- South Semitic "S-L-M"
  - Ge'ez: ሰ-ላ-ም, S-L-M

Arabic salām (سَلاَم), Maltese sliem, Hebrew šālōm (שָׁלוֹם), Ge'ez sälam (ሰላም), Syriac šlama (pronounced Shlama, or Shlomo in the Western Syriac dialect) (ܫܠܡܐ), Mandaic šlama (ࡔࡋࡀࡌࡀ) are cognate Semitic terms for 'peace', deriving from a Proto-Semitic *šalām-.

Given names related to the same root include Solomon (Süleyman), Absalom, Selim, Salem, Salim, Salma, Salmah, Salman, Selimah, Shelimah, Salome, Szlama (Polish) etc.

Arabic (and by extension Maltese), Hebrew, Ge'ez, and Aramaic have cognate expressions meaning 'peace be upon you' used as a greeting:

- Arabic: As-salāmu ʻalaykum (السلام عليكم) is used to greet others and is an Arabic equivalent of 'hello'. The appropriate response to such a greeting is "and upon you be peace" (wa-ʻalaykum as-salām).
  - Maltese: Sliem għalikom.
- Hebrew: Shālôm ʻalêḵem (שלום עליכם) is the equivalent of the Arabic expression, the response being עליכם שלום ʻAlêḵem shālôm, 'upon you be peace'.
- Ge'ez: Selami ālikayimi (ሰላም አልካይም)
- Neo-Aramaic: šlámaloxun, Šlama 'lokh (ܫܠܡܐ ܥܠܘܟ), classically, Šlām lakh ܫܠܡ ܠܟ.

== East Semitic ==
In the Amarna letters, a few of the 382 letters discuss the exchange of "peace gifts", greeting-gifts (Shulmani) between the Pharaoh and the other ruler involving the letter. Examples are Zita (Hittite prince), and Tushratta of Mitanni. Also, Kadashman-Enlil of Babylon, (Karduniaš of the letters).

Šalām (shalamu) is also used in letter introductions to express the authors' health. An example letter EA19, from Tushratta to Pharaoh, states:

"...the king of Mittani, your brother. For me all goes well. For you may all go well." (lines 2-4)

In Akkadian:

- Salimatu "alliance"
- Salimu "peace, concord"
- Shalamu "to be(come) whole, safe; to recover; to succeed, prosper"
- Shulmu "health, well-being"; also a common greeting

== Northwest Semitic ==
"Shalom"

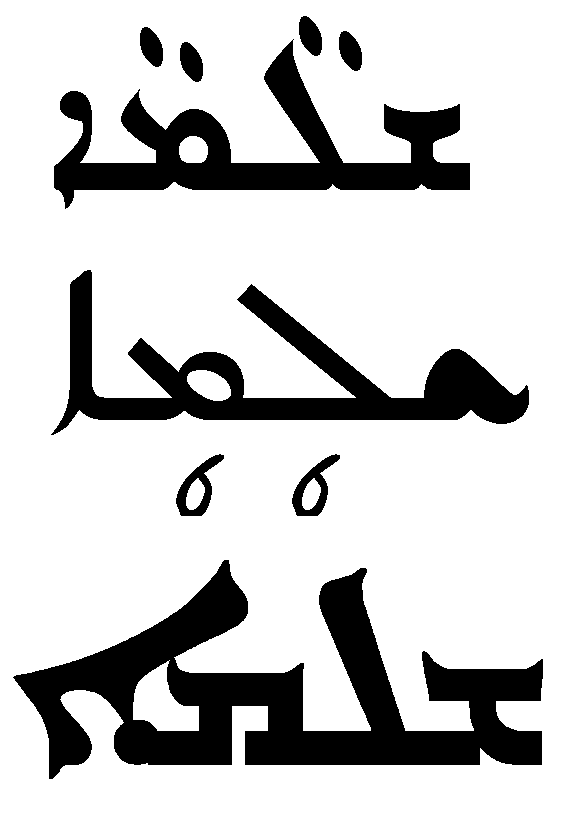
"Shlama/Shlomo in (top) Madnkhaya, (middle) Serto, and (bottom) Estrangela script"

The Koine Greek New Testament text uses eirēnē (εἰρήνη) for 'peace', which perhaps represents Jesus saying 'šlama'; this Greek form became the northern feminine name Irene. In the Epistles, it often occurs alongside the usual Greek greeting chairein (χαίρειν) in the phrase 'grace and peace'. However, comparison of the Greek Septuagint and Hebrew Masoretic Old Testament texts shows some instances where shalom was translated instead as soteria (σωτηρία, meaning 'salvation').

In Hebrew:

- Shalom
- Mushlam (מושלם) – perfect
- Shalem (שלם) – whole, complete
- Lehashlim (להשלים) – to complete, fill in; to reconcile
- Leshallem (לשלם) – to pay
- Tashlum (תשלום) – payment
- Shillumim (שילומים) – reparations
- Lehishtallem (להשתלם) – to be worth it, to "pay"
- Absalom (אבשלום) – a personal name, literally means 'Father [of] Peace'.

In Aramaic:

- Shlama – 'peace'
- Shalmuta

=== Given names ===
- Shlomi (שלומי or שלמי)
- Solomon, Shlomo (שלמה)
- Shlomit (שלומית)
- Shulamit (שולמית)

== Arabic ==
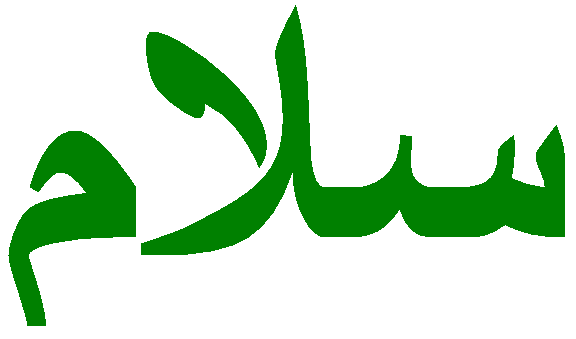
"Salām"

The Arabic word salām is used in a variety of expressions and contexts in Arabic and Islamic speech and writing. "Al-Salām" is one of the 99 names of God in Islam, and also a male given name in conjunction with ʻabd. ʻAbd al-Salām translates to 'Servant of [the embodiment of] Peace', i.e. of Allah.

- سلام salām 'Peace'
- السلام عليكم as-salāmu ʿalaykum 'Peace be upon you'
- إسلام ʾislām 'Submission'
- مسلم muslim 'One who submits'
- تسليم taslīm – 'Delivering peace – giving a salutation or a submission'
- استسلام istislām – 'The act of submitting (oneself), surrenderring'
- مستسلم mustaslim – 'One who submits (oneself), surrenders'
- سالم sālim – 'subject of SLM – its SLM, 'the vase is SLM', 'the vase is whole, unbroken'
- مُسَلَّم musallam – 'undisputed'
- Catholic Church: in the rosary: السلام عليك يا مريم as-salām ʻalayki yā Maryam 'Hail Mary'.

In Maltese:

- Sliem – 'peace'
- Sielem - 'peaceful'
- Sellem – 'to greet, to salute'
- Tislima - 'a greeting, a salutation'
- Sliema - 'a town in Malta'

=== Arabic Islām ===
The word إسلام ʾislām is a verbal noun derived from s-l-m, meaning "submission" (i.e. entrusting one's wholeness to a higher force), which may be interpreted as humility. "One who submits" is signified by the participle مسلم, Muslim (fem. مسلمة, muslimah).

The word is given a number of meanings in the Qur'an. In some verses (āyāt), the quality of Islam as an internal conviction is stressed: "Whomsoever God desires to guide, He expands his breast to Islam." Other verses connect islām and dīn (usually translated as "religion"): "Today, I have perfected your religion (dīn) for you; I have completed My blessing upon you; I have approved Islam for your religion." Still others describe Islam as an action of returning to God—more than just a verbal affirmation of faith.

=== Given names ===
- Salam (سلام Salām)
- Salman (سلمان Salmān)
- Salim (سالم Sālim)
- Suleim (سُليم Sulaym)
- Suleiman (سليمان Sulaymān)

== See also ==
- Names of Jerusalem
