= Grains of Selim =

Spice similar to black pepper

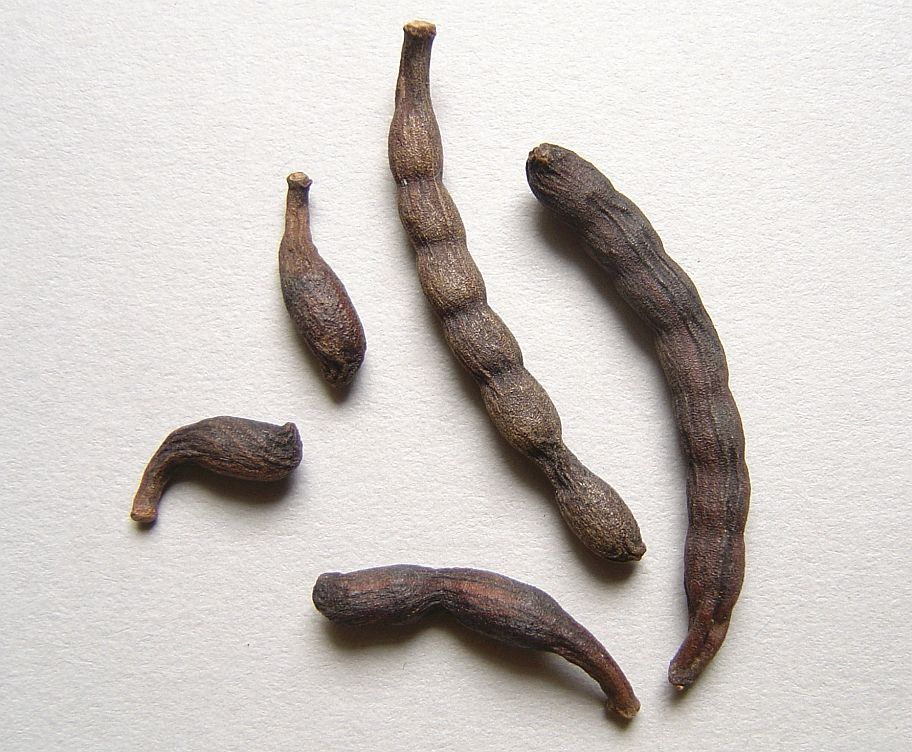
Grains of Selim seed pods

Grains of Selim are the seeds of a shrubby tree, Xylopia aethiopica, found in Africa. The seeds have a musky flavor and are used as a spice in a manner similar to black pepper, and as a flavouring agent that defines café Touba, the dominant style of coffee in Senegal. It is also known as Senegal pepper, Ethiopian pepper, and (historically) Moor pepper and Negro pepper. It also has many names in native languages of Africa, the most common of which is diarr in the Wolof language (this is the name used on most packages of café Touba). It is called 'Etso' in the Ewe language of Ghana and Togo. It is sometimes referred to as African pepper or Guinea pepper, but these are ambiguous terms that may refer to Ashanti pepper and grains of paradise, among others.

== Description ==
As a spice, the whole fruit (pod) is used, as the hull of the fruit lends an aromatic note (with the taste being described as an admixture of cubeb pepper and nutmeg with overtones of resin) whilst the seeds lend pungency (they are also quite bitter). Typically the dried fruit is lightly crushed before being tied in a bouquet garni and added to West African soups (stews). In Senegal, the spice is often sold smoked in markets as poivre de Sénégal (French for 'Senegal pepper'); the whole green fruit is smoked, giving the spice a sticky consistency, and when pounded in a pestle and mortar it makes a spice paste. These, however, tend to be the larger pods of the related species Xylopia striata.

== Use in regional cuisines ==
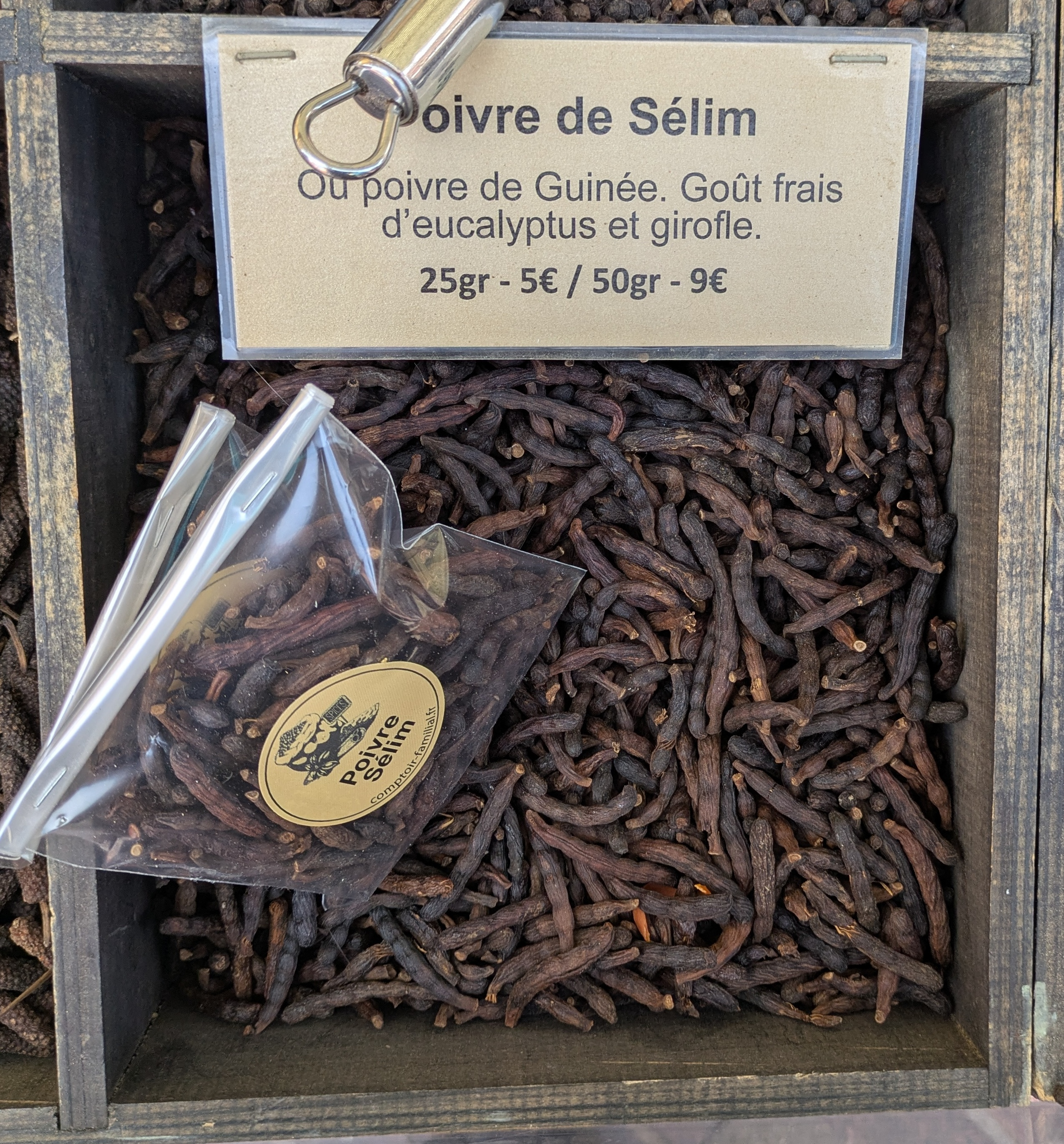
Sold at a street market in Nice, France

The pods are crushed and added whole to soups or stews, then removed before serving the food. Paste from smoked and ground pods can be used as a spice rub for fish.

In African cookbooks, especially those from Cameroon, the spice is referred to by the name kieng - a word of unknown etymology. In northern Cameroon as well as Northern Nigeria, it is one of three spices added to tea, along with dried ginger and cloves.

The Akan of Ghana call it hwentia or hwentea, the Ewes of Ghana call it Etso, while the Ga of Ghana call it so. The Ga use it in preparing shito, a black, spicy pepper sauce. It is also used in soups and beverages, for example shitodaa, a beverage of the Ga. The Ewes use it in soups, porridges and beverages including bisap. Dagombas in northern Ghana call it chimba, and it is mainly used in spicing coco (millet, sorghum, or maize porridge). It is also sometimes used in soups and stews. Other regional names include kimba and kili.

In Senegal, the grains are a key ingredient in Touba-style coffee (called café Touba in French). Near the end of the roasting phase of making the coffee, grains of Selim, known in Wolof as djar, are added while the heat is still on. Roasting continues for approximately five more minutes; during this time the sneeze-producing scent of pepper becomes easily discernible.

== See also ==
- List of culinary herbs and spices
