= Salem (name) =

- Pronunciation: Arabic: [ˈsæːlem, ˈsæːlɪm, ˈsaːlɪm], English origin: /ˈseɪləm/ Hebrew: [ʃaˈlem]
- Gender: Male

Origin
- Origin: Arabic, Hebrew
- Meaning: Peaceful, complete

Salem (Arabic: سالم, alternatively transliterated as Sālim) is a given name of Arabic origin. The Arabic name Salim (in Arabic سليم) is also sometimes rendered as Salem in English, though pronounced with a short a and long ee. In Arabic, the two are distinctly different names, although their meanings are etymologically related.

It can also be a transliteration of the Hebrew: שָׁלֵם Shalem; the Jewish and Arabic name is also transliterated as Salem. It is an Arabic- and Sephardic Jewish-origin given name and surname, and an English surname of Anglo-Saxon origin.

== Given name ==
- Salem Abdulaziz Al Sabah (born 1951), Kuwaiti royal and politician
- Salem Al Fakir (born 1981), Swedish musician of Syrian origin. Also part of Vargas & Lagola as Lagola
- Salem Al-Ali Al-Sabah (1926–2024), Kuwaiti royal, commander of the Kuwait National Guard (1967–2024).
- Salem al-Hazmi (1981–2001), Saudi hijacker of American Airlines Flight 77 in the September 11 attacks
- Salem bin Laden (1946–1988), Saudi investor
- Salem Chaker (born 1950), Algerian Berberologist
- Salem Chalabi (born 1963), Iraqi-American lawyer
- Salem Choheili (born 1935), Iranian scribe and author
- Salem Ilese (born 1999), American singer-songwriter
- Salem M'Bakata (born 1998), Congolese professional footballer
- Salem Masadeh (1929/30-2024), Jordanian politician
- Salem Mitchell (born 1998), American model known for her numerous facial freckles
- Salem Nasser Bakheet (born 1977), Bahraini athlete
- Salem Poor (1747–1802), African-American soldier
- Salem Saad (1978–2009), Emirati footballer
- Salem Saleh (born 1993), Emirati chess grandmaster

=== Middle name ===
- Ali Salem Tamek (born 1973), Sahrawi independence activist

== Surname ==
- Abu Salem (born 1969), Indian mobster
- Ali Salem (1936–2015), Egyptian playwright
- Amr Salem (born 1958), Syrian politician
- Carlos Salem (born 1959), Argentine writer
- El Hedi ben Salem (1935–1977), Moroccan actor
- Elie Salem (born 1930), Lebanese academic and politician
- Emad Salem (born 1950), Egyptian FBI informant
- Gamal Salem (1918–1968), Egyptian military officer and politician
- Kario Salem (born 1955), American television, film, stage actor and screenwriter
- Lee Salem, (1946–2019) US comic strip editor
- Lee Salem, US poker player
- Lyes Salem (born 1966), Algerian actor and film director
- Mahdi Salem (born 2004), Qatari professional footballer
- Mahmoud Salem (1931–2013), Egyptian journalist and author
- Mamdouh Salem (1918–1988), Egyptian politician
- Mostafa Salem, Libyan administrator
- Nadia Salem (born 1946), Egyptian filmmaker
- Omran Salem (born 1997), Libyan professional footballer
- Pamela Salem (1944–2024), British film and television actress
- Peter Salem (1750–1816), African-American soldier
- Raphaël Salem (1898–1963), Greek mathematician
- Salah Salem (1920–1962), Egyptian military officer and politician

== Fictional characters ==
- Salem Saberhagen, fictional cat
- Salem, the main antagonist of the animated web series RWBY
- Salem, Tyler The Creator's fictional love interest in his 2013 album Wolf

== See also ==
- Salem (disambiguation)
- Salim (disambiguation), similar name that can become indistinguishable in transliteration
