= Café Touba =

Coffee drink flavored with grains of Selim

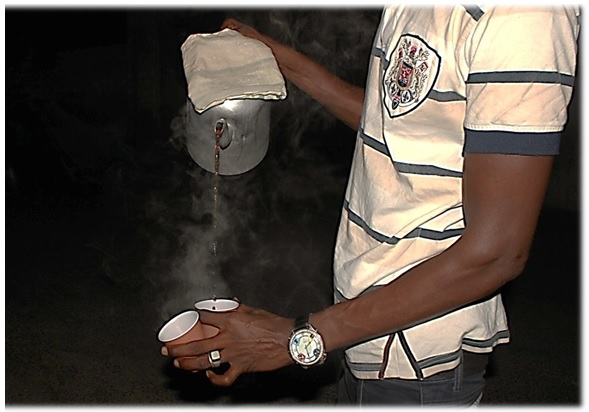
Pouring Café Touba

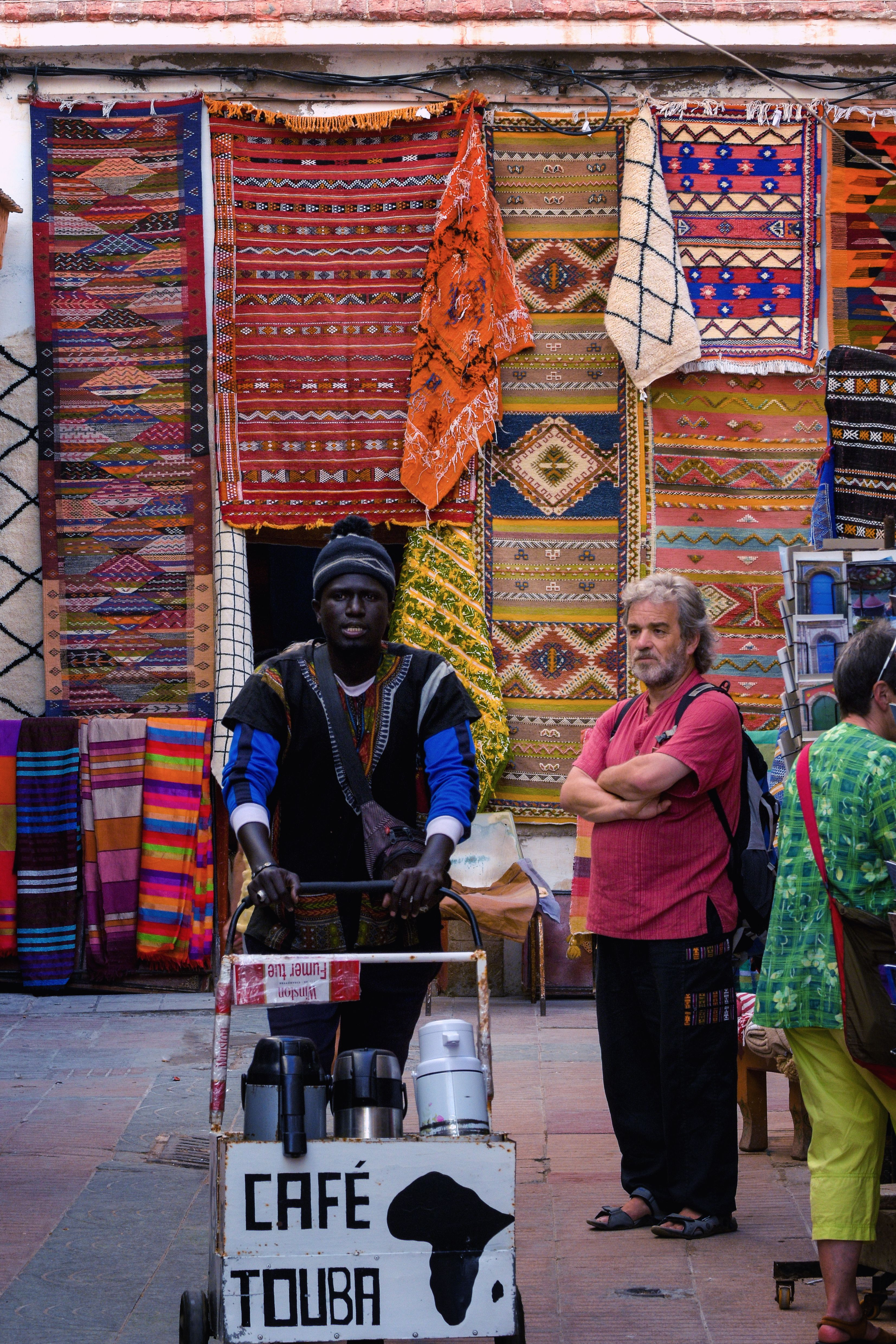
Café Touba vendor in Morocco

Café Touba is a coffee beverage that is a popular traditional drink from Senegal that is (more recently) also consumed in Guinea-Bissau, and is named for the city of Touba, Senegal.

Café Touba is a coffee drink that is flavored with grains of Selim or Guinea pepper (the dried fruit of the shrub Xylopia aethiopica) (locally known as djar, in the Wolof language) and sometimes cloves. The addition of djar, that is cultivated in Touba, is the important factor differentiating café Touba from plain coffee. The spices are mixed and roasted with coffee beans, then ground into a powder. The drink is prepared using a filter, in a manner similar to that used to prepare drip coffee.

== History ==
Café Touba (French for 'Touba coffee') is named for the city of Touba, Senegal (Hassaniya Arabic Ṭūbā, 'Felicity'). The drink is traditionally consumed by the Islamic Mouride brotherhood as it came to Senegal when the brotherhood's founder, Sheikh Amadou Bamba Mbacké, returned from exile in Gabon in 1902. The drink is served during ceremonies, commemorations, and during the Grand Magal of Touba.

== Usage ==
The coffee-to-djar ratio is typically around 80 percent coffee to 20 percent djar. In recent years, consumption of café Touba has been increasing as the drink is spreading to cities of all faiths, both in and outside Senegal. The World Bank wrote that a progressive elimination of imported coffee seems common in poorer areas of Senegal as a result of the global recession of 2009: a Senegalese restaurant owner stated, "We weren't used to consume [sic] the Tuba Coffee for breakfast, but since the crisis people drink it a lot, also children." Commercial export outside Senegal, while small, is present. In Guinea-Bissau, café Touba has become the country's most popular drink, even though it was relatively unknown several years ago. Consumption of café Touba increased to the point that sales of instant coffee, most notably Nescafé, decreased in West Africa. To more directly compete with café Touba, Nestlé launched a product that contains spices, called Nescafé Ginger & Spice.
