= Alberto Puyana =

Spanish writer

- Born: Jose Alberto Puyana; February 25, 1974 (age 52); Cádiz, Spain
- Occupation: Writer
- Years active: 2012 -
- Notable work: Matacrías

Alberto Puyana (Cádiz, 25 February 1974) is a Spanish writer, recipient of numerous national and international awards, and author of novels. He is the curator of the "Gaditanoir" Crime Novel Literary Festival held in Cádiz.

== Biography ==
He spent his childhood and adolescence in the Santa María neighborhood of Cádiz, where he was a neighbor of the well-known author and comparsista Antonio Martínez Ares. Educated in La Salle schools, he studied Nursing at the University of Cádiz (UCA), graduating in 1995. His professional career led him to work in public hospitals in Puerto Real, Cádiz, Jerez, Algeciras, and La Línea.

From 2015 to 2018, he was an opinion columnist for the newspaper La Voz del Sur. A nurse by profession, until 2024 he served as the healthcare representative for the CSIF trade union in the province of Cádiz.

== Works ==
Puyana has published five novels, one poetry collection, and various short stories included in anthologies.

=== Novels ===
- El Practicante (Bubok, 2012), a satirical novel that was a finalist for the IV Bubok Literary Creation Prize.
- Lo que no te conté (Tandaia, 2017), a thriller that was a semifinalist for the Ateneo Ciudad de Valladolid Novel Prize (2013).
- La horma del zapato ajeno (Alma Negra, 2019), finalist in a contest organized by the Madrid-based publisher.
- Corpore Insepulto (Kaizen Editores, 2022).
- Matacrías (Kaizen Editores, 2025)

=== Anthologies ===
- El mundo de la fantasía (El Sastre de los Libros, 2014)
- Relatos na rúa (Elvira, 2014)
- Pax Tibi / Nieve sobre el cerezo (Evohé, 2015)
- El bosque del inglés (Evohé, 2016)
- La Máscara de Thebe / El precio que pagan los conejos al rugir (Evohé, 2017)
- Ser el mejor de los hombres / Flores que el río arrastra lejos (Evohé, 2019)
- Amigo mío / Las justas florales (Evohé, 2020)
- Niebla en la orilla (Kaizen Editores, 2021)
- La mala tierra / El tiempo en el que fermenta la levadura (Evohé, 2023)

== Awards and recognition ==
Since he began participating in literary competitions in late 2011, Puyana has won 43 national and international prizes. Notable distinctions include the Hispano-Luso José Antonio de Saravia Prize (2018), the Nómadas RNE Award for Best Travel Diary (2016), the “Hospital San Rafael” Prize from the University of Nebrija (2016), the “Puente Zuazo” Prize (2015), the “Marbella Activa” Prize (2015 and 2021 — being the only author to win it twice), the “Leopoldo de Luis” Prize (2014), and the Mystic Literary Award (2022) granted by the Algeciras Fantástika Festival for fantasy and horror literature.

=== Selected first prizes ===
- XX Literary Contest “Villa de Medellín” (2023)
- Algeciras Fantástika Festival – Mystic Literary Award (2022)
- XXXI Villa de El Escorial “María Fuentetaja” Narrative Contest (2022)
- XX Short Story Contest “Saturnino Calleja” (2022)
- VIII “Marbella Activa” Short Story Contest (2021)
- XIII “Hypatia of Alexandria” Cybercontest for Short Literature, Lleida (2021)
- XLIII Juntas Florales of Tobarra – Short Story Category (2021)
- VIII Short Story Contest of the Castellón Bullfighting Federation (2021)
- VI International Microfiction Contest “Jorge Juan y Santacilia” (2019)
- XIX Hispano-Luso Literary Contest “José Antonio de Saravia” (2018)
- [Further awards omitted for brevity.]
