= Salim, Iran =

Salim (Persian: سليم) in Iran may refer to:

- Salim, Khuzestan
- Salim, West Azerbaijan
