= Kaizen Editores =

- Industry: Publishing
- Headquarters: Cádiz, Spain
- Area served: Spain, Argentina
- Owner: Kaizen Editores
- Divisions: La Alternativa Digital
- Website: www.kaizeneditores.com

Kaizen Editores was founded by two writers from Cádiz (Javier Fornell and Daniel Lanza Barba) with the aim of offering a high-quality self-publishing service. However, they soon launched their own publishing line, beginning their journey with the book Lito en Marte by Argentine illustrator Yael Lopumo in 2019, a work published in Buenos Aires. Since then, they have combined both publishing models, although traditional publishing gained prominence in 2022 with the launch of the Impacto collection and the noir fiction line.

They are committed to sustainable publishing, where “only the books that are going to be sold are printed,” as stated by Daniel Lanza Barba, one of the editors, in an effort to combat indiscriminate deforestation from their position within the publishing industry.

In 2024, in collaboration with the Cádiz City Council, they launched the city’s first Noir Week under the title Gaditanoir.

== Origin ==
Kaizen Editores was born by two writers from Cádiz with the aim of offering a quality self-publishing service. However, they soon launched their own publishing line, beginning their journey with the work "Lito en Marte" by the Argentine illustrator Yael Lopumo in 2019, a work published in Buenos Aires. Since that moment, they have combined both publishing modalities, although traditional publishing has gained weight since 2022 with the birth of the Impacto collection and the crime novel line.

They are committed to a sustainable edition in which "the books that are going to be sold are printed", according to Daniel Lanza, one of their editors, to fight against indiscriminate logging from his editorial position.

== Editorial Line ==
=== Historical novel ===
It has a historical novel line that began with "El caballero de la Frontera" by Margarita Lozano.

=== Noir ===
In 2020, the publisher launches a line of black literature "Tanguillos de Muerte" (Javier Fornell, 2020), which has grown with "Pasión y Muerte" by Luis Rodríguez Guerrero and "Corpore Insepulto" by Alberto Puyana, both with a high Cádiz content on its pages.

=== Impacto Collection ===
Also in 2022 they publish number 1 of the Impacto collection, which opens with the work "La odisea del Labrador" by the Murcian author Juan F. Marín. A collection that they define as a commitment to "authors with proven quality but who escape the pre-established canons of literary genres".

In 2023, the Impacto collection would grow with the works "El viaje de Maisah", by Santiago Pérez Malvido; and "El café de Levante" by Cristina Ruiz Guerrero.

=== Short Stories ===
In addition to the books that emerged from the Riverside awards, it has a line of stories in which the works of Javier Ramírez ("El arca de las mentias"), "Universos paralelos" (Joseph B. MacGregor, 2021) or "Un extraño caso de Diogenes" by Francisco Chaparro, among others.

=== Other topics ===
The publishing house has a line of educational projects, which began with Las Travesuras de Zolfa (Almudena Fuentes, 2019) and continued with "Cuentos para senderistas" by Algeciras professor Paco Estacio.

In 2022, it also launched a line of facsimiles with the work Spanish Scenery, by George Vivian.

=== Local themes ===
Among its editorial lines, local themes stand out, which began in 2019 with the publication of "El Obispo civil" by José Blas Fernández Sánchez, continuing with "Historia de una devoción" (Miguel García Díaz, 2020) and in 2021 with the charity publication "El Carnaval birlado. El libreto de 2021", which was repeated in 2022 y 2023", coordinated by Manolo Camacho, who in that same 2021 published in Kaizen Editores "Sandokán - Juan José. La vida tal cual viene", biography of the former Real Madrid player, Cádiz CF and from the Spanish Soccer Team Juan José Jiménez.

=== Kaizen Academic ===
In 2021 they launched a new editorial line with the aim of publicizing Thesis and research works that do not find a place in traditional publishing, starting the collection with "El Cádiz medieval a través de sus familias" by Javier Fornell; work that was followed by "Isis, la diosa del mar" by Israel Santamaría. In 2023 they published in this collection the works: "La visión de los monstruos en el mundo hispánico. Siglos XVI a XVIII" by Alejandra Flores de la Flor; and "Salinas de San Fernando I y II" by Alejandro Díaz Pintoo

== The Riverside Adwards ==
In 2021 they presented the first The Riverside Story Prize, dedicated to the theme of intrigue and crime in coastal areas, which is awarded annually in Barbate. From 2023, the prize is endowed with €150 for the winner and the publication of the anthology with the finalist stories.

Year	Awards	Winner	Winning Story	Finalists
2021	I	Santiago Pérez Malvido	Nocturno en plata y azul	Alberto Puyana; Cristina Vázquez Torres; Ivan Guirola Gómez; Juan Carlos Candón Andrades; Juan José López Cartón; Luis M. Rossi; Manuel Monge Lorenzo; Marco Antonio Marcos Fernández; María Martínez García.
2022	II	Cristina Ruiz Guerrero	El bar del puerto	Esteban Sánchez Toscano; Aurora Ponferrada Espinosa; Paco Martínez; Sara Revuelta; Máximo Rodríguez; Cristina Granado Piñero; Juana Mª Andrades Navarro; Ana Ibáñez Mejías; Conchi Fernández.
2023	III	Jesús Relinque Pérez	Los invasores	Manuela B. C.; María Dolores Malia Fernández.; Patricia Gallardo

== Authors ==
- Alberto Castrelo
- Alberto Puyana
- Almudena Fuentes Puntas
- Cristina Ruiz Guerrero
- Eduardo Formanti
- Francisco Chaparro
- Javier Fornell
- Javier Ramirez
- Jesús Relinque
- José Blas Fernández Sánchez
- Juan F. Marín
- Juan Manuel Sainz Peña
- Luis Rodríguez Guerrero
- Luis Rossi
- Miguel García Díaz
- Pedro Padilla
- Rafael Marín
- Santiago Pérez Malvido
- Yael Leonardo Lopumo
