= Shalim =

God in the Canaanite religion pantheon

- God of dusk
- Venerated in: Canaanite religion
- Planet: Venus

Genealogy
- Parents: El (father) Asherah (mother)
- Siblings: Shahar

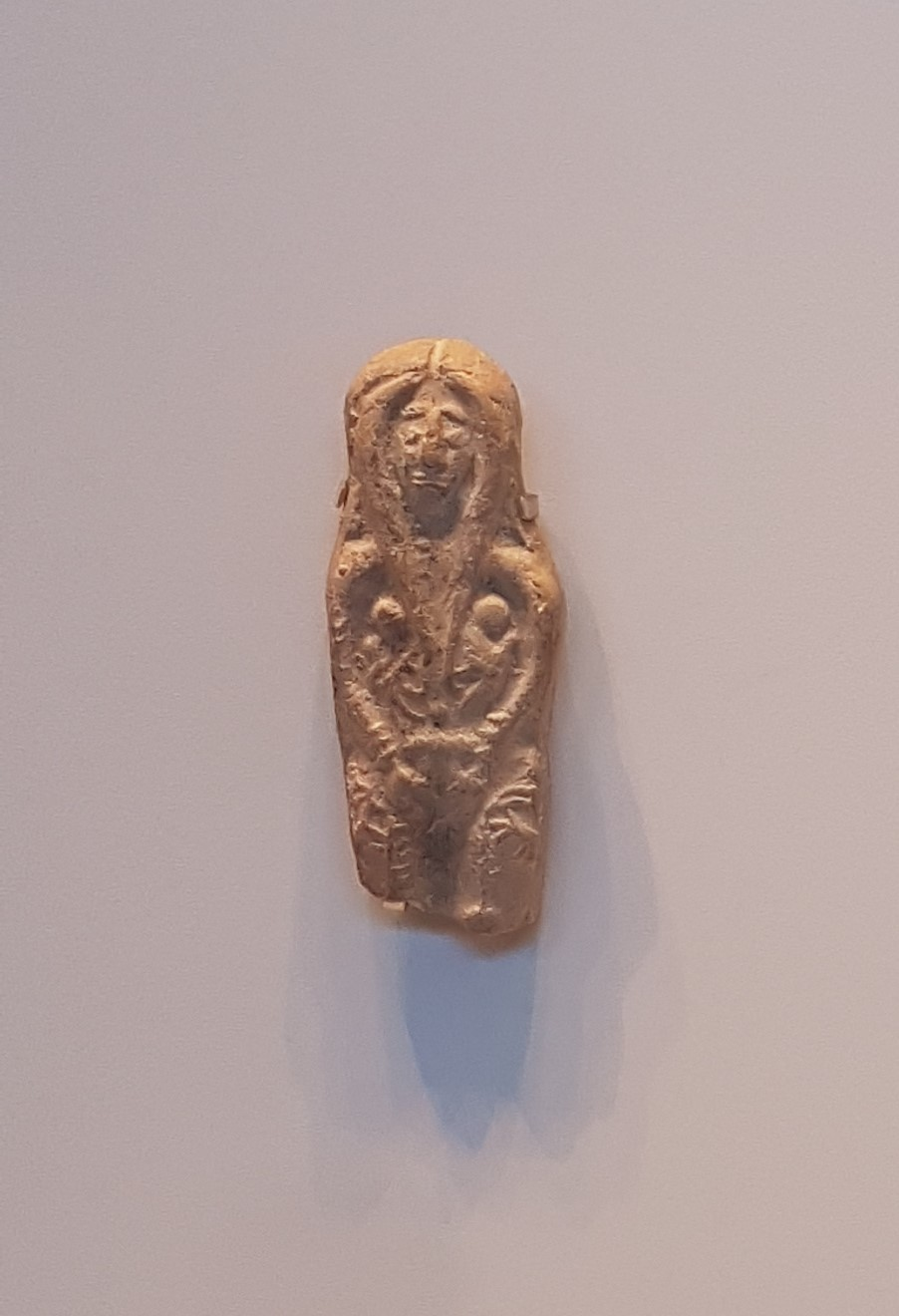
Photograph

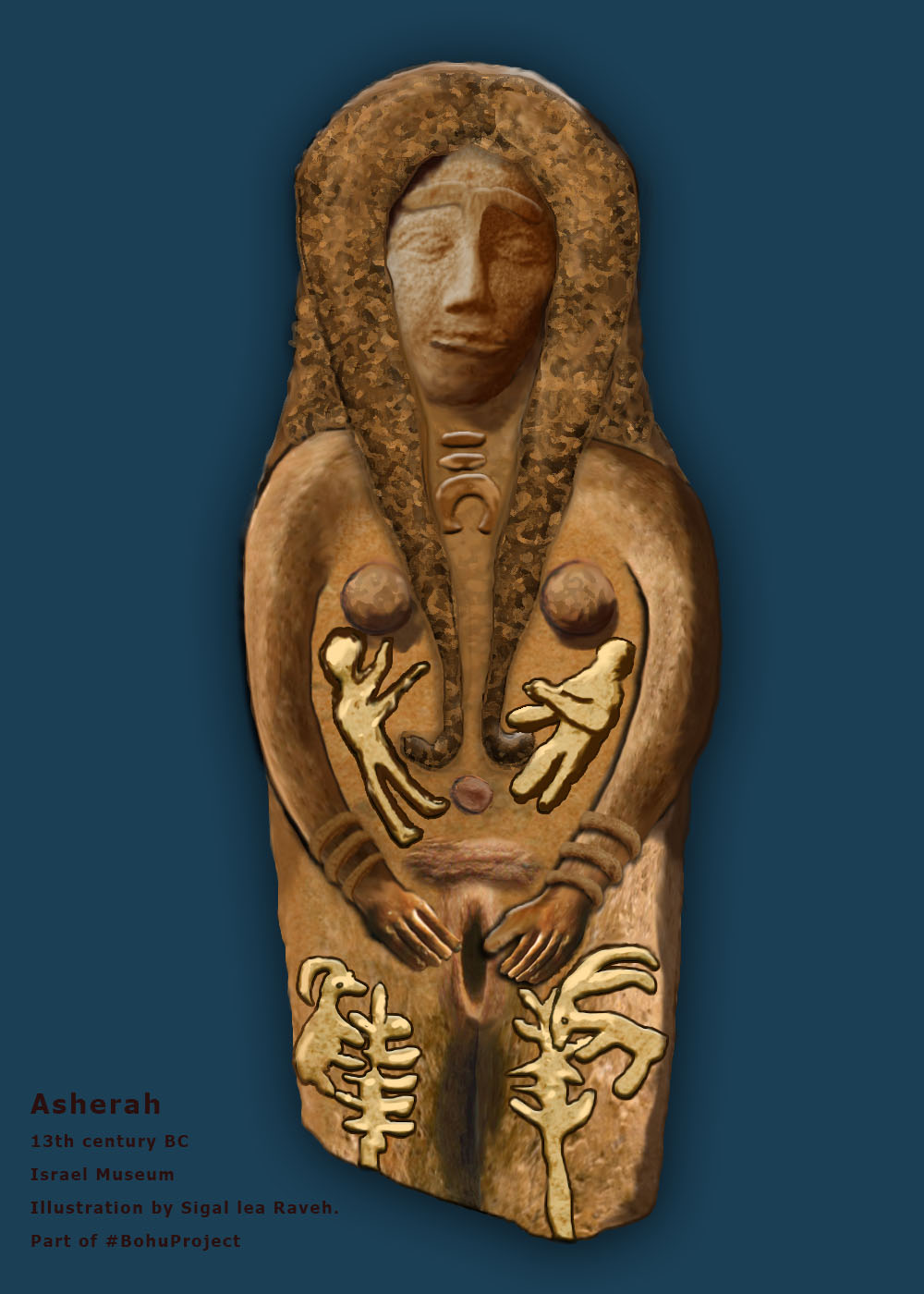
Diagram

13th-century BC statuette depicting the goddess Asherah nursing the twins Shahar and Shalim. Asherah's symbols, the sacred tree and the ibex, appear on her thighs. The figurine may have been held by women in childbirth.

Shalim (Šalām, Shalem, Ugaritic: 𐎌𐎍𐎎, romanized: ŠLM) is a god in Canaanite religion, mentioned in inscriptions found in Ugarit (now Ras Shamra, Syria). William F. Albright identified Shalim as the god of the dusk and Shahar as the god of the dawn. In the Dictionary of Deities and Demons in the Bible, Venus is represented by Shalim as the Evening Star and Shahar as the Morning Star. His name derives from the triconsonantal Semitic root Š-L-M ("whole, safe, sound, peace").

== Ugaritic inscriptions ==
An Ugaritic myth known as The Gracious and Most Beautiful Gods describes Shalim and his brother Shahar as offspring of El through two women he meets at the seashore. They are both nursed by "The Lady", likely Asherah, and have appetites as large as "(one) lip to the earth and (one) lip to the heaven." In other Ugaritic texts, the two are associated with the sun goddess.

Another inscription is a sentence repeated three times in a para-mythological text, "Let me invoke the gracious gods, the voracious gods of ym." Ym in most Semitic languages means "day," and Shalim and Shahar, twin deities of the dusk and dawn, were conceived of as its beginning and end.

Shalim is also mentioned separately in the Ugaritic god lists and forms of his name also appear in personal names, perhaps as a divine name or epithet.

Many scholars believe that the name of Shalim is preserved in the name of the city Jerusalem. The god Shalim may have been associated with dusk and the evening star in the etymological senses of a "completion" of the day, "sunset" and "peace".

== See also ==
- Shahar (god)

== Bibliography ==
- Albright, William Foxwell (1990) [1968]. Yahweh and the gods of Canaan: a historical analysis of two contrasting faiths (Reprint ed.). Eisenbrauns. ISBN 978-0-931464-01-0.
- Golan, Ariel (2003). Prehistoric religion: mythology, symbolism. Ariel Golan (Original from the University of Virginia. ISBN 978-965-90555-0-0.
- van der Toorn, Karel; Becking, Bob; van der Horst, Pieter Willem (1999). Dictionary of Deities and Demons in the Bible DDD (2nd, revised ed.). Wm. B. Eerdmans Publishing. ISBN 9780802824912.
