= Mohammad Salimi (TV presenter) =

Iranian television presenter

- Born: Mohammad Salimi; 19 January 1984 (age 42); Tehran
- Education: PHD of the science communication
- Occupation: presenter

Mohammad Salimi (Persian: محمد سلیمی) (born January 19, 1984, in Tehran) is an Iranian presenter and TV host. He has a PhD in science communication. His first live show was Aftab-e SHarghi in 2007, followed by Simay-e khanvadeh, Tab, and Taz-e SHo. He also appeared on Lebas-e Irani. He is a fashion and clothing presenter. He has hosted several Fajr international fashion and clothing festivals.
