= Javier Fornell =

Spanish writer

Francisco Javier Fornell Fernández
- Born: 6 December 1978 (age 47); Cádiz, Spain

Francisco Javier Fornell Fernández (born 6 December 1978) is a Spanish novelist, cultural manager, and historian, specialized in noble lineages and families in the Late Middle Ages. He is also a regular columnist for the Vocento media group.

== Biography ==
Fornell Fernández earned a degree in History in 2000 and obtained his PhD cum laude in Medieval History in 2016 with the dissertation Linajes y familias bajomedievales en el ámbito de la Bahía de Cádiz. Siglos XIII a XV, supervised by Arturo Morgado García and Rafael Sánchez Saus at the University of Cádiz. His research focuses on late medieval society and lineages, particularly in the Cádiz region. He has published various scholarly and popular articles in multiple journals.

He has also published several books, including Linajes gaditanos en la Baja Edad Media. He has combined his research with work as a project coordinator for the University of Massachusetts in Spain (2013–2018) and at Hunter College, New York (2019), as well as teaching at the Cádiz extension of the Universidad San Dámaso (2012–2018). In 2017, he founded Sur Tour, a company dedicated to experiential tourism based on the slow travel philosophy. That same year, he began teaching in master's programs in education and ICT at Universidad Antonio de Nebrija.

In addition to his academic activity, he is also active as a novelist. His historical novels have been published by Ediciones Mayi (Llamadme Cabrón. Historia de un pirata, Lanza y oro) and Kaizen Editores (Tanguillos de muerte). An animal lover, he has also written cynological studies published on the website Toppercan since 2017.

He is involved in historical outreach, regularly appearing on local television programs such as El Farol (Onda Cádiz). From 1997 to 2010, he co-founded and coordinated historical magazines through the association Ubi Sunt?, alongside historians Ángel Quintana and Francisco Glicero Conde.

In 2019, he co-founded the independent publishing house Kaizen Editores with Daniel Lanza Barba, promoting sustainable publishing practices and reducing paper print volumes for environmental responsibility.

== Awards ==
Fornell Fernández has received the following awards:

- I Premio de Investigación Hades (2006)
- III Premio de Investigación Hades (2008, for two works)
- Honorable mention (accésit) in the III Premio de Investigación Hades (2010)

The Hades Research Awards are sponsored by the University of Cádiz, the City Council of Cádiz, and Cemabasa.

== Works ==
His work is divided into fiction and non-fiction. In the former, Javier Fornell employs a fast-paced and agile language. Focused on historical novels, the writer Jesús Maeso de la Torre has said that Fornell combines the best of Umberto Eco in atmosphere creation and of Arturo Pérez-Reverte in the ease of narrating adventures, which has contributed to the warm reception of his books. According to the author himself, he aims to present one of the most overlooked periods of Andalusian history in an engaging way. In 2017, he made his first foray into children's literature with the commissioned book Una vaca vasca, which compiles stories and legends from the Basque Country in short tales told through the eyes of a cow.

In the field of non-fiction, his studies have focused on the society of medieval Cádiz, especially the development of the families and noble lineages that shaped the city between the 13th and 16th centuries.

=== Fiction ===
- Llamadme Cabrón. Historia de un pirata (2010), Ediciones Mayi
- Lanza y oro. Desventuras de Pedro Cabrón (2013), Ediciones Mayi
- “El seguro de vida”, in 13 Puñaladas (2013), Dos Mil Locos Editores
- “La reina niña”, in Vampiralia (2014)
- Una vaca vasca. Cuentos del País Vasco (2017), Lan Mobel Home
- “Cruce de caminos”, in Murillo. Retrato de un genio (2017), Editorial Perímetro
- Guía mitológica de Cádiz (2021), Kaizen Editores
- Tanguillos de muerte (2023), Kaizen Editores

=== Translations ===
- Rupert de Hentzu (2020), Kaizen Editores
- Walden o la vida en los bosques (2021), Kaizen Editores
- Memorias póstumas de Brás Cubas (2023), Kaizen Editores
- Carta de una desconocida (2024), Kaizen Editores
- Momentos estelares de la Humanidad (2023), Kaizen Editores
- Autobiografía de Benjamín Franklin (2023), Kaizen Editores

=== Non-fiction ===
- Magia, Brujería y Esoterismo en la Historia (ed., 2006), Asociación Cultural Ubi Sunt
- Historia del Puerto de Santa María desde su incorporación a los dominios cristianos en 1259 hasta el año mil ochocientos (2009)
- Linajes gaditanos en la Baja Edad Media. Breve estudio de la oligarquía local (siglos XIII–XV) (2010)
- El Cádiz medieval a través de sus familias. Estudios de los linajes gaditanos del siglo XIII al XVI (2020)

=== Book chapters ===
- “Gaditanos en los conflictos dinásticos castellanos de fines del XV: Juan Sánchez de Cádiz y Antón Bernal,” in Marginados, disidentes y olvidados en la historia (2009)
- “Eduardo de Woodstock: un Lancelot en la Corte de Pedro el Cruel,” in Héroes y Villanos en la Historia (2011)

=== Selected articles ===
- “De Alfonso X al Emporio del Orbe. Cádiz en la Baja Edad Media,” in Ubi Sunt? Revista de historia, no. 18 (2005), pp. 8–13
- “El control de la Iglesia como fuente de poder en la Baja Edad Media: los Argumedo gaditanos,” in Ubi Sunt? Revista de historia, no. 23 (2008), pp. 122–130
- “La entrada en la cristiandad como factor dinamizador del comercio gaditano en la Baja Edad Media,” in Ubi Sunt? Revista de historia, no. 22 (2008), pp. 49–62
- “Los Fonte en Cádiz: un ejemplo de comerciantes catalanes en Andalucía,” in Trocadero. Revista de historia moderna y contemporánea, no. 23 (2010), pp. 165–174
