= Sālimiyya =

Sālimiyya (Arabic: السالمية) was a Sufi movement in Basra, named after Muhammad ibn Ahmad ibn Salim (d. 297/909) and his son Ahmad (d. 356/967). They believed that the individual letters and sounds of the Qur'an are eternal.

Followers of the movement are known as Salimis.
