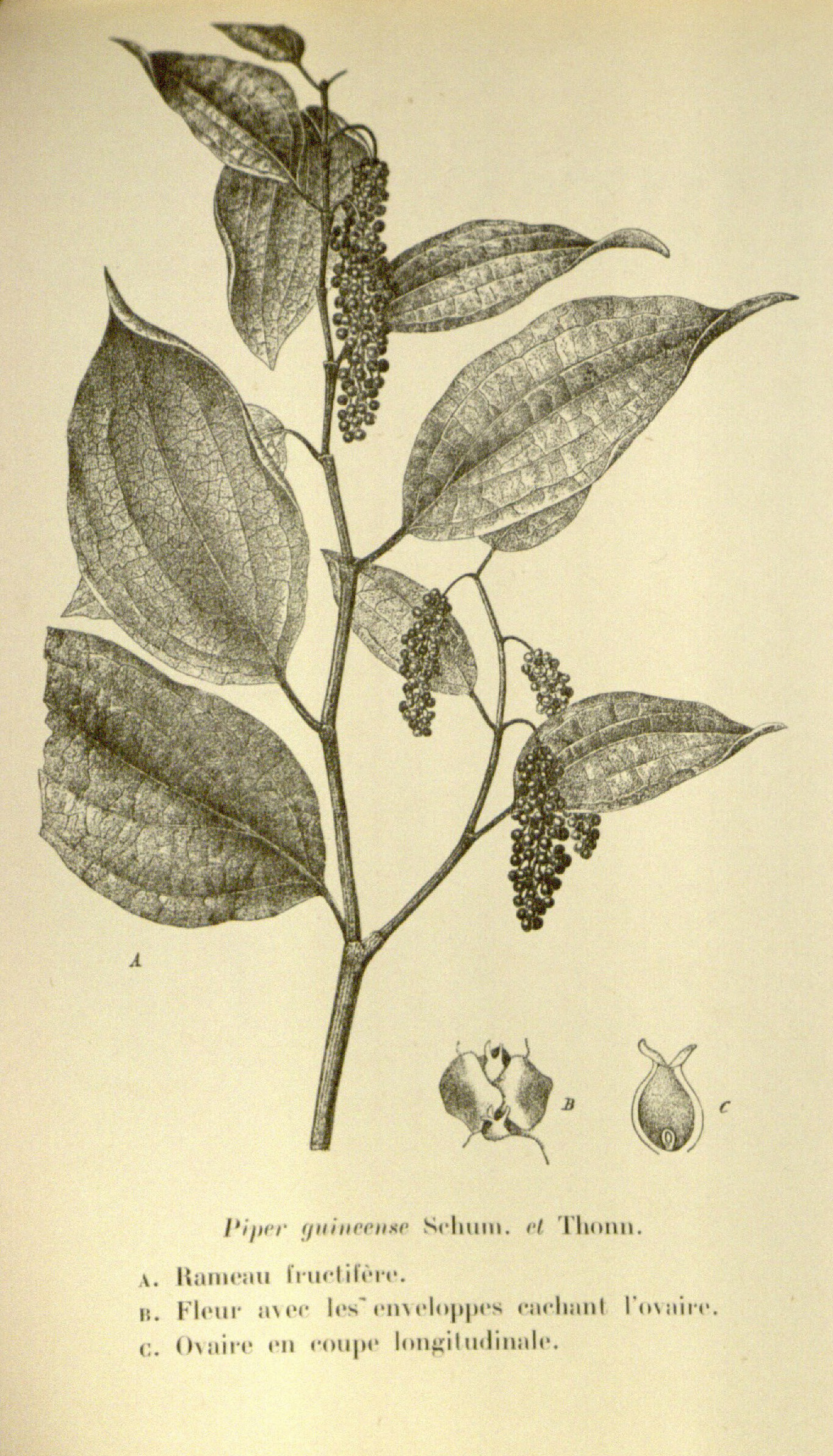

Scientific classification
- Kingdom: Plantae
- Clade: Tracheophytes
- Clade: Angiosperms
- Clade: Magnoliids
- Order: Piperales
- Family: Piperaceae
- Genus: Piper
- Species: P. guineense

Binomial name
- Piper guineense Schumach.

Synonyms
- Piper clusii C.DC.

= Piper guineense =

Species of flowering plant

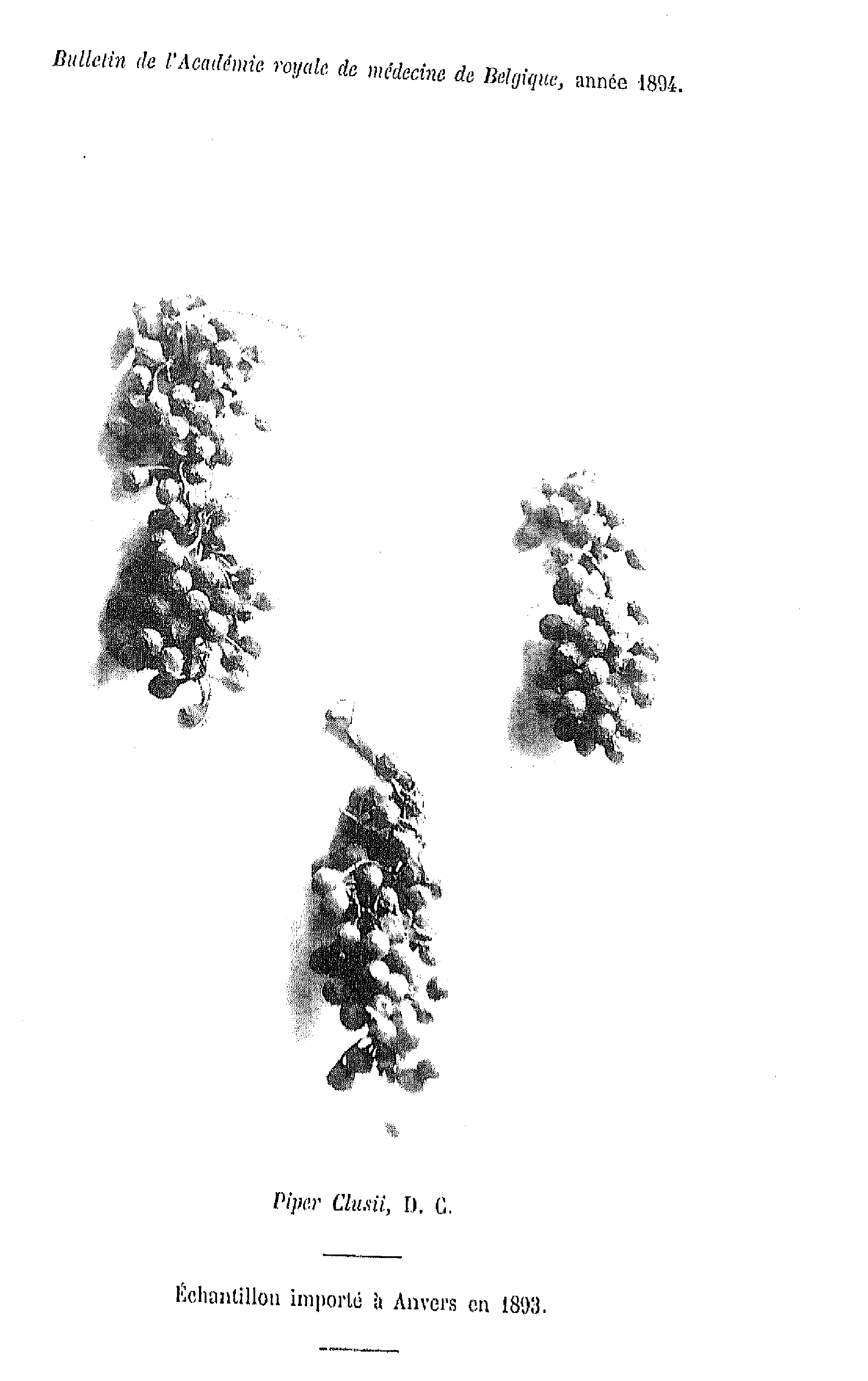
Samples of "Piper clusii" imported into Belgium from the Congo in 1895.

Piper guineense is a West African species of Piper; the spice derived from its dried fruit is known as Ashanti pepper, Benin pepper, Edo pepper, false cubeb, Guinea cubeb, and called locally kale, kukauabe, masoro, etiñkeni, sasema, soro wisa, eyendo, eshasha by the Urhobo people, iyere or ata-iyere by the Yoruba and oziza and uziza by the Igbo people of Nigeria. It is a close relative of cubeb pepper and a relative of black pepper and long pepper. Unlike cubeb, which is large and spherical in shape, Ashanti pepper grains are prolate spheroids, smaller and smoother than cubeb pepper in appearance and generally bear a reddish tinge. The stalks of Ashanti pepper berries are also distinctly curved whilst those of cubeb pepper are completely straight. The terms West African pepper and Guinea pepper have also been used, but are ambiguous and may refer to grains of Selim or grains of paradise.

The plants that provide Ashanti pepper are vines that can grow up to 20 m in length, climbing up boles of trees by means of adventitious roots. These are native to topical regions of Central and Western Africa and are semi-cultivated in countries such as Nigeria where the leaves, known as uziza, are used as a flavouring for stews. Like other members of the pepper family, Ashanti pepper contains 5–8% of the chemical piperine which gives them their piquant taste. They contain large amounts of beta-caryophyllene, which is being investigated as an anti-inflammatory agent. It also contains significant proportions (up to around 10%) of myristicin, elemicin, safrole, and dillapiol, as well as some apiole (around 1.4%).

In terms of flavour, Ashanti pepper is very similar to cubeb pepper but is less bitter and has a fresher, more herbaceous flavour and aroma than cubeb's more pine-like scent. Though known in Europe during the Middle Ages (it was a common spice in Rouen and Dieppe in 14th-century France), these days, its use is largely concentrated in West and Central Africa.

== Use in cuisine ==
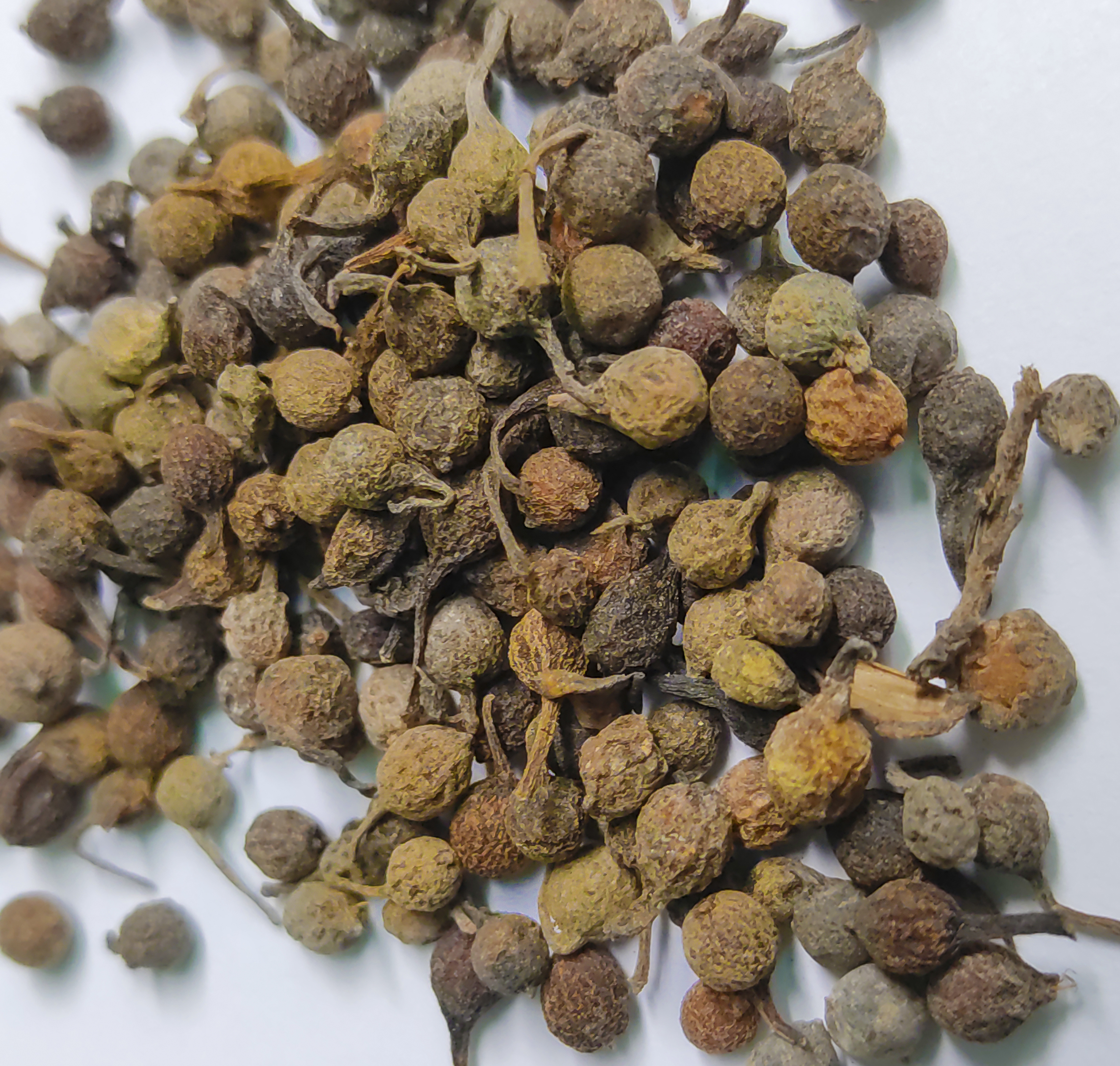
Ashanti pepper (dried fruits)

It is used in West African cuisine where it imparts spiciness and a pungent aroma to stews. Even in West Africa, Ashanti pepper is an expensive spice and is used sparingly. Often, a few grains are ground in a pestle and mortar before being added (along with black pepper) to soups or to boiled rice. The spice can also be substituted in any recipe calling for cubeb pepper, where Ashanti imparts a less bitter flavour. The pepper is also sometimes one of the ingredients in the Berbere spice mix used in the cuisines of Ethiopia and of Eritrea. However, West African Pepper is a highly esteemed spice in its region of origin and may be hard to get abroad; thus, long pepper is more often used in Berbere.

== As a preservative ==
Research shows that Ashanti peppers have preservative and anti-oxidant properties. In a comparison study of three native West African peppers on the preservation of catfish, Ashanti peppers were discovered to be the most effective.
