= Nahr-e Salim =

Nahr-e Salim نهرسليم
- Village
- Location within Iran
- Coordinates: 30°06′09″N 48°26′02″E
- Country: Iran
- Province: Khuzestan
- County: Abadan
- Bakhsh: Arvandkenar
- Rural District: Minubar

Population (2006)
  - Total: 1,138
- Time zone: UTC+3:30 (IRST)
  - Summer (DST): UTC+4:30 (IRDT)

Nahr-e Salim (Persian: نهرسليم, also Romanized as Nahr-e Salīm; also known as Salīm) is a village in Minubar Rural District, Arvandkenar District, Abadan County, Khuzestan Province, Iran. At the 2006 census, its population was 1,138, in 266 families.
