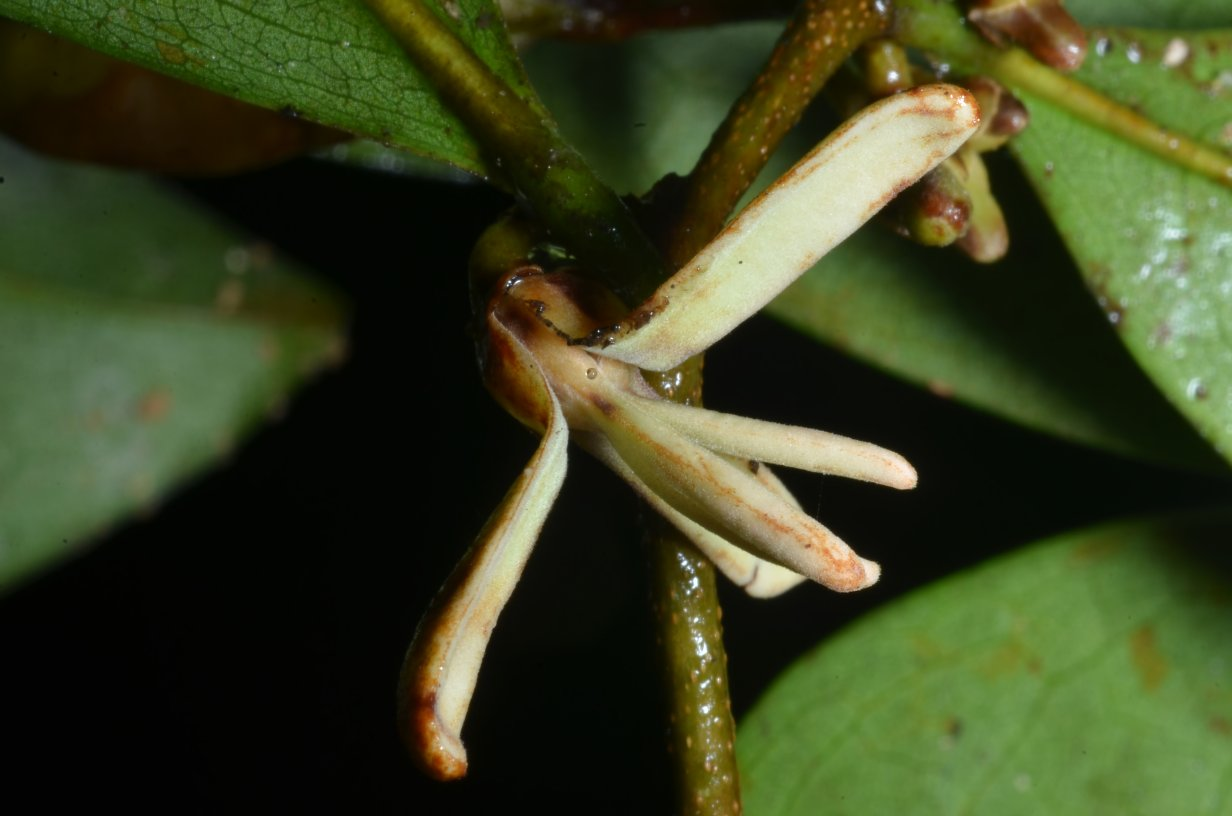

Conservation status
- Least Concern (IUCN 3.1)

Scientific classification
- Kingdom: Plantae
- Clade: Embryophytes
- Clade: Tracheophytes
- Clade: Spermatophytes
- Clade: Angiosperms
- Clade: Magnoliids
- Order: Magnoliales
- Family: Annonaceae
- Genus: Xylopia
- Species: X. quintasii

Binomial name
- Xylopia quintasii Pierre ex Engl. & Diels
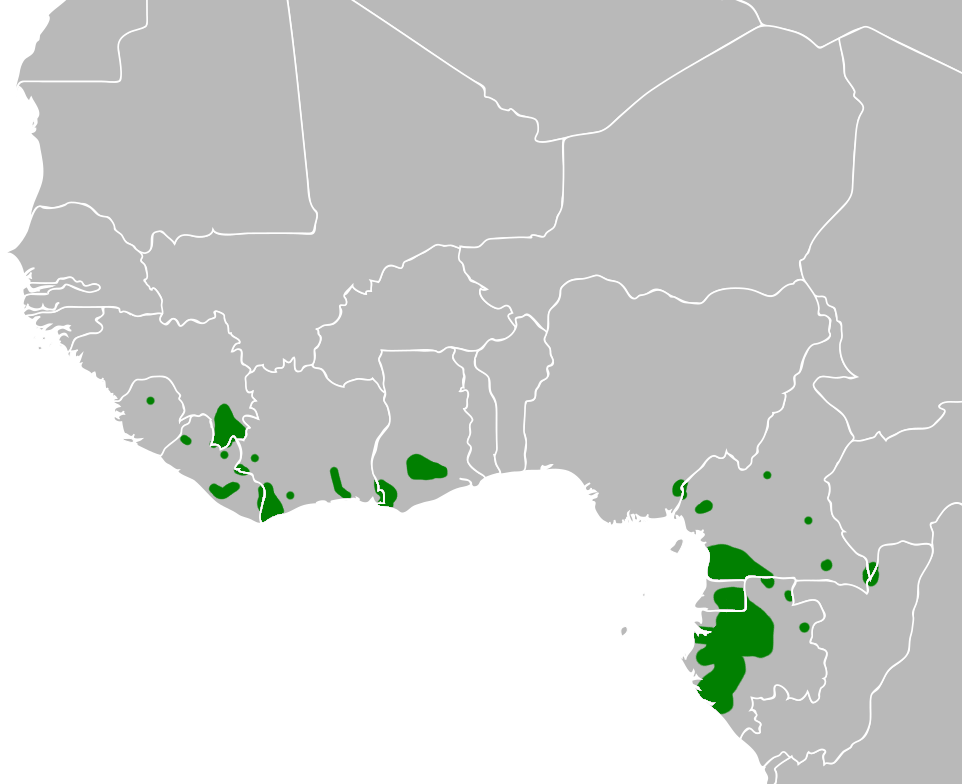
- Range map of Xylopia quintasii

Synonyms
- Polyalthia mayumbensis Exell; Xylopia lane-poolei Sprague & Hutch.; Xylopia striata Engl.

= Xylopia quintasii =

Species of plant

Xylopia quintasii, commonly known as Elo, is a species of evergreen tree, in the family Annonaceae that grows 20-25 metres tall. Xylopia quintasii can tolerate temperatures above at least 1°C. Its leaves are oblanceolate and petiolate. Xylopia quintasii produces six star-shaped flowers. Xylopia quintasii is native to West Africa. It is known as Aghako in Ghana and Mvomba in Cameroon.

== Distribution ==
Xylopia quintasii is native to west and west-central tropical Africa, ranging from Senegal to Democratic Republic of the Congo. Xylopia quintasii is commonly found in evergreen and deciduous forests and coastal thickets. This species is present in the following countries:

- Angola
- Cameroon
- Central African Republic
- Republic of the Congo
- Democratic Republic of the Congo
- Côte d'Ivoire
- Equatorial Guinea
- Gabon
- Gambia
- Ghana
- Guinea
- Liberia
- Nigeria
- São Tomé and Príncipe
- Senegal
- Sierra Leone

== Uses ==
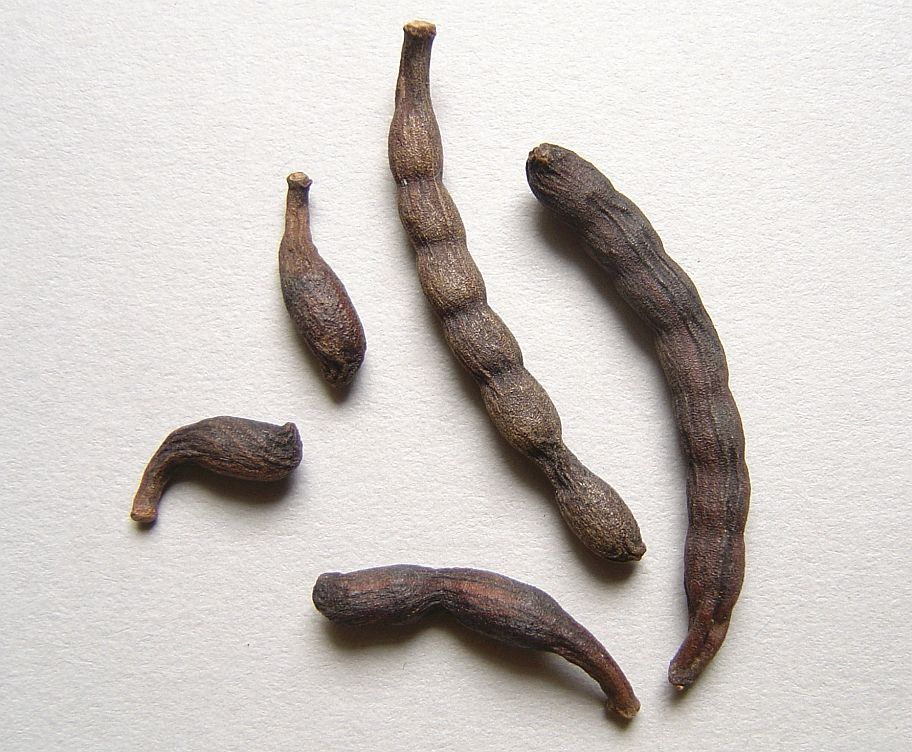
Grains of Selim

Xylopia quintasii is not commonly sold on the international market and is usually only used for local purposes. It is sometimes used in Grains of Selim and is smoked. The wood of Xylopia quintasii is used for house building in posts, poles, and planks. It can also have other uses like bowls, plates, weapons, tools, toys, etc. Many parts of Xylopia quintasii are used in traditional medicine. The bark is used to treat illnesses like bronchitis and pneumonia. The inner bark is used to treat swellings. A lotion can be prepared from the bark to treat headaches.
