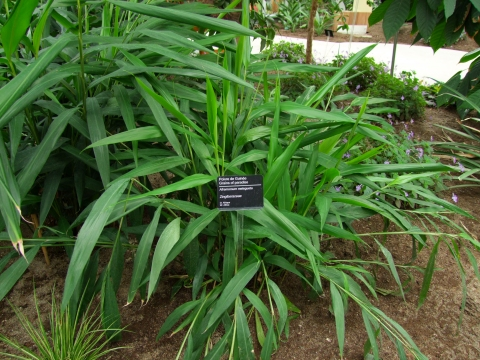

Scientific classification
- Kingdom: Plantae
- Clade: Tracheophytes
- Clade: Angiosperms
- Clade: Monocots
- Clade: Commelinids
- Order: Zingiberales
- Family: Zingiberaceae
- Genus: Aframomum
- Species: A. melegueta

Binomial name
- Aframomum melegueta K. Schum.

Synonyms
- Amomum melegueta

= Grains of paradise =

Grains of paradise Aframomum melegueta

Species of flowering plant

Grains of paradise (Aframomum melegueta) is a species in the ginger family, Zingiberaceae, and closely related to cardamom. Its seeds are used as a spice (ground or whole); it imparts a pungent, black-pepper-like flavor with hints of citrus. It is also known as melegueta pepper, Guinea grains, ossame, or fom wisa, and is sometimes confused with alligator pepper. The terms African pepper and Guinea pepper have also been used, but are ambiguous as they can apply to other spices such as grains of Selim (Xylopia aethiopica). In Cameroon, the name is jujube, not to be confused with the jujube, fruit of Ziziphus jujuba

It is native to West Africa, which is sometimes named the Pepper Coast (or Grain Coast) because of this commodity. It is also an important cash crop in the Basketo district of southern Ethiopia.

== Characteristics ==
Aframomum melegueta is an herbaceous perennial plant native to swampy habitats along the West African coast. Its trumpet-shaped, purple flowers develop into pods 5–7 cm (2–3 in) long, containing numerous small, reddish-brown seeds.

The pungent, peppery taste of the seeds is caused by aromatic ketones, such as (6)-paradol (systematic name: 1-(4-hydroxy-3-methoxyphenyl)-decan-3-one). Essential oils, which are the dominating flavor components in the closely related cardamom, occur only in traces.

The stem can sometimes be short and usually shows signs of scars and dropped leaves. The leaves are narrow and similar to bamboo, with a well-structured vascular system. The flowers of the herbaceous plant are aromatic, with an orange-colored lip and a rich pinkish-orange upper part. The fruits contain numerous small, golden, red-brown seeds.

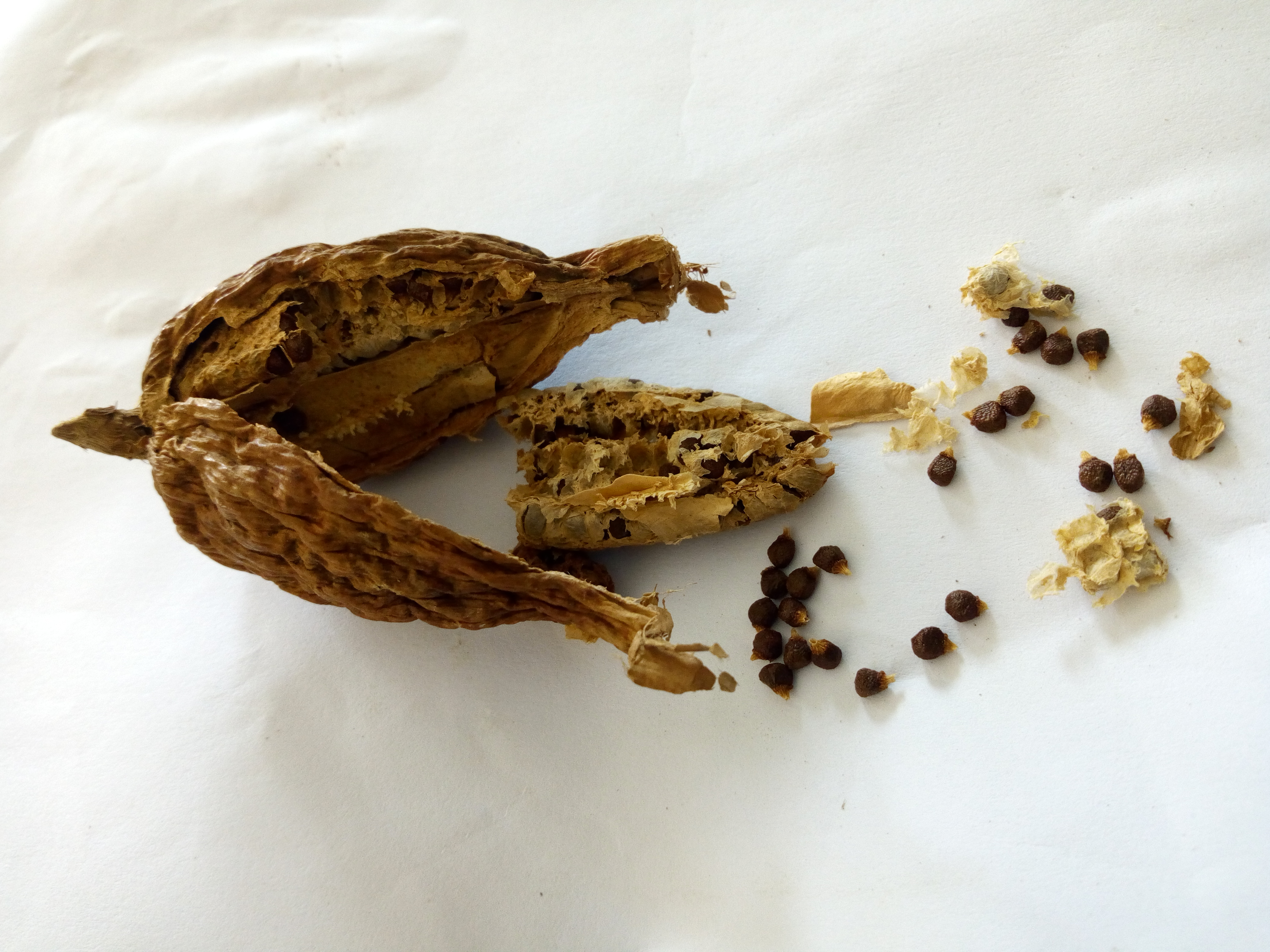
Dried pod and seeds of Aframomum melegueta

== Ecology ==
Melegueta is a major component in the diet of Western Lowland gorilla—around 80 to 90 percent. The gorillas eat the entire fruit and act as a source of seed dispersal for melegueta. In addition to food, the plant is the most common material used to make nests and beds.

== Uses ==
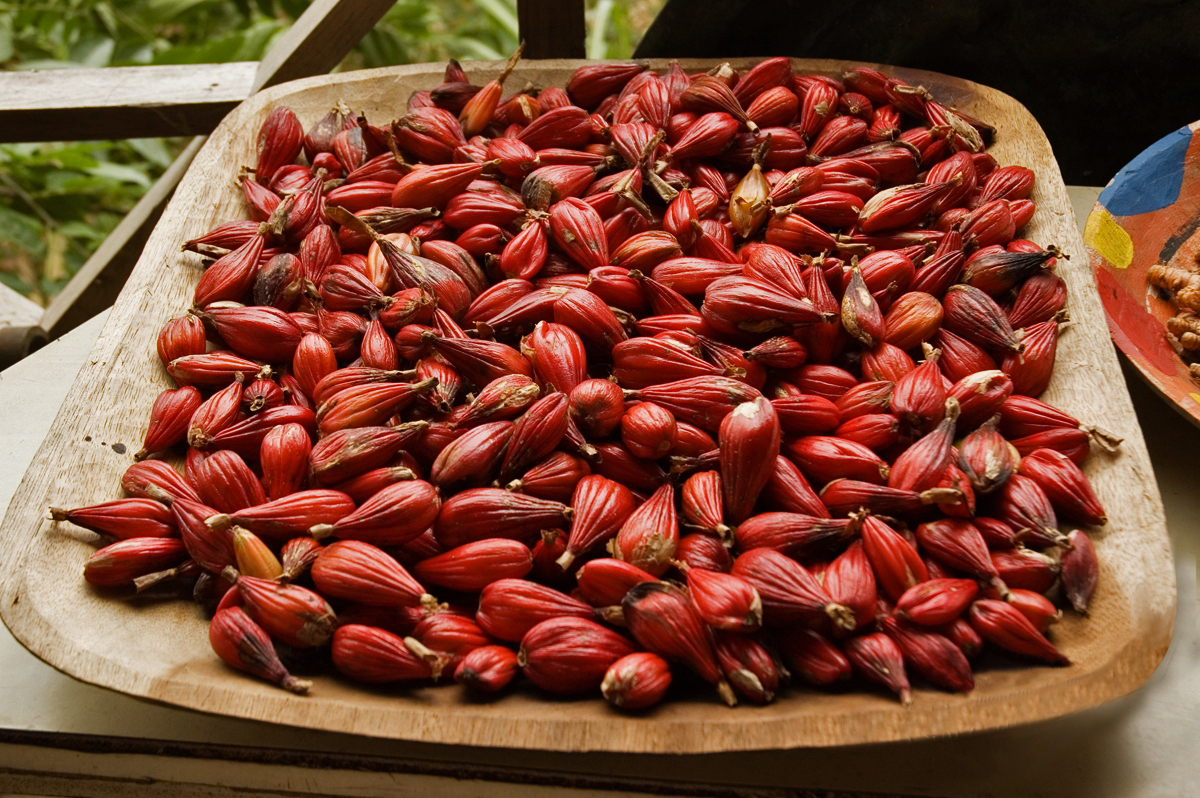
A. melegueta pods at a market in São João dos Angolares, São Tomé Island.

Melegueta pepper is commonly used in the cuisines of West and North Africa, from where it has been traditionally transported by camel caravan routes through the Sahara desert and distributed to Sicily and the rest of Italy. Mentioned by Pliny as "African pepper" but subsequently forgotten in Europe, they were renamed "grains of paradise" and became a popular substitute for black pepper in Europe in the 14th and 15th centuries. The Ménagier de Paris recommends it for improving wine that "smells stale". Through the Middle Ages and into the early modern period, the theory of the four humors governed theories about nourishment on the part of doctors, herbalists, and druggists. In this context, John Russell characterized grains of paradise in The Boke of Nurture as "hot and moist".

In 1469, King Afonso V of Portugal granted the monopoly of trade in the Gulf of Guinea to Lisbon merchant Fernão Gomes. This included the exclusivity in trade of Aframomum melegueta, then called malagueta pepper. The grant came at the cost of 100,000 real annually and agreement to explore 160 kilometres (100 mi) of the coast of Africa per year for five years; this gives some indication of the European value of the spice. After Christopher Columbus reached the New World in 1492 and brought the first samples of the chili pepper (Capsicum frutescens) back with him to Europe, the name malagueta, and Spanish and Portuguese spelling, was then applied to the new chili "pepper" because its piquancy was reminiscent of grains of paradise. Malagueta, thanks to its low price, remained popular in Europe even after the Portuguese opened the direct maritime route to the Spice Islands around 1500. This namesake, the malagueta chili, remains popular in Brazil, the Caribbean, Portugal, and Mozambique.

The importance of the A. melegueta spice is shown by the area's designation from the St. John River (near present-day Buchanan) to Harper in Liberia as the Grain Coast or Pepper Coast in honor of the availability of grains of paradise. Later, the craze for the spice waned, and its uses were reduced to a flavoring for sausages and beer. In the 18th century, its importation to Great Britain collapsed after an act of Parliament during the reign of George III forbade its use in alcoholic beverages. In 1855, England imported about 6,800 to 8,600 kilograms (15,000 to 19,000 lb) per year legally (duty paid). By 1880, the 9th edition of the Encyclopædia Britannica reported: "Grains of paradise are to some extent used in veterinary practice, but for the most part illegally to give a fictitious strength to malt liquors, gin, and cordials".

The presence of the seeds in the diets of lowland gorillas in the wild seems to have some sort of beneficial effect on their cardiovascular health. They also eat the leaves and use them for bedding material. The absence of seeds in the diets of captive lowland gorillas may contribute to their occasionally poor cardiovascular health in zoos.

Today, the condiment is sometimes used in gourmet cuisine as a replacement for pepper, and to give a unique flavor in some craft beers, gins, and Norwegian akvavit. Alton Brown is a fan of the condiment, and he uses it in okra stew and his apple-pie recipe on an episode of the TV cooking show Good Eats.

== Folk medicine and ritual uses ==
In West African folk medicine, grains of paradise are valued for their warming and digestive properties, and among the Efik people in Nigeria have been used for divination and ordeals determining guilt. A. melegueta has been introduced to the Caribbean and Latin America, where it is used in Voodoo religious rites. It is also found widely among Protestant Christian practitioners of African-American hoodoo and rootwork, where the seeds are employed in luck-bringing and may be held in the mouth or chewed to prove sincerity.

== See also ==
- Aframomum corrorima - also known as Ethiopian cardamom, false cardamom, or korarima
- List of culinary herbs and spices
- Phytotherapy
