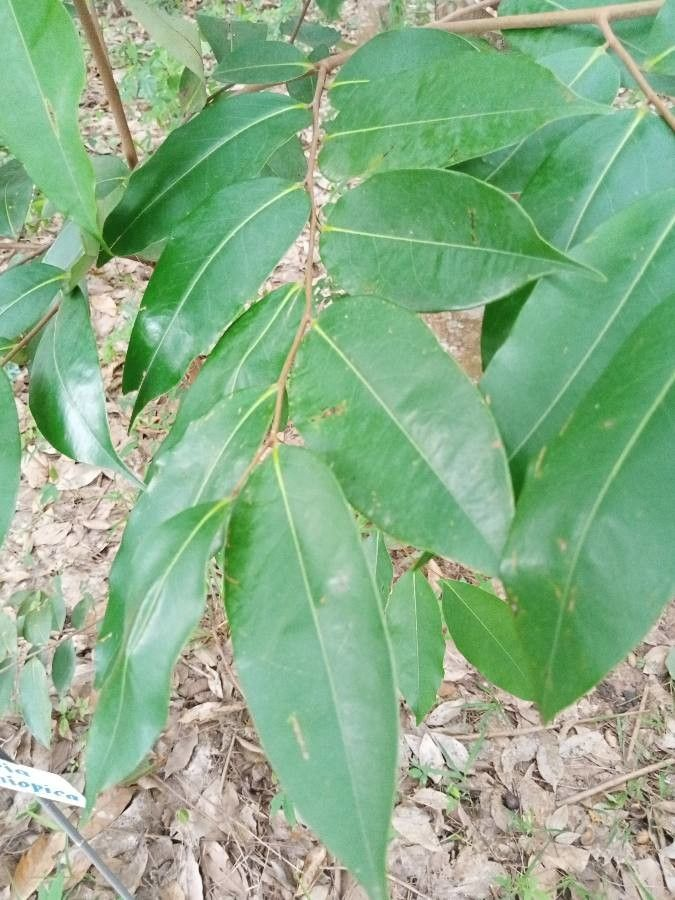
- Xylopia aethiopica plant

Conservation status
- Least Concern (IUCN 3.1)

Scientific classification
- Kingdom: Plantae
- Clade: Tracheophytes
- Clade: Angiosperms
- Clade: Magnoliids
- Order: Magnoliales
- Family: Annonaceae
- Genus: Xylopia
- Species: X. aethiopica

Binomial name
- Xylopia aethiopica (Dunal) A. Rich.

= Xylopia aethiopica =

Species of plant

Xylopia aethiopica is an evergreen, aromatic tree, of the Annonaceae family that can grow up to 20m high. It is native to the lowland rainforest and moist fringe forests in the savanna zones of Africa.

The dried fruits of X. aethiopica (grains of Selim) are used as a spice and an herbal medicine.

== Etymology ==
Xylopia is a compression from Greek ξυλον πικρον (xylon pikron) meaning "bitter wood". The second part of the plant's binomial name, aethiopica, refers to the origin of the tree, in Ethiopia, though currently it grows most prominently as a crop in Ghana, Togo and other parts of West Africa .

== Distribution ==
Xylopia aethiopica grows in tropical Africa. It is present in rain forests, especially near the coast. It also grows in riverine and fringing forest, and as a pioneer species in arid savanna regions.

This species is present in the following countries:

- Angola
- Benin
- Burkina Faso
- Cameroon
- The Central African Republic
- The Democratic Republic of the Congo (indigenous)
- Ethiopia (indigenous)
- Gabon
- The Gambia
- Ghana (indigenous)
- Guinea
- Guinea-Bissau
- Ivory Coast
- Kenya (indigenous)
- Liberia
- Mozambique (indigenous)
- Nigeria (indigenous)
- São Tomé and Príncipe
- Senegal (indigenous)
- Sierra Leone
- Sudan
- South Sudan
- Tanzania (indigenous)
- Togo
- Uganda (indigenous)
- Zambia

== Uses ==
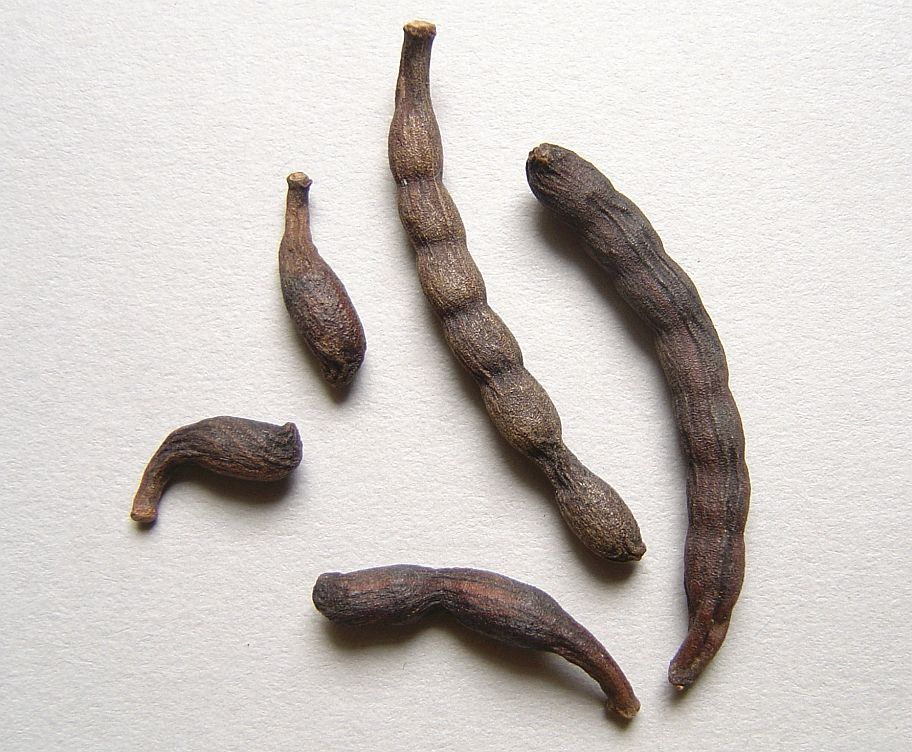
The dried fruit of Xylopia aethiopica, used as a spice called Grains of Selim.

Xylopia aethiopica is used extensively in construction, African cuisine and traditional medicine.

The plant's bark is used to make doors and partitions. The wood is known to be resistant to termite attack and is used in hut construction: posts, scantlings, roof-ridges and joists. The wood is also used for boat construction: masts, oars, paddles and spars. In Togo and Gabon, wood was traditionally used to make bows and crossbows for hunters and warriors.

An infusion of the plant's bark or fruit has been useful in the treatment of bronchitis and dysenteric conditions, or as a mouthwash to treat toothaches. It has also been used as a medicine for biliousness and febrile pains. The bark, when steeped in palm wine, is used to treat asthma, stomach-aches and rheumatism. The plant's seeds are also used in the Nigerian traditional mixture Aju Mbaise.

In Senegal, the fruit is used to flavor café Touba, a coffee drink that is the country's spiritual beverage and the traditional drink of the Mouride brotherhood. In the Middle Ages the fruit was exported to Europe as a 'pepper.' In the eastern part of Nigeria, the plant's fruit is an essential ingredient in the preparation of local soups to aid new mothers in breastfeeding. It remains an important item of local trade throughout Africa as a spice, and flavouring for food and medicine. The fruit is sometimes put into jars of water for purification purposes.
