= Selim people =

Selim is an ethnic group of Sudan. They mostly speak Sudanese Arabic. Most members of the ethnic groups practice Islam and live in Umm Jalala area in the White Nile State.
