= Carlos Salem =

Argentine writer (born 1959)

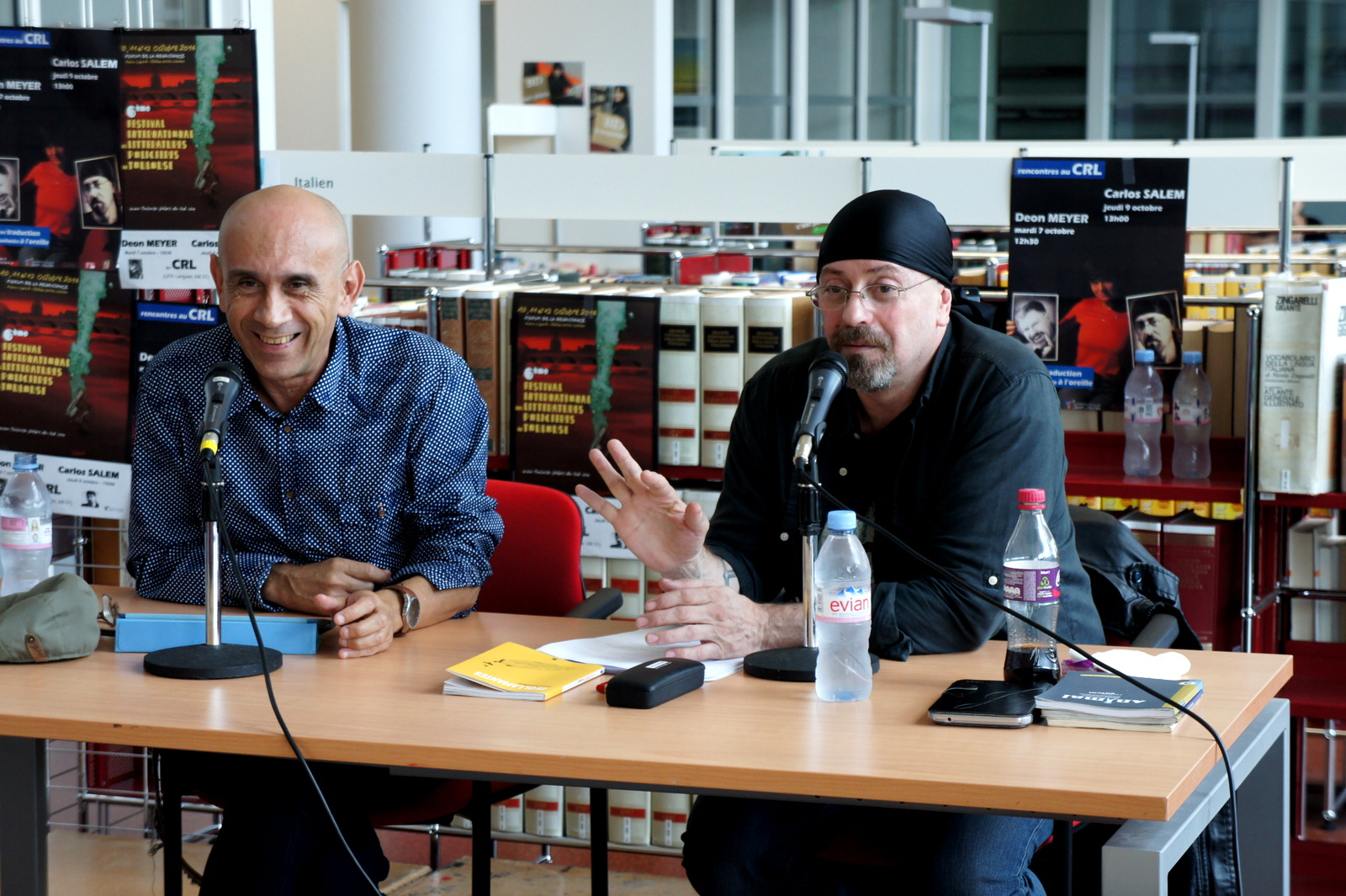
Carlos Salem - CRL - Université Toulouse - Jean Jaurès – Oct., 2014

Carlos Salem Sola (born 1959 in Buenos Aires) is an Argentinian writer. He has lived in Spain since 1988, where he has worked for publications such as El Faro de Ceuta , El Telegrama or El Faro de Melilla.

== Works ==
=== Novels ===
- Camino de ida (2007, Salto de Página)
- Matar y guardar la ropa (2008, Salto de Página)
- Pero sigo siendo el rey (2009, Salto de Página)
- Cracovia sin ti (2010, Imagine Ediciones)
- Un jamón calibre 45 (2011, RBA)
- El huevo izquierdo del talento (una novela de cerveza-ficción) (2013, ediciones Escalera)
- La maldición del tigre blanco (2013, Edebé)
- Muerto el perro (2014, Navona)

=== Tales ===
- Yo también puedo escribir una jodida historia de amor (2008, ediciones Escalera)
- Yo lloré con Terminator 2 (relatos de cerveza-ficción) (2009, ediciones Escalera)

=== Poetry ===
- Si dios me pide un bloody mary (2008, ed. Ya lo dijo Casimiro Parker)
- Orgía de andar por casa (2009, Albatros)
- Memorias circulares del hombre-peonza (2010, ed. Ya lo dijo Casimiro Parker)

== Theatre ==
- El torturador arrepentido (2011, Talentura)

== Prizes ==
- Memorial Silverio Cañada de la Semana Negra de Gijón
- Premio Novelpol a la mejor novela policial
- Premio internacional Seseña de Novela
