= Salim (name) =

- Gender: Male

Origin
- Origin: Arabic
- Meaning: Safe, sound, healthy, secure, intact

Salim (also spelled Saleem or Salem , ""Shalim" or Selim, Arabic: سليم, strictly transliterated as Salīm) is a name of Semitic origin from the root It derives from the Semitic tri-consonantal root s-l-m (س-ل-م) meaning "safe" "clean" or "undamaged".

Versions of the name appear in a number of Semitic languages such as Akkadian, Aramaic, Hebrew and Arabic, one of the earliest being Shalim-ahum from Bronze Age Assyria, another being Bab-shalimeti. Related names are Selima, Salima, Saleemah, Shalim and Salma.

When transliterated, the name Salem (Arabic: سالم) can become indistinguishable in English, as the spelling Salim is also used, though with a long a and a short i sounds. Salim is also an Indonesian-Chinese surname based on Lim. Notable people with the name include:

== Given name ==
=== Saleem ===
- Saleem (playwright), Palestinian-American gay Muslim playwright, actor, DJ, and dancer
- Saleem Abdulrauf, American physician
- Saleem Ahmed (born 1967), Indian politician
- Saleem Akhtar (1930–2004), Pakistani cricketer
- Saleem Ali (academic) (born 1973), Pakistani American Australian academic
- Saleem Ali (politician) (died 2007), Maldivian political prisoner
- Saleem Altaf (born 1944), Pakistani cricketer
- Saleem Arab (died 2026), Pakistani footballer
- Saleem Asmi (1934–2020), Pakistani journalist and editor
- Saleem Badar (born 1953), Pakistani cricket umpire
- Saleem Badat (born 1957), South African university leader, sociologist, higher education policy specialist and researcher
- Saleem Bibi Bharwana (born 1957), Pakistani politician
- Saleem Al-Basri (1926–1997), Iraqi actor and comedian
- Saleem Borhot (born 1985), Canadian footballer
- Saleem Burki (born 1991), Pakistani cricketer
- Saleem Elahi (born 1976), Pakistani cricketer
- Saleem Farook (1964–2000), Indian economist, tribal rights activist, and social worker
- Saleem Farooqi (born 1940), Pakistani cyclist
- Saleem Gillani (1928–2008), Pakistani broadcaster, poet, and media administrator
- Saleem Golam, British-Mauritian flat racing jockey
- Saleem Haddad (born 1983), Kuwait-born author and aid worker of Iraqi-German and Palestinian-Lebanese descent
- Saleem Jaffar (born 1962), Pakistani cricketer
- Saleem Raza Jalbani (born 1964), Pakistani politician
- Saleem Sarwar Jaura, Pakistani politician
- Saleem Karim (born 1965), Pakistani cricketer and a businessman
- Saleem Kausar (born 1947), Pakistani Urdu poet
- Saleem Khan (politician) (born 1968), Pakistani politician
- Saleem Khursheed Khokhar, Pakistani politician
- Saleem Kidwai (1951–2021), Indian historian, gay rights activist, and translator
- Saleem Kidwai (Muslim Council of Wales), Welsh accountant
- Saleem Malakh (born 1957), Iraqi footballer
- Saleem Malik (born 1963), Pakistani cricketer
- Saleem Mandviwalla (born 1959), Pakistani politician
- Saleem Marsoof, Sri Lankan judge and lawyer
- Saleem Mohammed (born 1968), English cricketer
- Saleem Mughal (born 1978), Pakistani cricketer
- Saleem Mukuddem (born 1972), South African-born Bermudian cricketer
- Saleem Nazim (1955–2025), Pakistani field hockey player
- Saleem Ullah Khan Niazi Paikhel (born 1970), Pakistani agriculturist and politician
- Saleem Pervez (1947–2013), Pakistani cricketer
- Saleem Rasheed (born 1981), American and Canadian football linebacker and free agent
- Saleem Raza (cricketer) (born 1964), Pakistani cricketer
- Saleem Raza (singer) (1932–1983), Pakistani playback singer
- Saleem Safi (born 1968), Pakistani journalist and talk show host
- Saleem Sarang (born 1977), Indian politician
- Saleem Shah (1931–1992), Indian-American psychologist
- Saleem Shahzad (1970–2011), Pakistani investigative journalist
- Saleem Shahzad (politician) (1958–2018), Pakistani politician
- Saleem Shehzad (born 1946), Pakistani film, television, and radio singer
- Saleem Sheikh (born 1967), Pakistani actor and producer
- Saleem Iqbal Shervani (born 1953), Indian politician
- Saleem Sherwani (field hockey forward) (born 1962), Pakistani field hockey player
- Saleem Sherwani (field hockey goalkeeper) (born 1951), Pakistani field hockey player
- Saleem Tahir, Pakistani cricketer
- Saleem Takla (1849–1892), Lebanese-Ottoman journalist
- Saleem Yousuf (born 1959), Pakistani cricketer
- Saleem Zia, Pakistani politician

=== Salim ===
- Salim (poet) (1800–1866), Kurdish poet
- Salim Abanoz (born 1969), Turkish judoka
- Salim Abdalla (born 1990), Kenyan footballer
- Salim Abduvaliev (born 1950), Uzbek businessman and film producer
- Salim Abes (born 1970), Algerian handball player
- Salim Abubakar (born 2003), Ghanaian footballer
- Salim Ahamed (born 1971), Indian film director, screen writer, and producer
- Salim Kouider-Aïssa (born 1996), Scottish footballer
- Salim Akil, American film and television producer, director, and screenwriter
- Salim Ali (1896–1987), Indian ornithologist
- Salim Ben Ali (1918–2002), Comorian politician
- Salim Rubaya Ali (1934–1978), Yemeni Maoist politician and revolutionary
- Salim ibn Abd Allah (died 728), Arab narrator of hadith
- Salim ibn Amr ibn Abd Allah (died 680), Arab companion of Husayn ibn Ali
- Salim Ansari (born 1962), Indian politician
- Salim Miya Ansari, Nepalese politician
- Salim Moazenzadeh Ardabili (1936–2016), Iranian maddah and muezzin
- Salim Aribi (born 1974), Algerian footballer
- Salim Arrache (born 1982), Algerian footballer
- Salim bin Nasser bin Said Al Aufi, Omani politician
- Salim Ayyash (1963–2024), Lebanese militant and senior Hezbollah military operative
- Salim Babu (born 1978), Kenyan footballer
- Salim Babullaoghlu (born 1972), Azerbaijani poet
- Salim Bachi (born 1971), Algerian novelist
- Salim Baig, Indian actor
- Salim Barakat (born 1951), Kurdish-Syrian novelist and poet
- Salim Barjum (born 1952), Colombian diver
- Salim Benali (born 1986), Algerian footballer
- Salim Benghalem (1980–2017), French jihadist and terrorist
- Salim Bhagalia (died 2012), South African cricketer of Indian descent
- Salim Bhuiyan, Bangladeshi politician
- Salim al-Bishri (1832–1916), Egyptian Sunni religious scholar
- Salim Ben Boina (born 1991), French-Comorian footballer
- Salim Boukhanchouche (born 1991), Algerian footballer
- Salim Boumechra (born 1983), Algerian footballer
- Salim Al Bustani (1848–1884), Lebanese journalist and writer
- Salim Chartouni (born 1973), Mexican footballer
- Salim Chishti (1478–1572), Indian Sufi saint
- Salim Cissé (born 1992), Guinean footballer
- Salim Çivitcioğlu (born 1970), Turkish politician
- Salim al-Dabbagh (1941–2022), Iraqi painter and installation artist
- Salim Dada (born 1975), Algerian composer, musician, and musicologist
- Salim Daw (born 1950), Palestinian Israeli actor
- Salim Diakité (born 2000), French-Malian footballer
- Salim Khan Shams al-Dinlu, Safavid military leader and official
- Salim Diwan (born 1985), Indian film actor and entrepreneur
- Salim Djefaflia (born 1978), French footballer
- Salim Durani (1934–2023), Indian cricketer
- Salim Essa (born 1978), South African businessman
- Salim Fergani (born 1953), Algerian oud player and singer
- Salim Gangadharan (born 1953), Indian banker
- Salim bin Ghabaisha (1930–2016), Emirati Bedouin guide
- Salim Ghazal (1931–2011), Lebanese bishop
- Salim Ghouse (1952–2022), Indian actor, theater director and martial artist
- Salim Grant (born 1977), film, voice and mascot actor
- Salim Haidar (1911–1980), Lebanese politician
- Salim Haim (1919–1983), Iraqi dermatologist
- Salim Halali (1920–2005), Algerian singer
- Salim Hamdan (born 1968), convicted terrorist of Yemeni descent detained Guantanamo Bay Camp
- Salim Ben Hamidane (born 1969), Tunisian politician
- Salim Hanifi (born 1988), Algerian footballer
- Salim Hanna (born 2009), Colombian racing driver
- Salim Hassan, Indian actor
- Salim Al-Hassani, British-Iraqi academic
- Salim Hatum (1928–1967), Syrian military officer and politician
- Salim Hernández (born 1998), Mexican footballer
- Salim Heroui (born 1999), Algerian fencer
- Salim al-Husayni (died 1908), Palestinian politician
- Salim Al-Huss (1929–2024), Lebanese politician
- Salim Aliyow Ibrow (born 1942), Somali politician
- Salim Idris (born 1958), Syrian military officer and former rebel leader
- Salim Iles (born 1975), Algerian swimmer
- Salim Ismail (born 1965), Indo-Canadian serial entrepreneur, angel investor, author, speaker, and technology strategist
- Salim al-Jabouri (born 1971), Iraqi politician
- Salim Nuruddin Jahangir (1569–1627), Mughal emperor, also known as Prince Salim
- Salim Jay (born 1951), Franco-Moroccan novelist, essayist, and literary critic
- Salim El Jebari (born 2004), Spanish-Moroccan footballer
- Salim Jemai (born 2005), French-Tunisian slalom canoeist
- Salim Joubran (1947–2024), Israeli judge
- Salim Jreissati (born 1952), Lebanese jurist and politician
- Salim Al-Kadi, Lebanese architect and designer
- Salim Kallas (1936−2013), Syrian actor
- Salim Kara (born 1949), Indian-Tanzanian Canadian inventor
- Salim Karam (born 1946), Lebanese politician
- Salim Abdool Karim (born 1960), South African public health physician, epidemiologist, and virologist
- Salim Kechiouche (born 1979), French actor
- Salim Keddar (born 1993), Algerian middle-distance runner
- Salim Kerkar (born 1987), French-Algerian footballer
- Salim Abdallah Khalfan (born 1961), Tanzanian politician
- Salim Khamis (1951–2013), Tanzanian politician
- Salim Khan (born 1935), Indian scriptwriter
- Salim Khan (Shaki khan) (died 1826), khan of Shaki
- Salim Saifullah Khan (born 1947), Pakistani politician
- Salim Khatri (1965–2023), Pakistani Islamic scholar and a political religious leader
- Salim Al-Khebari (born 1991), Saudi Arabian footballer
- Salim Khelifi (born 1994), Swiss-Tunisian footballer
- Salim Kipkemboi (born 1998), Kenyan cyclist
- Salim Kipsang (born 1979), Kenyan long-distance runner
- Salim Kumar (1969–2026), Indian actor, director, and writer
- Salim al-Kuwari (born 1978), Qatari terrorist financier
- Salim Lahoud (1910–1971), Lebanese politician
- Salim Fago Lawal (born 2003), Nigerian footballer
- Salim Lawzi (1922–1980), Lebanese journalist and publisher
- Salim L. Lewis (1908–1978), American businessman
- Salim Lone (born 1943), Kenyan journalist
- Salim Ahmed bin Mahfouz (1910–1994), Saudi businessman
- Salim Mahmood, Malaysian politician
- Salim Mahmud (born 1971), Bangladeshi politician
- Salim Mahsas (born 1991), Algerian footballer
- Salim Al Mamari (born 1999), Omani footballer
- Salim Mansur, Indian academic
- Salim ibn Ma'qil, Persian companion of the prophet Muhammad
- Salim Maush (born 1948), Lebanese critic, researcher, and academic
- Salim Abu Mayanja (born 1995), Ugandan runner
- Salim Jan Khan Mazari (born 1940), Pakistani politician
- Salim Medjkoune (born 1972), French boxer
- Salim Mehajer (born 1986), Lebanese-Australian convicted criminal and former politician
- Salim Mehmud, Pakistani rocket scientist and nuclear engineer
- Salim Sayyid Mengga (1951–2026), Indonesian army officer and politician
- Salim Mohammed (born 1946), Trinidadian cyclist
- Salim Moin (1961–2020), football coach
- Salim Moizini (born 1985), French-Comorian footballer
- Salim al-Moubayed (1943–2024), Palestinian writer and historian
- Salim Mramboini (born 1984), French-Comorian footballer
- Salim Musah (born 2006), German footballer
- Salim Muslumov (born 1961), Azerbaijani politician
- Salim ibn Mustafad (died 1034), army commander in the Mirdasid emirate
- Salim Muwakkil (born 1947), American journalist and political commentator
- Salim Mvurya (born 1970), Kenyan politician
- Salim Nasir (1944–1989), Pakistani film and TV actor
- Salim Nedjel (born 1972), Algerian handball player
- Salim Neisari (1920–2019), Iranian professor of Persian literature
- Salim Nourallah (born 1967), American singer, songwriter, and producer
- Salim Abd an-Nur, Lebanese politician
- Salim Obaid (born 1992), Jordanian footballer
- Salim Osman (born 1958), Bangladeshi politician
- Salim bin Sultan Al Qasimi (died 1919), Emirati ruler
- Salim Qub'ayn (1870–1951), Palestinian teacher, journalist, writer, historian, and translator
- Salim Rabahi (born 1996), Algerian judoka
- Salim Raj, Indian politician
- Salim ibn Asad ibn Abi Rashid (did 939), governor of Sicily for the Fatimid Caliphate
- Salim Rehman (born 1967), Pakistani politician
- Salim Saadeh (born 1949), Lebanese politician
- Salim Saadi (1936–2023), Algerian politician and soldier
- Salim Al-Mubarak Al-Sabah (1864–1921), Kuwaiti ruler
- Salim Ghazi Saeedi (born 1981), Iranian composer and guitarist
- Salim Haji Said (1943–2024), Indonesian writer and journalist
- Salim Ali Salam (1868–1938), Lebanese politician
- Salim Saleh (born 1960), Ugandan military officer
- Salim Ahmed Salim (born 1942), Tanzanian diplomat
- Salim Salimov (boxer) (1982–2025), Bulgarian Olympic boxer
- Salim Salimov (politician) (1941–2024), Azerbaijani politician
- Salim Sayegh, Lebanese academic and politician
- Salim Sayegh (Catholic bishop) (born 1935), Jordanian Catholic prelate
- Salim Sdiri (born 1978), French long jumper of Tunisian descent
- Salim Ben Seghir (born 2003), French footballer
- Salim Sfeir, Lebanese–Swiss banker and financier
- Salim Shahed (born 1970), Bangladeshi cricket referee and former cricketer
- Salim Shaheen (born 1957), Afghan actor, producer, and filmmaker
- Salim Sharif (born 1966), Malaysian politician
- Salim al-Shimiri, Iraqi fashion designer
- Salim Stoudamire (born 1982), American basketball player
- Salim bin Sultan (died 1821), Sultan of Oman
- Salim Rashid Suri (died 1979), Omani ṣawt singer and oud player
- Salim Tamari (born 1945), Palestinian sociologist
- Salim ibn Sawadah al-Tamimi, governor of Egypt for the Abbasid Caliphate
- Salim Uddin Tarafder (born 1968), Bangladeshi politician
- Salim Tebani (born 1978), French-Algerian rugby union player
- Salim bin Thuwaini (1839–1876), Sultan of Muscat and Oman
- Salim Touahri (born 1989), Polish mixed martial artist
- Salim Tuama (born 1979), Arab Israeli soccer player
- Salim Tuharea (born 2004), Indonesian footballer
- Salim Turky (1963–2020), Tanzanian politician
- Salim Uddin (born 1960), Bangladeshi politician
- Salim Veragi (born 1986), Indian cricketer
- Salim Wardeh (born 1968), Lebanese politician
- Salim Yasin (1937–2016), Syrian politician
- Salim Yussif (born 2002), Ghanaian footballer
- Salim Yusuf (born 1952), Indian-born Canadian physician
- Salim al-Za'nun (1933–2022), Palestinian politician

=== Selim ===
- Selim I (1465–1520), Ottoman sultan
- Selim II (1524–1574), Ottoman sultan
- Selim III (1761–1808), Ottoman sultan
- Selim I Giray (1631–1704), Crimean khan
- Selim Aga (1826–1875), Sudanese slave
- Selim Al Deen (1949–2008), Bangladeshi playwright and theatre artist
- Selim Benachour (born 1981), Tunisian football player
- Selim Bouadla (born 1988), French-Algerian football player
- Selim Deringil (born 1951), Turkish academic
- Selim Ekbom (1807–1886), Finnish politician
- Selim Franklin (1814–1884), American pioneer
- Selim Giray (born 1970), Turkish-born American violinist
- Selim Gökdemir (born 1960), Turkish businessman
- Selim Hassan (1887–1961), Egyptian Egyptologist
- Selim Lemström (1838–1903), Finnish scientist
- Selim Mouzannar (born 1963), Lebanese jeweler and civic activist
- Selim Palmgren (1878–1951), Finnish composer, pianist, conductor
- Selim Sadak (1954–2026), Turkish Kurdish politician
- Selim Sahab (born 1941), Egyptian musician
- Selim Sarper (1899–1968), Turkish diplomat and politician
- Selim Sesler (1957–2014), Turkish clarinet virtuoso of Romani heritage
- Selim Soydan (1941–2016), Turkish footballer
- Selim Sırrı Tarcan (1874–1957), Turkish educator, sports official and politician
- Selim E. Woodworth (1815–1871), American Navy officer

== Surname ==
- Abdel Gadir Salim (1946–2025), Sudanese singer and bandleader
- Abubakar Salim (born 1993), British actor
- Ahmed Salim (1989–2024), Bangladeshi painter and convicted murderer hanged in Singapore
- Ali Saleem (born 1979), Pakistani television host
- Ali Selim (born 1960/61), American film director
- Aliyah Saleem (born 1989), British ex-Muslim and human rights activist
- Ezzedine Salim (1943–2004), Iraqi politician
- Huner Saleem (born 1964), Iraqi-Kurdish film director
- Mai Selim (born 1983), Jordanian singer
- Malek Saleem (born 1985), Qatari professional basketball player
- Mohammed Ali Salim (1934/35–2022), Libyan politician
- Naziha Salim (1927–2008), Iraqi artist
- Noor Askuzaimey Mat Salim (born 1985), Malaysian boccia player
- Saleh Saleem (born 1953), Israeli politician
- Saleh Selim (1930–2002), Egyptian footballer and actor
- Shakir Mustafa Salim (1919–1985), Iraqi anthropologist
- Sudono Salim (1916–2012) Chinese Indonesian businessman
- Zaki Selim (1926–1979), Jewish Egyptian Olympic basketball player

== See also ==
- Salem (name)
- Salim (disambiguation)
- Saleem Ali (disambiguation)
