= Selma (given name) =

- Gender: Feminine

Origin
- Languages: Semitic; also Celtic?
- Meaning: "Peaceful"

Other names
- Variant forms: Salima, Salimah, Selima, Salma, Zelma
- Related names: Salim, Selim

Selma is a feminine name of ambiguous origin. It could be a form of Selima, which in turn is a name first recorded in a poem by Thomas Gray (died 1771). One possibility is that Selima was influenced by the Arabic name Selim meaning "peaceful". In Turkey, the name is a variation of the Arabic female name Salma. There may also be a homonymous name with Celtic origins, in which case it means "beautiful view".

The use of Selma in Germany and Scandinavia stems from the Ossianic poetry of James Macpherson (died 1796), where it appears as a place name. Its specific popularity in Sweden is likely due to the Selma poems of Frans Michael Franzén (died 1847). It was later introduced into Denmark by Swedish immigrants, after which it likely became more common due to the works of the author Selma Lagerlöf (died 1940). The given name lost popularity in Sweden during most of the 20th century, but has had an upswing since the 1990s. In 1999, it joined the list of 100 most common names for Swedish female infants, and in 2017 and 2018, it was in the 16th place.

== Given name ==
- Selma Bajrami (born 1980), Bosnian singer
- Selma Björnsdóttir (born 1974), Icelandic singer, 1999 and 2005 representative in the Eurovision Song Contest
- Selma Blair (born 1972), American actress
- Selma Botman (born 1950), American academic
- Selma Calmes (born 1940), anesthesiologist
- Selma Chalabi, British filmmaker
- Selma Cronan (1913–2002), American aviator
- Selma Diamond (1917–2008), American actress
- Selma Dritz (1920–1985), American physician and epidemiologist
- Selma D'Silva (born 1960), hockey player
- Selma Ek (1856–1941), Swedish opera singer
- Selma Engel-Wijnberg (1922–2018), Holocaust survivor
- Selma Ergeç (born 1978), Turkish-German actress and model
- Selma Freud (1877–?), Austrian physicist
- Selma Giöbel (1843–1925), Swedish artist
- Selma Gräfin von der Gröben (1856–1938), German women's rights activist
- Selma Hanımsultan (1916–1942), Ottoman princess
- Salma Hayek (born 1966), Mexican and American actress and producer
- Selma Jacobsson (1841–1899), Swedish photographer
- Selma James (born 1930), American writer, feminist and social activist
- Selma Aliye Kavaf (born 1962), Turkish politician
- Selma Kurz (1874–1933), Austrian operatic soprano
- Selma Lagerlöf (1858–1940), Swedish author
- Selma Lohse (1883–1937), German politician
- Selma Mayer (1884–1984), Israeli nurse known as Schwester Selma
- Selma Meerbaum-Eisinger (1924–1942), Romanian-born German-language poet
- Selma Meyer (1890–1941), Dutch-Jewish women's rights activist
- Selma Muhedinović (born 1972), Bosnian singer
- Selma van de Perre (1922–2025), Dutch–British resistance fighter
- Selma Rainio (1873–1939), Finnish medical missionary
- Selma Skenderović (born 2001), Slovene writer and poet
- Selma Stern (1890–1981), German historian
- Selma Vilhunen (born 1976), Finnish film maker
- Selma Walker (1925–1997), American social worker
- Selma Yağcı (born 1981), Turkish boxer
- Selma Yildirim (born 1969), Austrian politician

== Fictional characters ==
- Selma Bouvier, The Simpsons character voiced by Julie Kavner
- Selma Jezková, fictional character in the Lars von Trier film Dancer in the Dark played by Björk
- Selma Ann Forrester, nicknamed Selmers, from the video game Night in the Woods

== Citations ==
=== Sources ===
- Fellows-Jensen, G (2001). "Danish Place-names in Scotland and Scottish Personal Names in Denmark: A Survey of Recent Research". In Fellows-Jensen, G (ed.). Denmark and Scotland: The Cultural and Environmental Resources of Small Nations. Historisk-filosofiske Meddelelser (series vol. 82). Copenhagen: Det Kongelige Danske Videnskabernes Selskab. ISBN 87-7876-229-4. ISSN 0106-0481.
- Hanks, P; Hardcastle, K; Hodges, F (2006) [1990]. A Dictionary of First Names. Oxford Paperback Reference (2nd ed.). Oxford: Oxford University Press. ISBN 978-0-19-861060-1.
- Vigsø, O (2005). "168: The Language of 19th Century Translations II: Danish". In Bandle, O; Braunmüller, K; Jahr, EH; Karker, A; Naumann, H-P; Teleman, U; Elmevik, L; Widmark, G (eds.). The Nordic Languages: An International Handbook of the History of the North Germanic Languages. Handbücher zur Sprach- und Kommunikationswissenschaft (series vol. 22). Vol. 2. Berlin: Walter de Gruyter. pp. 1513–1514. ISBN 3-11-017149-X.
