= Saleem Ali =

Saleem or Salim Ali may refer to:

- Saleem Ali (politician) (died 2007), Maldivian politician
- Saleem Ali (academic) (born 1973), American academic of Pakistani origin
- Salim Ali (1896–1987), Indian ornithologist, author and conservationist
- Salim Rubai Ali (1935–1978), second President of the People's Democratic Republic of Yemen
