= Hareb =

Hareb is a surname. Notable people with the surname include:

- Paige Hareb (born 1990), New Zealand surfer
- Salma Hareb (born 1965), Emirati business executive
