= Mabizela =

Mabizela is a surname. Notable people with the surname include:

- Mbulelo Mabizela (born 1980), South African footballer
- Sizwe Mabizela, South African academic
