= B. V. Bowden, Baron Bowden =

British scientist and educationist (1910–1989)

The Right Honourable The Lord Bowden

Minister of State for Education and Science
- In office 19 October 1964 – 11 October 1965
- Monarch: Elizabeth II
- Prime Minister: Harold Wilson
- Preceded by: The Lord Newton
- Succeeded by: Edward Redhead

Member of the House of Lords Lord Temporal
- In office 18 January 1964 – 28 July 1989; Life Peerage

Personal details
- Born: 18 January 1910
- Died: 28 July 1989 (aged 79)
- Party: Labour
- Children: 3
- Education: Emmanuel College, Cambridge

Bertram Vivian Bowden, Baron Bowden (/ˈboʊdən/; 18 January 1910 – 28 July 1989) was an English scientist and educationist, particularly associated with the development of UMIST as a successful university.

== Life ==
Born, Chesterfield, Derbyshire, he attended Hasland Junior School and Chesterfield Grammar School as a child and graduated in natural sciences from Emmanuel College, Cambridge in 1931, taking his PhD in nuclear physics while working at Cavendish Laboratory under Ernest Rutherford. From 1934 to 1935 he was sponsored by ICI to undertake research at the University of Amsterdam.

After a period in teaching, in 1940 he was conscripted to the Telecommunications Research Establishment to work on radar, including an improved system to distinguish between friend and foe. From 1943, he continued his work at the U.S. Naval Research Laboratory, establishing himself as an able and effective administrator. From the end of World War II to 1953 he held a series of jobs, including selling early computers manufactured by Ferranti. His prescient forecasts of the impact that the technology would have on daily life were published in his 1953 book Faster than Thought.

In 1953, Bowden became principal of the Manchester College of Science and Technology, a vocational education college in Manchester. The post-war expansion in university education in Britain, coupled with Bowden's energy, creativity and lobbying soon entailed the college's transformation into UMIST (University of Manchester Institute of Science and Technology).

On 18 January 1964, he was created a life peer as Baron Bowden, of Chesterfield in the County of Derby and later in this year, Harold Wilson appointed him Minister for Education and Science. However, Westminster and the labyrinths of the civil service were ill-matched to Bowden's direct approach and, in 1965 he returned to UMIST. He retired in 1976.

Lord Bowden helped Richard L. Hills preserve the archives of locomotive manufacturer Beyer, Peacock & Company.

Bowden was married four times and had three children. He died in Bowdon, Cheshire.

== Islamic finance ==
Bowden was interested in Islamic finance and economics, enough to suggest an Institute for the History of Islamic Science and Commerce, though this never materialised. His interest in the subject continued and he once mentioned the subject at length in the House of Lords. His interest in the subject was spurred by his colleague Salim Al-Hassani.

== Honours ==
- Elected membership of the Manchester Literary and Philosophical Society (1955)
- Distinguished Fellow of the British Computer Society (1976)
- Honorary Fellow of the Institution of Civil Engineers (1975);
- Pioneer Award of the Institute of Electrical and Electronics Engineers (1973).

== Bibliography ==
- Bowden, B.V., ed. (1953). Faster than Thought: A Symposium on Digital Computing Machines. London: Pitman. OCLC 1053355. OL 13581728M.
- Papers of Lord Bowden at the University of Manchester Library.
- Entwistle, K.M. (2004) "(Bertram) Vivian, Baron Bowden (1910-1989)", rev., Oxford Dictionary of National Biography, Oxford University Press, accessed 17 June 2005 (subscription, Wikipedia Library access or UK public library membership required)
- FTSC (2006). "Lord Vivian Bowden on Muslim Heritage in Economics and Fiscal System". MuslimHeritage.com. Foundation for Science Technology and Civilisation.
- Bowden 1975, "Effects of World War II on education in science"

Professional and academic associations
Preceded by Sir Charles Frederick Carter	President of the Manchester Statistical Society; 1969–71	Succeeded by Alfred C. Wild
