= Institute for Environmental Diplomacy and Security =

Research center at the University of Vermont

The Institute for Environmental Diplomacy and Security(IEDS) is a transdisciplinary research center, based at the University of Vermont (UVM), aimed at the study and practice of techniques that resolve destructive environmental conflicts, and to using ecological processes as tools of peace-building. IEDs was founded under the auspices of the James M. Jeffords Center at UVM in 2010, which is named in honor of former US Senator Jim Jeffords. The founding director of the Institute was Professor Saleem Ali, who is now a member of the United Nations International Resource Panel and the Scientific and Technical Advisory Panel of the Global Environment Facility

== Mission and programs ==
IEDS operates within a framework of 3 broad themes that capture its mission and vision:

- Borderlands: Boundaries in physical and cognitive space can be defining themes of diplomacy. IEDS explores how human territoriality can be constructively configured so geopolitical boundaries work within ecological principles.
- Resource Values: Natural resources have values in both economic and ecological terms, and often a disjuncture in these values leads to conflict. IEDS works to find effective mechanisms for ascribing, communicating, and implementing values that minimize conflict.
- Pragmatic Peace: Public policy has often been polarized between "hawks" and "doves", with each side dismissing the other's motives and methods. IEDS works to reconcile these differences by promoting a practically implementable vision of peace.

Within this framework IEDS has operationalized four major program areas:

- Experiential Learning: Online and field oriented programs for conventional students and mid-career professionals
- Measured Mediation: Providing mediation services with latest technical tools and measuring indicators of success
- Participatory Action Research: Conducting empirical research that is calibrated to community needs
- Clinical Case Compendia: Documenting diplomatic processes that lead to conflict resolution while providing security

Current funding support for IEDS comes from governmental and private grants. Training programs in environmental diplomacy and security as well as targeted mediation services are also planned as revenue sources for operations.
