= Nasir Ali (footballer) =

Pakistani footballer (born 1968)

Personal information
- Full name: Syed Nasir Ali
- Date of birth: 12 October 1968
- Place of birth: Karachi, Pakistan
- Height: 1.76 m (5 ft 9 in)
- Position: Midfielder

Senior career*
Years	Team	Apps	(Gls)
1990	Pakistan Police		
1991–1995	National Bank		

International career
1995–2000	Pakistan	5	(0)
- * Club domestic league appearances and goals

Nasir Ali (Urdu: سید ناصر علی; born 1968) is a former Pakistani footballer who played as a midfielder for the Pakistan national team in the 1990s.

== Club career ==
Ali began his career with Pakistan Police before moving to National Bank. In 1993, he played a key role in helping the club win the National B-Division Football Championship, securing promotion to the National A-Division Football Championship.

== International career ==
Ali was selected to represent Pakistan at the 1995 SAFF Gold Cup by coach Tariq Lutfi. He would also go on to represent Pakistan at the 2000 AFC Asian Cup qualification, where he would play against teams like Qatar, Palestine, Jordan, Kazakhstan.

== Post-retirement ==
After obtaining his AFC C coaching license, Ali would go on to coach the Diya Football Club for the National Women’s Football Championship held in Islamabad.

== Honours ==
=== National Bank ===
- National B-Division Football Championship
  - Winners (1): 1993
