= Zahir Ahmed =

Pakistani footballer (born 1968)

Personal information
- Full name: Rana Zahir Ahmed
- Date of birth: 2 April 1968 (age 58)
- Place of birth: Faisalabad, Pakistan
- Position: Forward

Senior career*
Years	Team	Apps	(Gls)
1988–1989	Crescent Textile Mills		
1990–2006	Pakistan Navy		

International career
1991–1997	Pakistan	17	(0)
Medal record
Men's football
Representing Pakistan
South Asian Games
Gold medal – first place	1991 Colombo	Team competition
- * Club domestic league appearances and goals

Rana Zahir Ahmed (Urdu: رانا ظہیر احمد; born 2 April 1968), also known by nickname Jara, is a Pakistani former footballer who played as a forward. Ahmed played and captained Pakistan Navy for most of his career, and was part of the Pakistan national team which won the 1991 South Asian Games.

== Club career ==
Zahir was part of the Faisalabad based club Crescent Textile Mills which participated in the 1988–89 Asian Club Championship. He later played for Pakistan Navy, where he spent most of his career and served as captain.

== International career ==
He made his international debut in the 1991 South Asian Games in Colombo under the captainship of Ghulam Sarwar. He featured in the final against Maldives, which ended in a 2–0 victory for Pakistan. He later featured in several matches as starter including 1992 AFC Asian Cup qualification, 1994 FIFA World Cup qualification, 1995 SAARC Gold Cup, and the 1998 FIFA World Cup qualification in 1997.

== Post-retirement ==
After his retirement as player, Zahir undertook several trainings to obtain a coaching license.

== Honours ==
=== Pakistan ===
- South Asian Games:
  - Winners (1): 1991
