= 2007 Karsaz bombing =

2007 terror attack in Karachi, Pakistan

Coordinates: 24.884733°N 67.089638°E

- Location: Karachi, Pakistan
- Date: 18 October 2007
- Target: Benazir Bhutto and her supporters
- Attack type: Suicide attack, bomb
- Deaths: 180
- Injuries: 500

A bombing attack on a motorcade carrying former Prime Minister Benazir Bhutto occurred on 18 October 2007 in Karachi, Pakistan. The bombing occurred two months before she was assassinated.

== The bombing ==
The streets of Karachi ground to a halt to welcome the return of Benazir Bhutto, after an eight-year self-imposed exile during which she lived in Dubai and London. Two explosions occurred in front of the rallying truck from which she greeted her supporters and party members at approximately 00:52 PKT, on the route about halfway from the airport to the tomb of Muhammad Ali Jinnah for a scheduled rally, just after Bhutto's truck had crossed a bridge. Police vehicles bore the brunt of the blasts, which completely destroyed three police vans and killed at least 20 policemen in the vehicles. Conflicting reports indicate that Bhutto, who was not injured in the attack, was either sitting on top of the truck or had just climbed into the compartment of the truck at the time of the explosion.

Bhutto was escorted to her residence, Bilawal House. The victims were rushed to Jinnah Hospital, Liaquat National Hospital, Civil Hospital and Abbasi Shaheed Hospital. In a press conference on 19 October 2007, Bhutto said that her security team were unable to prevent the attack because of the streetlights being turned off, and called for an inquiry into why this happened.

On 20 October, authorities released a photograph of the suspect responsible for the suicide attack. On 23 October, Pakistani Prime Minister Shaukat Aziz rejected Pakistan Peoples Party's demand for a probe into the suicide blast by foreign experts, expressing confidence that Pakistani law-enforcement agencies could probe in a very objective manner.

In the immediate aftermath of the attempt on her life, Bhutto wrote a letter to General Pervez Musharraf naming four persons whom she suspected of engineering the attacks. Careful not to name Musharraf himself, she chose to name senior military officials and politicians in Musharraf's regime instead, including Chaudhry Pervaiz Elahi, a rival PML-Q politician and the then chief minister of the province of Punjab, Hamid Gul, former director of the Inter-Services Intelligence agency, and Ijaz Shah, director general of the Intelligence Bureau, another premier military intelligence agency on Pakistan. Musharraf's regime blamed terrorist organisations such as Al-Qaeda and elements of the Taliban in Pakistan instead.

Al-Qaeda's chief of operations for Pakistan, Fahid Mohammed Ally Msalam, was believed to be behind the attack. He was killed in a drone strike in Pakistan along with his lieutenant, Sheikh Ahmed Salim Swedan, on 1 January 2009.

Tehrik-i-Taliban Pakistan leader Baitullah Mehsud was also implicated in the attack. He was killed in a drone strike in Pakistan in August 2009.

== Victims ==
The bombing resulted in at least 180 deaths and 500 injuries. Most of the dead were members of the Pakistan Peoples Party (PPP). Former Pakistan national football team player Abdul Khaliq was also among the deceased.

== Reaction ==
=== Pakistan ===
- President Pervez Musharraf called the attacks a "conspiracy against democracy".
- Benazir Bhutto: "It is dignitaries of the former regime of General Zia who are today behind the extremism and the fanaticism."
- Asif Ali Zardari, Benazir Bhutto's husband: "I blame the government for these blasts. It is the work of the intelligence agencies."
- Fatima Bhutto, Benazir Bhutto's niece: "She insisted on this grand show, she bears a responsibility for these deaths and for these injuries."

=== Other countries ===
- Australia: Prime Minister John Howard said "It's too early to be certain but it looks very much like the work of al-Qaeda. Benazir Bhutto, to her credit, as well as General Musharraf, have both said they will continue to support the Americans in the War on Terrorism," he said. "It is a reminder of the evil of al-Qaeda. It is a reminder of how important it is not to concede a victory to them in Iraq or in Afghanistan.
- Canada: Maxime Bernier, minister of foreign affairs, said the bombings were "an appalling act of violence", and urged "all parties in Pakistan to adhere to the rule of law and to continue to build the conditions for free and fair parliamentary elections"
- France: President Nicolas Sarkozy "condemned the attack which targeted Benazir Bhutto and which left numerous victims. He sent France's condolences and his sympathy to the president and to the political authorities in Pakistan as well as to the families of the victims."
- India: Manmohan Singh, the Prime Minister of India strongly condemned the assassination attempt on Bhutto and conveyed his condolences on the involved loss of life. While Singh's separate letters to Bhutto and Pervez Musharraf condemned "terrorism and extremism in all its forms", the leader of the opposition in the Lok Sabha, Lal Kishan Advani, rang up Bhutto to personally express his solidarity with her. India's foreign ministry spokesman expressed outrage and anger felt in the country.
- United Kingdom:
  - Prime Minister Gordon Brown, said "I was deeply shocked to learn of the bomb blasts in Karachi that have killed over a hundred people and injured so many others. I am appalled by this horrific use of violence against entirely innocent people...On behalf of the British Government please accept my sincerest condolences for those Pakistanis who have lost their lives. You can be assured of the United Kingdom's continuing support to work with all those committed to building a peaceful and democratic Pakistan"
  - Secretary of State for Foreign and Commonwealth Affairs David Miliband, said "I condemn utterly the use of violence against entirely innocent people and the attempt to suppress the right of Pakistanis to express their democratic voice. I share the shock of the Pakistani community in the United Kingdom at these horrific attacks".
- United States:
  - U.S. Department of State spokesperson Tom Casey: "There is no political cause that can justify the murder of innocent people. Those responsible seek only to foster fear and limit freedom. The United States stands with the people of Pakistan to eliminate terrorist threats, and to build a more open, democratic, and peaceful society."
  - U.S. National Security Council spokesman Gordon Johndroe stated that "The United States condemns the violent attack in Pakistan and mourns the loss of innocent life there. Extremists will not be allowed to stop Pakistanis from selecting their representatives through an open and democratic process."

=== International organisations ===
- Commonwealth of Nations: Secretary-General Don McKinnon condemned the attack, stating "The legitimate aspirations of the people of Pakistan to enjoy peace, stability, prosperity and a democratic way of life must not be allowed to be thwarted by senseless acts of violence".
- United Nations: A statement issued by a spokesperson for Secretary-General Ban Ki-moon read, "(Ban Ki-moon) strongly condemns this terrorist attack and expresses condolences to the families of the victims. He trusts that all political forces will act together to strengthen national unity."

== See also ==
- Terrorism in Pakistan
- 2007 Pakistani presidential election
- 2008 Pakistani general election
- Assassination of Benazir Bhutto
