= Tanzanian Constitutional Review Commission =

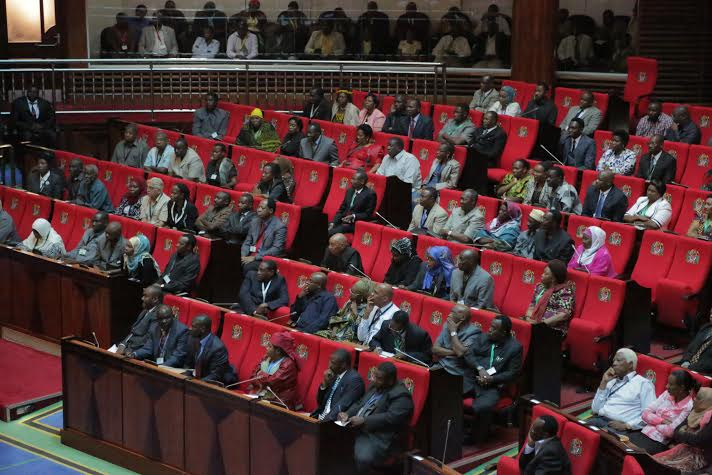
A cross section of the members of the Constituent Assembly

The Tanzanian Constitutional Review Commission is the national commission established as per the Constitutional Review Act of 2011 for the collection of public opinion on the review of the Constitution of Tanzania and its validation via a referendum. Key aspects of the review were legal frameworks for the state of the union, the presidency and the contentious aspect of human rights, which were included in an amendment after public protests. On 6 April 2012 President Jakaya Kikwete appointed the former Attorney General and Prime Minister Joseph Warioba as its chairman and the former Chief Justice Augustino Ramadhani as its vice chairman. The Commission was expected to complete its task by October 2013, with an estimated cost of TSh 40 billion during the 2012/13 fiscal year.

The commission collected views from citizens of different regions within the country and prepared two constitutional drafts for discussion and vote by the National constituent assembly. The assembly was divided on the core issues of the union framework and Zanzibar autonomy. After missing the deadline and the extension, the process was stalled by the walkout of the Ukawa party from the constituent assembly and also the Government of National Unity (GNU) in 2015. The process was expected to restart after the elections of 2020 but the ruling Chama Cha Mapinduzi party (CCM) has not committed to a constitutional amendment so far.

== Members ==
Members from Mainland Tanzania	Members from Zanzibar
Prof. Mwesiga Baregu	Dr Salim Ahmed Salim
Riziki Shahari Mngwali	Fatma Said Ali
Dr Edmund Sengondo Mvungi	Omar Sheha Mussa
Richard Shadrack Lyimo	Raya Salim Hamad
John Nkolo	Awadh Ali Said
Alhaj Said Hamad El-Maamry	Ussi Khamis Haji
Jesca Mkuchu	Salma Maoulidi
Prof. Palamagamba Kabudi	Nassor Khamis Mohamed
Humphrey Polepole	Simai Mohamed Said
Yahya Msulwa	Mohamed Yusuph Mshamba
Esther Mkwizu	Kibibi Mwinyi Hassan
Maria Malingumu Kashonda	Suleiman Omar Ali
Al-Shaymaa Kwegyir	Salama Kombo Ahmed
Mwantumu Malale	Abubakar Mohamed Ali
Joseph Butiku	Ally Abdullah Ally Saleh
