= Salma (given name) =

Salma is an Arabic feminine name that means "peace.” It comes from the Arabic word Salam.

People so named include:

- Salama (writer), (born 1968), Indian Tamil writer, activist, and politician
- Salma Agha (born 1954), British singer and actress
- Salma Akhter (born 1991), Bangladeshi folk singer
- Salma Amani (born 1989), Moroccan professional footballer
- Salma bint Amr, great-grandmother of the Islamic prophet Muhammad
- Salma Arastu (born 1950), Indian artist
- Salma Ataullahjan (born 1952), Canadian politician
- Salma bint Umays (fl. 7th century), a sahaba of the prophet Muhammad
- Salma Bennani (born 1978), birth name of Princess Lalla Salma of Morocco, queen consort of Morocco
- Salma Samar Damluji (born 1954), Iraqi British architect
- Salma Abu Deif (born 1993), Egyptian actress and fashion model
- Salma Djoubri (born 2002), French tennis player
- Salma Ghazal (born 1998), American-born Jordanian footballer
- Salma Hage (born 1942), Lebanese author and cook
- Salma Hale (1787–1866), American politician
- Salma Hany Ibrahim Ahmed (born 1996), Egyptian squash player
- Salma Hareb (born 1965), Emirati chief executive officer
- Salma Hassan (born 1975), Pakistani actress
- Salma Hayek (born 1966), Mexican-born American actress
- Salma Hindy, Canadian stand-up comedian
- Salma Islam (born 1955), Bangladeshi lawyer, journalist, and politician
- Salma Ismail (1918–2014), Malaysian medical doctor and the first Malaysian Malay woman to qualify as a doctor
- Salma Jahani (born 1952), Afghan singer, sister of Haidar Salim
- Salma Khadra Jayyusi (1925–2023), Palestinian writer
- Salma Khatun (born 1990), Bangladeshi cricketer
- Salma Khatun, first female train driver of Bangladesh
- Salma Kikwete (born 1963), Tanzanian first lady
- Salma Kuzbari (1923–2006), Syrian writer and translator
- Salma Lakhani (born 1951/1952), Canadian 19th lieutenant governor of Alberta
- Salma Luévano, Mexican politician and LGBT+ rights activist
- Salma al-Malaika (1908–1953), Iraqi poet
- Salma Mancell-Egala, Ghanaian politician and diplomat
- Salma Maoulidi, Tanzanian women's rights activist
- Salma Mumin (born 1989), 21st century Ghanaian actress
- Salma Mumtaz (1926–2012), Pakistani film actress, director and producer
- Salma Negmeldin (born 1996), Egyptian synchronised swimmer
- Salma Paralluelo (born 2003), Spanish footballer and sprinter
- Salma Rachid (born 1994), Moroccan singer
- Salma Saleh (born 2003), Egyptian rhythmic gymnast
- Salma Salsabil (born 2002), Indonesian singer
- Salma Shabana (born 1976), Egyptian squash player
- Salma Shaheen (born 1954), Pakistani poet, writer, and researcher
- Salma al-Shehab (born 1988), Saudi Arabian student and prisoner of conscience
- Salma Siddiqui (1931–2017), Indian novelist
- Salma Sobhan (1937–2003), Bangladeshi lawyer, academic and human rights activist
- Salma Solaun (born 2005), Spanish rhythmic gymnast
- Salma Sultana, Bangladeshi veterinarian, entrepreneur and researcher
- Salma Tarik (born 1989), Egyptian international footballer
- Salma Yaqoob (born 1971), British politician
- Salma Zafar (born 1965), Pakistani actress
- Salma Zahid (born 1970), Canadian 21st-century politician
