= Zelma (given name) =

Primarily feminine given name

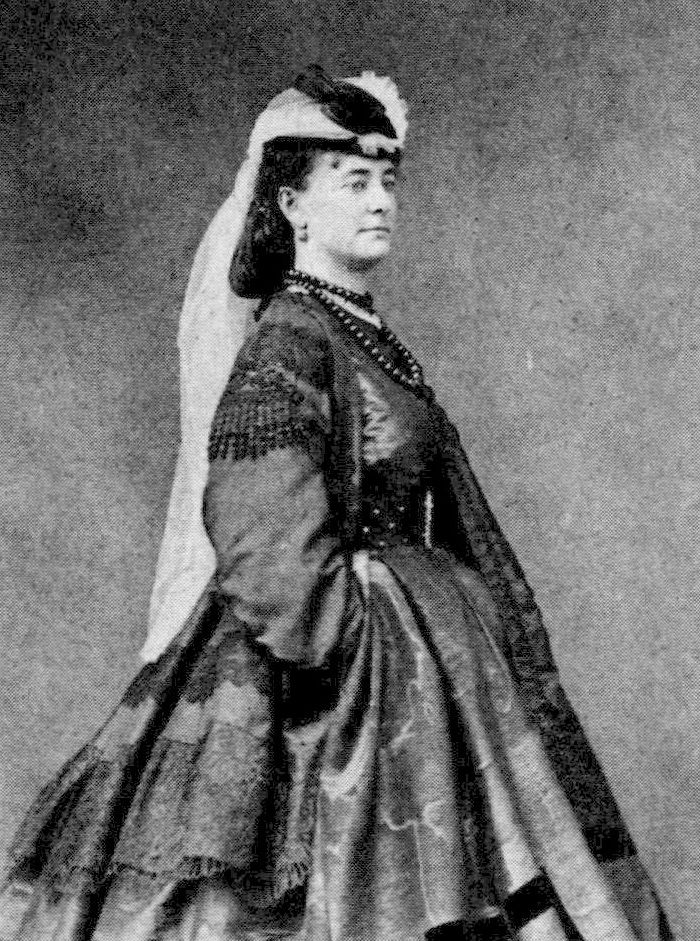
- Swedish actress Zelma Hedin (1827–1874)
- Gender: Primarily feminine
- Language: English

Origin
- Meaning: Variant of Selma

Zelma is a primarily feminine given name, a variant of the name Selma.

== Usage ==
Zelma was among the 1,000 most popular names in use for girls in the United States between 1880 and 1955. It peaked in 1902, when it was the 216th most popular name for American girls. It was among the top 100 names for girls born in Latvia between 1920 and 1935, and among the top 1,000 names for girls in Brazil between 1950 and 1960.

== Women ==
- Unita Zelma Blackwell (1933–2019), American civil rights activist
- Zelma Blakely (1921–1978), British painter, printer, engraver, and illustrator
- Zelma Bogue (1880–1975), American politician
- Zelma Cēsniece-Freidenfelde (1892–1929), Latvian physician and politician
- Zelma Davis, Liberian-born singer who rose to fame in the early 1990s
- Zelma "Zee" Edgell (1940–2020), Belizean-born American writer and academic
- Zelma Hedin (1827–1874), Swedish actress
- Kathryn Grayson, born Zelma Kathryn Elisabeth Hedrick (1922–2010), American actress and coloratura soprano
- Zelma Henderson (1920–2008), the last surviving plaintiff in the 1954 landmark federal school desegregation case
- Zelma Huppatz (1906–1982), Australian army nurse and hospital matron
- Zelma Long (born circa 1945), American enologist and winemaker
- Zelma Maine-Jackson, American hydrologist
- Zelma O'Neal (1903–1989), American actress, singer, and dancer
- Zelma Rawlston (c. 1873 – 1915), German-born American singer, comedian, and vaudeville performer specializing in male impersonation
- Zelma Roberts (1915–1988), New Zealand-born writer
- Zelma Watson George (1903–1994), African American philanthropist
- Zelma Wilson (1918–1996), American architect

== Men ==
- Zelma Wyche (1918–1999), African-American World War II veteran, civil rights activist, and politician
