= Abdul Khaliq (footballer) =

Pakistani footballer (died 2007)

- Khaliq in action for Karachi Port Trust

Personal information
- Date of birth: Unknown
- Place of birth: Karachi, Pakistan
- Date of death: 18 October 2007
- Place of death: Karachi, Pakistan
- Positions: Forward; midfielder

Youth career
- Lyari Labour Welfare Centre

Senior career*
Years	Team	Apps	(Gls)
1980s	Sindh Government Press		
1989–2006	Karachi Port Trust		

International career
1996–1997	Pakistan	6	(0)
- * Club domestic league appearances and goals

Abdul Khaliq (died 18 October 2007) was a Pakistani footballer who played as a forward and midfielder. Khaliq represented the Pakistan national team at the 1998 FIFA World Cup qualifiers in 1997. He died on 18 October 2007 during the 2007 Karsaz bombing.

== Club career ==
Starting his youth career at the football team of Lyari Labour Welfare Centre, Khaliq joined Sindh Government Press.

He moved to Karachi Port Trust in the late 1980s. He played major role when KPT clinched the PFF National Challenge Cup in 1990 at the KMC Stadium. At the 1996 PFF President's Cup, he scored a total of 5 goals, 3 behind the top scorer Qazi Ashfaq. After participating in several more editions, he was also crucial in helping finish the side as runner-up in the 2003 edition held in Quetta.

After representing the side in the National Football Championship, Khaliq also represented KPT in the newly established Pakistan Premier League.

== International career ==
Khaliq first represented the Pakistan national team at the 1996 AFC Asian Cup qualification. The next year, he played at the 1998 FIFA World Cup qualifiers. He made all four full appearances as starting player, where Pakistan ended the campaign unsuccessful after losing all matches against Iraq and Kazakhstan.

== Death ==
He died on 18 October 2007 during the 2007 Karsaz bombing in Karachi.

== Career statistics ==
=== International ===
Appearances and goals by national team and year
National team	Year	Apps	Goals
Pakistan	1996	2	0
Pakistan	1997	4	0
Total		6	0

== Honours ==
Karachi Port Trust

- PFF National Challenge Cup: 1990 (champion)
  - 2003 (runner-up)
