= Assassination of Benazir Bhutto =

2007 murder in Rawalpindi, Pakistan

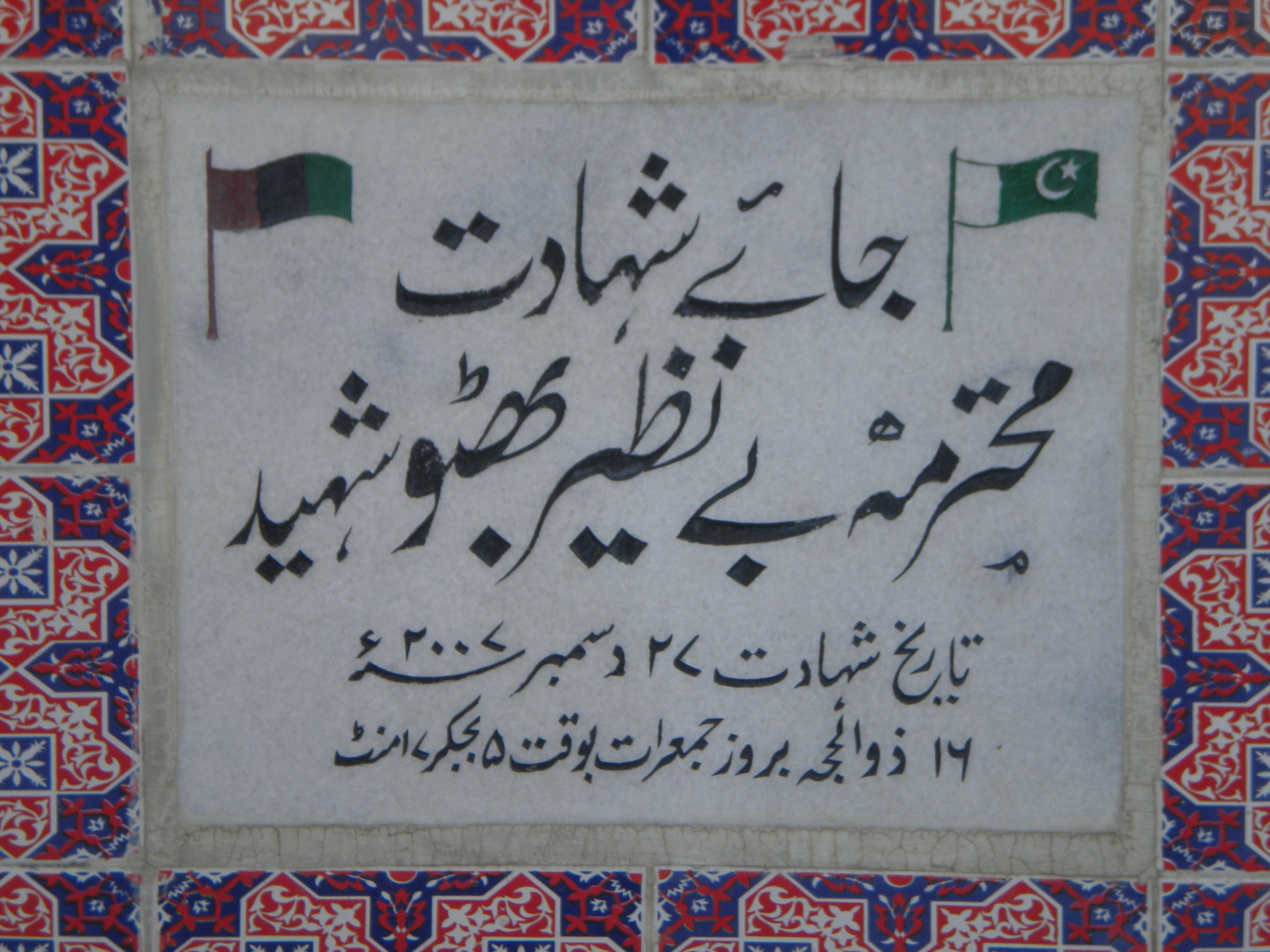
- Plaque marking the spot of the assassination, written in Urdu (translation: "Place of Martyrdom, Ms. Benazir Bhutto martyred")
- Location: 33°36′26″N 73°03′49″E; Liaquat National Bagh, Rawalpindi, Punjab, Pakistan
- Date: 27 December 2007; 18 years ago (18:16 PKT)
- Target: Benazir Bhutto
- Attack type: Target killing Shooting; Suicide bombing
- Deaths: At least 24 (including Bhutto)
- Perpetrators: al-Qaeda; Tehrik-i-Taliban Pakistan
- Motive: Unknown
- Charges: Pervez Musharraf was charged with murder.

Benazir Bhutto was assassinated on 27 December 2007 in Rawalpindi, Pakistan. Bhutto, the former prime minister of Pakistan and then-leader of the opposition Pakistan People's Party, had been campaigning ahead of elections scheduled for January 2008. Shots were fired at her after a political rally at Liaqat National Bagh, and a suicide bomb was detonated immediately following the shooting. She was declared dead at 18:16 local time (13:16 UTC), at Rawalpindi General Hospital. Twenty-three other people were killed by the bombing. Bhutto had previously survived a similar attempt on her life in Karachi (the 2007 Karsaz bombing) that killed at least 180 people, after her return from exile two months earlier. Following her assassination, the Election Commission of Pakistan postponed the general elections by a month, which Bhutto's party later won.

Though early reports indicated that she had been hit by shrapnel or the gunshots, the Pakistani Interior Ministry initially stated that Bhutto died of a skull fracture sustained when the force of the explosion caused her head to strike the sunroof of the vehicle. Bhutto's aides rejected this version of the story, and argued instead that she suffered two gunshots before the bomb detonation. The Interior Ministry subsequently backtracked from its previous claim. In May 2007, Bhutto had asked for additional protection from private security contractors Blackwater and ArmorGroup. An investigation of the assassination by the United Nations stated that "Ms. Bhutto's assassination could have been prevented if adequate security measures had been taken."

== Background ==
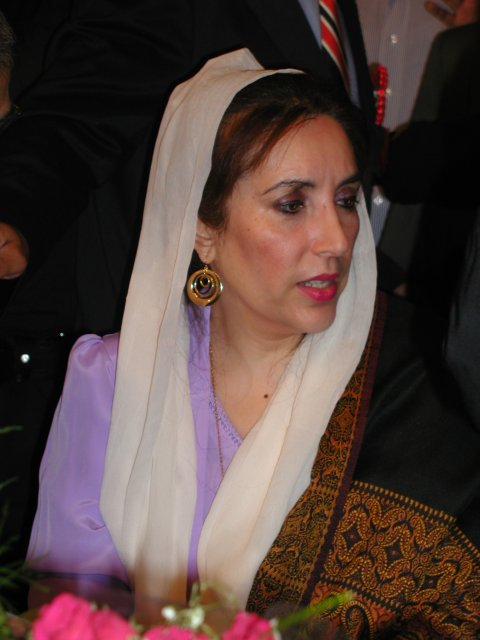
Benazir Bhutto, September 2004.

Bhutto had opted for self-exile while her court cases for corruption remained pending in foreign and Pakistani courts. After eight years in exile in Dubai and London, Bhutto returned to Karachi on 18 October 2007 to prepare for the 2008 national elections, allowed by a possible power-sharing deal with President Pervez Musharraf.

Bhutto survived an assassination attempt in Karachi during this homecoming. En route to a rally in Karachi on 18 October 2007, two explosions occurred shortly after she had landed and left Jinnah International Airport returning from her exile. Bhutto was not injured, but the explosions, later found to be a suicide bomb attack, killed 139 people and injured at least 450. The dead included at least 50 of the security guards from her Pakistan Peoples Party, who had formed a human chain around her truck to keep potential bombers away, as well as six police officers. A number of senior officials were injured. Bhutto was escorted unharmed from the scene.

After the bombing, Bhutto and her husband asked Musharraf for greater security, including tinted windows, jammers for bombs, private guards, and four police vehicles. These calls were echoed by three U.S. senators who wrote to Musharraf. Bhutto's supporters and the Pakistani government dispute whether or not she was provided adequate protection. The Israeli newspaper Maariv reported that Bhutto further asked the American Central Intelligence Agency (CIA), Britain's Scotland Yard and Israel's Mossad several weeks before the assassination to help provide for her protection. Israeli officials had not yet decided whether or not to provide aid because they did not want to upset relations with Pakistan and India. Bhutto also tried to obtain private security personnel, approaching both the U.S.-based Blackwater and UK-based ArmorGroup. However, the Pakistani government refused to give visas to the foreign security contractors. Despite this, American diplomats provided Bhutto with confidential U.S. intelligence on threats against her. After the assassination, President Musharraf denied that Bhutto should have received more security, saying that her death was primarily her own fault because she took "unnecessary risks" and should have exited the rally more quickly.

== Assassination ==
Bhutto had just addressed a rally of Pakistan People's Party supporters in the city of Rawalpindi when the rally was rocked by an explosion. Initial police reports stated that one or more assassins fired at Bhutto's bulletproof white Toyota Land Cruiser just as she was about to drive off after the rally. A suicide bomber detonating a bomb next to her vehicle followed. According to Getty Images photographer John Moore, Bhutto was standing through her vehicle's sunroof to wave at supporters, and fell back inside after three gunshots. The Times of India aired an amateur clip showing the assassin firing three gun shots at Bhutto before the blast.

Following the incident, an unconscious Bhutto was taken to the Rawalpindi General Hospital at 17:35 local time, where doctors led by Rawalpindi Medical College Principal Mohammad Musaddiq Khan tried to resuscitate her, performing a "left anterolateral thoracotomy for open cardiac massage". Sadiq Khan, Mohammad Khan's father, had tried to save Liaquat Ali Khan when he was assassinated in the same park and rushed to the same hospital in 1951. Although Pakistan People's Party spokesman Farhatullah Babar initially said that Bhutto was safe, she was declared dead at 18:16 local time (13:16 UTC).

=== Cause of her death ===
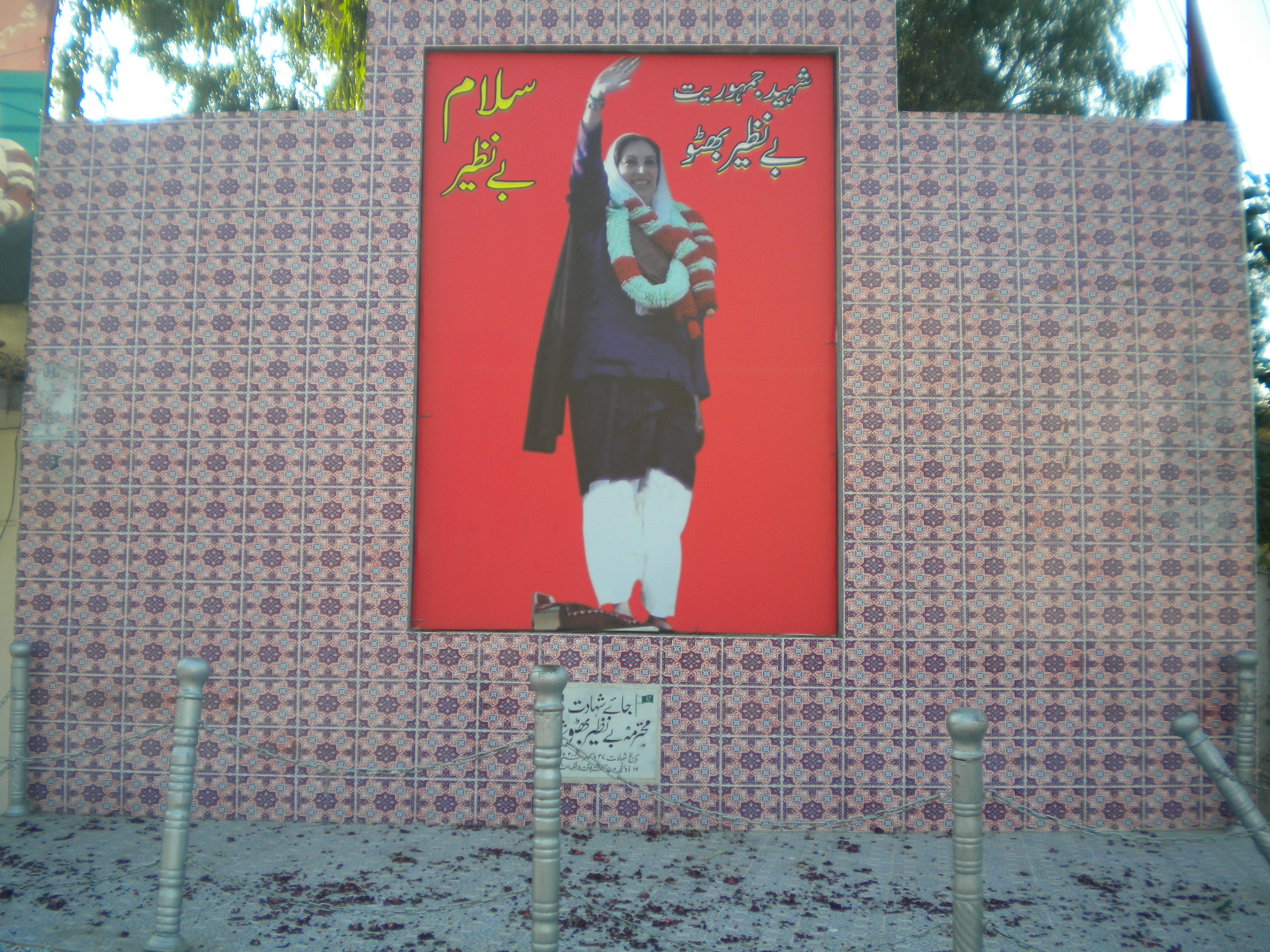
Memorial at the site of the assassination

Bhutto's cause of death has been much discussed and debated. Some commentators suggested that this debate was motivated by attempts to define Bhutto's legacy: perhaps Bhutto would be considered a martyr if she died by gunshot, but not if she died by hitting her head following a bomb blast. Others asserted that the arguments against a death by gunshot were intended to blunt criticism that she was not adequately protected.

Initial reports based on Pakistani Interior Ministry information reported that Bhutto was killed by a gunshot wound to the neck. Rehman Malik, a security adviser for Pakistan Peoples Party, suggested that the killer opened fire as Bhutto left the rally and that he hit her in the neck and chest before he detonated the explosives he was wearing. Javed Cheema, an interior ministry, stated that her injuries were caused either by her having been shot or from pellets packed into the detonated bomb that acted as shrapnel.

On 28 December, however, the cause of Bhutto's death became less clear. Pakistan's Interior Ministry announced that they now felt Bhutto's death was as a result of a neck fracture sustained when she ducked or fell into her vehicle and hit the sunroof catch immediately after the gunshots but later reported her cause of death as a skull fracture. According to an Associated Press report, the Ministry stated "Bhutto was killed when she tried to duck back into the vehicle, and the shock waves from the blast knocked her head into a lever attached to the sunroof, fracturing her skull." The Ministry further added, in contradiction of the official hospital account, that Bhutto suffered no gunshot or shrapnel injuries and that all gunshots missed her.

Pakistan Peoples Party spokesman Farhatullah Babar rejected claims that Bhutto's death was caused by an accident. Bhutto's lawyer and a senior official in the Pakistan Peoples Party, Farooq Naik, said that the report was "baseless" and "a pack of lies". He went on to support the view that the cause of death was two bullets hitting Bhutto in the abdomen and the head. An anonymous Toyota official also rejected the notion that she could have even hit the lever based on its location in the car (a Toyota Land Cruiser).

In statements made to Pakistan's The News, Mohammad Mussadiq Khan, one of the doctors who treated Bhutto at Rawalpindi General Hospital, described severe and depressed skull fractures, oval in overall shape, on the right side of Bhutto's head. He apparently saw no other injuries and downplayed the possibility of bullet wounds, although he had previously spoken of them. One anonymous doctor said that Pakistani authorities took Bhutto's medical records immediately after her death, and that they told doctors to stop talking.

On 31 December, Athar Minallah of the Rawalpindi General Hospital released a statement (described as "clinical notes") signed by seven persons involved in Bhutto's treatment at the hospital. These persons were not pathologists and did not conduct a formal autopsy. The statement first narrates the course of treatment, from Bhutto's arrival at the hospital until she was declared dead. The second part of the statement details the head wound and notes that "Detailed external examination of the body did not reveal any other external injury". X-rays had been taken of the head wound and were interpreted in the statement. The cause of death was declared to be "Open head injury with depressed skull fracture, leading to cardiopulmonary arrest".

According to The Washington Post, the crime scene was cleared before any forensic examination could be completed and no formal autopsy was performed before burial. Despite the ambiguity surrounding her death, Bhutto's husband Asif Zardari did not allow a formal autopsy to be conducted citing his fears regarding the procedure being carried out in Pakistan.

On 1 January 2008, Pakistan's Interior Ministry backtracked on its statement that Benazir Bhutto had died from hitting her head on the sunroof latch. Ministry spokesman, Javed Iqbal Cheema said that the ministry would wait for forensic investigations before making a conclusion on Bhutto's cause of death.

On 8 February 2008, investigators from Scotland Yard concluded that Benazir Bhutto died after hitting her head as she was tossed by the force of a suicide blast, not from an assassin's bullet. However, as quoted in an article in The New York Times: "It is unclear how the Scotland Yard investigators reached such conclusive findings absent autopsy results or other potentially important evidence that was washed away by cleanup crews in the immediate aftermath of the blast." In the report, UK Home Office pathologist Nathaniel Cary said that while a gunshot wound to her head or trunk could not be entirely excluded as a possibility, "the only tenable cause for the rapidly fatal head injury in this case is that it occurred as the result of impact due to the effects of the bomb-blast." The findings were consistent with the Pakistani government's explanation of Bhutto's assassination, an account that had been greeted with disbelief by Bhutto's supporters.

=== Funeral ===
Bhutto's funeral occurred on the afternoon of 28 December 2007. Her body was moved from Chaklala Airbase in Rawalpindi to Sukkur Airport on 28 December at 01:20. All of her children and her husband travelled with her body. Mourners from all over Pakistan made their way to Larkana to take part in the funeral ceremony for the former Prime Minister. The family delivered the body to its site of burial via helicopter. Bhutto was laid to rest beside her father in the family tomb.

== Aftermath ==
=== Riots ===
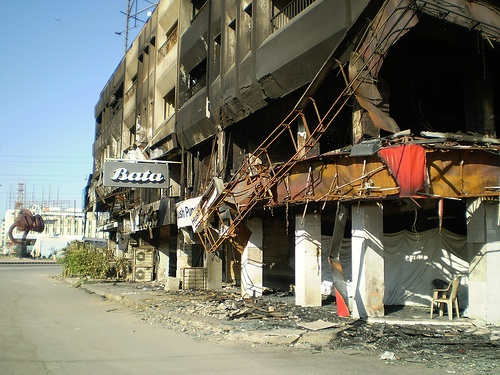
Burned buildings with broken windows in Karachi, following rioting

After Bhutto's death, supporters wept and broke the hospital's glass doors, threw stones at cars, and reportedly chanted "Dog, Musharraf, dog" outside the hospital, referring to President Musharraf. Others attacked police and burned election campaign posters and tyres. Some opposition groups said that the assassination could lead to civil war, and other commentators said that the upcoming elections would likely be postponed.

Demonstrations were widespread in Pakistan with police using tear gas and batons to break up angry demonstrations in Peshawar. Some protesters torched the billboards of Musharraf, firing in the air and screaming. Protests in Multan also had protesters burning tires and blocking traffic. Similar scenes were witnessed in Karachi, Bhutto's home city. Police in Sindh were put on red alert. Two police officers were shot in Karachi during the riots following the assassination.

Musharraf ordered a crackdown on rioters and looters to "ensure safety and security." The Pakistan Rangers announced shoot-on-sight orders against anyone inciting violence or arson, although attempts to avoid direct confrontation were maintained. On 28 December the riots escalated, especially in the Sindh Province, the homeground of Bhutto. Foreign outlets, trains, banks and vehicles were destroyed or burned and protesters took over the streets, chanting slogans and setting tires on fire in several cities. At least 47 people died in the riots. Rioters destroyed 176 banks, 34 gasoline stations and hundreds of cars and shops. 28 December was the first day of a general strike called by many groups, ranging from political parties to various professional groups.

Banks were attacked and the buildings were burned in many cities of Sindh. Most of the ATMs were destroyed and some looted.

Hundreds of private buses were burned in all parts of the country. There were also incidents of burning of trains in Sind. According to the Daily Jang:

Twenty-eight railway stations, 13 railway engines and seven trains were burned resulting over three billion rupees' loss. The whole rail system had collapsed since the night of December 27. Thousands of passengers were on the railway stations waiting for restoration. There were no sign of restoration for some days. Thousands of private cars were also damaged all over Pakistan by the angry mobs, mainly youth. The houses and offices of politicians, local government mayors and administration were the other victims of the mass reaction. They were either burned or damaged.

Over 100 people died in the incidents related to mass protest, either by police or in the crossfire of different groups.

=== Pakistan Peoples Party ===
Bhutto's son, Bilawal Zardari, read her instructions on the future of the Pakistan Peoples Party on 30 December. In that will, she had designated her husband Asif Ali Zardari as her political successor but Zardari made their then nineteen-year-old son, Bilawal, the Chairman of the PPP as Zardari favoured their son to represent Bhutto's legacy, in part to avoid division within the party due to his own unpopularity.

=== Elections and electoral fraud report ===
Pakistan's election commission met on 31 December to decide whether or not to delay the January elections; two days before they hinted that they would need to because pre-election preparation had been "adversely affected". A senior election commission official subsequently announced that the election would be delayed until "the later part of February".

Senator Latif Khosa, one of Bhutto's top aides, reported that she was planning to divulge evidence of fraud in the upcoming election following the event where the assassination took place. The pair co-wrote a 160-page dossier on the subject, with Bhutto outlining tactics she alleged would be put into play, including intimidation, excluding voters and fake ballots being planted in boxes. The report was titled Yet another stain on the face of democracy. In a statement he made on 1 January 2008, Khosa said:

The state agencies are manipulating the whole process, there is rigging by the ISI (Inter-Services Intelligence), the Election Commission and the previous government, which is still continuing to hold influence. They were on the rampage.

Khosa said that they had planned to give the dossier to two American lawmakers on the evening of her assassination and release it publicly soon after that. One of the claims in the dossier was that US financial aid had been secretly misappropriated for electoral fraud and another was that the ISI has a 'mega-computer' which could hack into any other computer and was connected to the Election Commission's system. A spokesman for President Musharraf called the claims "ridiculous".

In the run up to the election, the 'sympathy vote' was considered crucial for the Pakistan Peoples Party, which was expected to win the National Assembly. The election results yielded a majority for the Pakistan Peoples Party in the National Assembly, and in the Provincial Assembly of Sindh.

=== Economy ===
Following a three-day shut-down, the benchmark index, the KSE100 index, of the Karachi Stock Exchange fell 4.7%. The Pakistani rupee fell to its lowest level against the U.S. dollar since October 2001. The stock exchange has a history of recovering after political unrest. The Pakistan Railways suffered losses of PKR 12.3 billion as a direct result of riots following the assassination. Sixty-three railway stations, 149 bogies, and 29 locomotives were damaged within two days of Bhutto's death. In the first four days after the assassination, Karachi suffered losses of US$1 billion. By the fifth day, the cost of country-wide violence amounted to 8% of the GDP.

== Responsibility ==
Adnkronos claimed that al-Qaeda second-in-command Ayman al-Zawahiri ordered the killing in October 2007. U.S. intelligence officials said that they could not confirm this claim of responsibility. Nonetheless, U.S. analysts said that al-Qaeda was a likely, or even a prime suspect. For its part, the Pakistani Interior Ministry (of the previous Musharraf administration) stated that it had proof that al-Qaeda was behind the assassination, stating "that the suicide bomber belonged to Lashkar-e-Jhangvi—an al Qaeda-linked Sunni Muslim militant group that the government has blamed for hundreds of killings". The Interior Ministry also claimed to have intercepted a statement by militant leader Baitullah Mehsud, said to be linked to al-Qaeda, in which he congratulated his followers for carrying out the assassination. On 29 December a Mehsud spokesman told the Associated Press that Mehsud was not involved in the assassination: "I strongly deny it. Tribal people have their own customs. We don't strike women. It is a conspiracy by government, military and intelligence agencies." The Pakistan Peoples Party also called the government's blame of Mehsud a diversion: "The story that al-Qaida or Baitullah Mehsud did it appears to us to be a planted story, an incorrect story, because they want to divert the attention," said Farhatullah Babar, a spokesman for Bhutto's party. On 18 January 2008, CIA Director Michael Hayden claimed that Mehsud and his network was responsible.

In a letter which she wrote to Musharraf on 16 October 2007, Bhutto named four persons who were involved in an alleged plot to kill her: current Intelligence Bureau (IB) Chief Ijaz Shah, former chief minister of Punjab Chaudhry Pervaiz Elahi, former chief minister of Sindh Arbab Ghulam Rahim, and the former ISI chief, Hamid Gul, as those who posed a threat to her life. British newspaper The Times suggested that elements within the Pakistani Inter-Services Intelligence with close ties to Islamists might have been behind the killing, and it also asserted that it is unlikely that Musharraf would have ordered the assassination. October 2007 emails from Bhutto in which she wrote that she would blame Musharraf for her death if she were killed, because the Musharraf government was not providing adequate security to her, were also published after Bhutto's death. Soon after the killing, many of Bhutto's supporters believed that the Musharraf government was involved in the assassination. On 30 December, Scotland on Sunday quoted MI5 sources stated that factions of Pakistan's Inter-Services Intelligence may have been responsible for the assassination.

=== United Nations inquiry ===
UN Secretary-General Ban Ki-moon announced on 5 February 2009 that at the Government of Pakistan's request, a commission would be sent to investigate Bhutto's assassination. Armed with a modest mandate and a limited timeframe, a three-member team arrived at Islamabad on 16 July 2009. The unit, headed by the Chilean diplomat Heraldo Muñoz, found themselves plunged into a murky world of conspiracy theories, power politics and conflicting agendas. Muñoz was supported by the Indonesian official Marzuki Darusman and Peter FitzGerald, a retired Irish police officer who headed the initial inquiry into the assassination of Lebanese Premier Rafik Hariri in 2005.

The UN was asked to send a team to dispel a conspiracy theory that claimed that Zardari himself had orchestrated his wife's death, a notion most analysts dismissed because of absence of any concrete evidence. Basically the UN team's mandate was to "establish the facts and circumstances of the assassination" and not to undertake a criminal investigation, which remained responsibility of the Pakistani authorities.

A formal investigation by the United Nations commenced. The report concluded that the security measures provided to Bhutto by the government were "fatally insufficient and ineffective". Furthermore, the report stated that the treatment of the crime scene after her death went "beyond mere incompetence". The report stated that "police actions and omissions, including the hosing down of the crime scene and failure to collect and preserve evidence, inflicted irreparable damage to the investigation".

In its report, the UN Commission stated that: A range of government officials failed profoundly in their efforts first to protect Ms Bhutto and second to investigate with vigour all those responsible for her murder, not only in the execution of the attack, but also in its conception, planning and financing. ... Responsibility for Ms Bhutto's security on the day of her assassination rested with the Federal Government, the government of Punjab and the Rawalpindi District Police. None of these entities took necessary measures to respond to the extraordinary and urgent security risks that they knew she faced.

Among other failings: the police co-ordinated poorly with the PPP's own security; police escort units did not protect Ms Bhutto's vehicle as tasked; parked police vehicles blocked the emergency route; and the police took grossly inadequate steps to clear the crowd so that Ms Bhutto's vehicle would have safe passage on leaving Liaquat Bagh. The performance of individual police officers and police leadership was poor in areas of forward planning, accountability and command and control.

The heroism of individual PPP supporters, many of whom sacrificed themselves to protect Ms Bhutto should have been properly canalised by the Chief of PPP's security [Mr Rehman Malik]. More serious, Ms Bhutto was left vulnerable in a severely damaged vehicle by the irresponsible and hasty departure of the bullet-proof Mercedes-Benz which, as the back-up vehicle, was an essential part of her convoy [perhaps purposefully taken away by Rehman Malik, Babar Awan & Farhatullah Babar].

The collection of 23 pieces of evidence was manifestly inadequate in a case that should have resulted in thousands.... Hosing down the crime scene so soon after the blast goes beyond mere incompetence and needed fixing criminal responsibility on many.

The deliberate prevention by CPO Saud Aziz of a post mortem examination of Ms Bhutto hindered a definitive determination of the cause of her death. It was patently unrealistic for the CPO to expect that Mr Zardari would allow an autopsy on his arrival in Pakistan while in the meantime her remains had been placed in a coffin and brought to the airport. The autopsy should have been carried out at RGH long before Mr Zardari arrived. The Commission was persuaded that the Rawalpindi police chief, CPO Saud Aziz, did not act independently of higher authorities, either in the decision to hose down the crime scene or to impede the post-mortem examination.

=== Official indictment ===
On 5 November 2011, a Pakistani court indicted two police officers in connection with Bhutto's assassination, among them, the former police chief of Rawalpindi. The two men were in charge of the former prime minister's security and were previously arrested and charged with "conspiracy as well as abetment in the murder" and "changing the security plan". A further five men were also indicted, all of them believed to have been affiliated with Baitullah Mehsud, the Pakistani Taliban leader who the government blamed for the attack. On 20 August 2013, ex-President Pervez Musharraf was indicted on three charges of murder, conspiracy to murder, and facilitation of murder in connection with his alleged failure to provide adequate security to Bhutto—charges for which he reportedly denied his responsibility.

On 31 August 2017, a Pakistani anti-terrorism court declared that Musharraf was a wanted fugitive due to the role which he played in connection with Bhutto's murder and acquitted five suspected Pakistani Taliban of conspiracy to commit murder due to lack of evidence, while sentencing two high-ranking police officers to 17 years in prison, one for mishandling security at the Bhutto rally and the other for mishandling evidence at the crime scene. On 16 December 2019, Musharraf, in exile for hospitalization in Dubai, was sentenced to death in Pakistan in absentia for high treason, for suspending the constitution and imposing a state of emergency a decade early, with right of appeal. The United Arab Emirates has no current extradition with Pakistan, though Musharraf's poor health prevented him from being moved even if there was.

On 9 February 2023 a special division bench of two judges of the Lahore High Court heard eight appeals in Bhutto's murder case. Notices were issued to various individuals, including former President Zardari and accused parties, while the appeal against Musharraf was dismissed due to his death.

== Reactions ==
=== Pakistani government ===
According to state television, Musharraf held an emergency cabinet meeting after he received word of the blast. He then addressed the nation, saying that "We shall not rest till we tackle this problem and eliminate all the terrorists. This is the only way the nation will be able to move forward, otherwise this will be the biggest obstacle to our advancement." In a televised address, President Musharraf publicly condemned the killing of Bhutto, proclaiming a three-day mourning period with all national flags at half-mast. Mahmud Ali Durrani, the Pakistani ambassador to the United States, called Bhutto's death "a national tragedy" and stated that "... we have lost one of our important, very important and, I would stress, liberal leaders."

==== Opposition ====
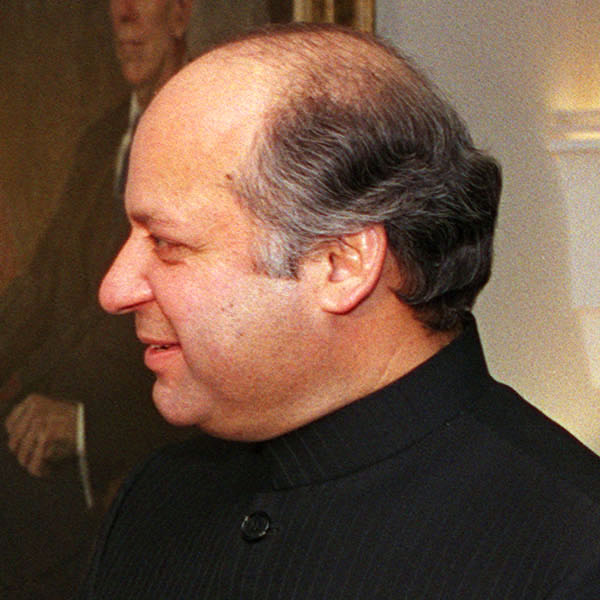
Nawaz Sharif (pictured in 1998) expressed his solidarity with Bhutto's family and political workers.

Nawaz Sharif was the first mainstream political leader to reach the hospital and express his solidarity with Bhutto's family and political workers. He vowed to "fight your [Bhutto's] war from now on" and calling the day of her assassination the "darkest, gloomiest day in the history of this country". Despite extreme political enmity between the two leaders during the 1990s, both vowed to introduce politics of tolerance before returning from exile and had earlier signed the Charter of Democracy. After signing the charter, they said that they would work for an end to the rule of President Musharraf. Earlier in the day, Nawaz Sharif's political meeting had also been shot at, resulting in the death of four people.

Chairman Imran Khan of the Tehreek-e-Insaf party strongly condemned the assassination of Benazir Bhutto. "It is a dastardly act designed to destabilise Pakistan with the government responsible for not providing her security though she was demanding it. We must fight this menace of terrorism. It is a black day in the history of Pakistan and an irreparable loss to this country," Khan said.

Pakistan Peoples Party Washington, D.C. chapter president Javaid Manzoor said, "We [Bhutto's supporters] are shocked. We are stunned. Every single one of us is mourning the loss of our leader," also stating that he believed that the next election, scheduled for 8 January would be cancelled. Pakistan Peoples Party senior vice chairman Ameen Faheem later called for a 40-day period of mourning across Pakistan. Pakistan Peoples Party spokesman Farhatullah Babar said the Pakistan Peoples Party was unhappy with the government's declaration of the death coming as a result of an accident and said that the Pakistan Peoples Party wanted to see a change in the direction of the investigation. He called for an independent inquiry into the assassination by international experts. He also said that "had the government accepted our demand of conducting an inquiry into Karachi's 18 October blast by international experts, this incident would not have happened."

=== International reaction ===
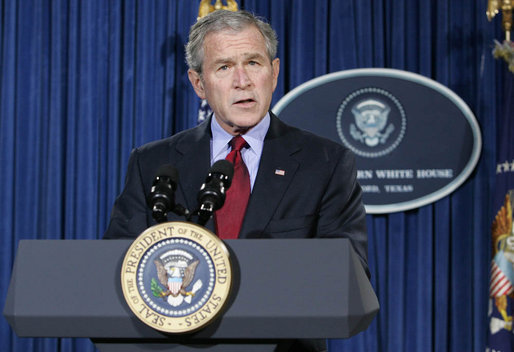
U.S. President George W. Bush condemned the assassination in a 27 December press conference.

Bhutto's assassination was met with widespread condemnation by members of the international community, including Pakistan's regional neighbours Afghanistan, China, India, Bangladesh and Iran. Indian Prime Minister Manmohan Singh praised Bhutto's efforts for the improvement of Indo-Pakistani relations. The United Nations Security Council held an emergency meeting and unanimously condemned the assassination, a call echoed by UN Secretary-General Ban Ki-moon.

== See also ==
- All pages with titles containing Shaheed Benazir Bhutto – things named in her honour
- Assassination of Liaquat Ali Khan – 1951 murder in Rawalpindi, Pakistan
- List of unsolved murders (2000–present)
- Terrorism in Pakistan
- Zulfikar Ali Bhutto § Death – the death of her father
