= Salima =

Salima may refer to:

== People ==
- Salima Abi Rashed (1887–1919), Lebanon's first female lawyer
- Salima Aga Khan (born 1940), ex-wife of Prince Karim Aga Khan
- Salima Belhaj (born 1978), Dutch-Moroccan politician
- Salima El Ouali Alami (born 1983), Moroccan athlete
- Salima Ghezali (born 1958), Algerian journalist and writer
- Salima Hamouche (born 1984), Algerian volleyball player
- Salima Hashmi (born 1942), Pakistani artist and writer
- Salima Ikram (born 1965), Pakistani archaeologist
- Salima Machamba (1874–1964), Sultan of Mohéli
- Salima Mazari (born 1980), Afghan politician
- Salima Mukansanga (born 1988), Rwandan football referee
- Salima Murad (1905–1974), Iraqi Jewish singer
- Salima Rockwell (born 1974), American volleyball player, coach and broadcaster
- Salima Saa (born 1971), French politician
- Salima Salih (born 1942), Iraqi short story writer, translator and artist
- Salima Souakri (born 1974), Algerian judoka
- Salima Tete (born 2001), Indian field hockey player
- Salima Yenbou (born 1971), French politician
- Salima Ziani (born 1994), Moroccan singer
- Salima, a fictional character in Team Psykick.

== Other ==
- Salima, Malawi, a town in Malawi
- Salima District, a district in Malawi
- Salima, Lebanon, a town in Metn district, Lebanon

== See also ==
- Salimah
- Selima (disambiguation)
