= Saleem Badat =

South African sociologist

Program Director: International Higher Education and Strategic Projects program, The Andrew W Mellon Foundation
- In office August 2014 – 2019

Vice-chancellor of Rhodes University
- In office June 2006 – July 2014
- Preceded by: David Woods
- Succeeded by: Sizwe Mabizela

Personal details
- Born: August 29, 1957 (age 69) Durban, South Africa
- Children: Hussein and Faizal
- Profession: Research Professor

Saleem Badat is a South African university leader, critical sociologist, higher education policy specialist and researcher. He is Research Professor in the Department of History at the University of the Free State.

== Early politics ==
Badat was eighteen years old when the 1976 Soweto Uprising occurred, which shaped his political consciousness and eventually his student activism. He was chair of the student Wages Commission at Natal University and a member of the Release Mandela Committee. He was involved in and led various student organizations at Natal and the University of Cape Town. In 1983, Badat became the coordinator of the Western Cape community newspaper, Grassroots.

== Career ==
Badat started his professional career as researcher into higher education policy in the United Kingdom and then at the University of the Western Cape under the tutelage of Harold Wolpe Upon Wolpe's untimely death, Badat took over as the Director of the Education Policy Unit. In 1999, he became the founding CEO of the South African Council on Higher Education, a position which he held until 2006. In his role as CEO, he built the Council up to serve as statutory advisory and national accreditation body for higher education in South Africa. From June 2006 until July 2014, Badat served as the first black vice-chancellor of Rhodes University in Grahamstown, South Africa.

Badat holds Bachelors and Honours degrees in the Social Sciences from the University of KwaZulu-Natal, a Certificate in Higher Education and Science Policy from Boston University, and a Doctor of Philosophy in Sociology from the University of York.

Between August 2014 and December 2018, he was the Program Director of the International Higher Education and Strategic Projects program at the Andrew W. Mellon Foundation. His portfolio encompassed grant making in the arts and humanities to research universities in South Africa, Uganda, Ghana, Egypt, and Lebanon and to pan-African and pan-Arab institutions working in higher education.

Over the course of his career, Badat has served on numerous boards, commissions, and committees, including as chairperson of Higher Education South Africa (now: Universities South Africa) and the Association of African Universities Scientific Committee on Higher Education.

Badat has received several honorary degrees during his career. In 2004, the University of the Free State awarded him an honorary doctorate for his contributions to higher education policy, followed in 2008 by an honorary doctorate from his alma mater, the University of York, and eventually in 2015, he received an honorary doctorate from Rhodes University.

== Publications ==
As a critical scholar, Badat's core research and writings concern social equity and redress, diversity and inclusion and the decolonization and.transformation of universities and society. He is interested in questions of social reproduction and transformation and structure and sgency. Based on his PhD, Badat published in 2002 Black Student Politics, Higher Education and Apartheid from SASO to SANSCO, 1968-1990 (HSRC Press, republished in 2016 by Taylor & Francis). In 2009 he published Black Man, You are on Your Own (Steve Biko Foundation / STE Publishers 2010), and on 2012/2013, The Forgotten People: Political Banishment under Apartheid (Jacana Press and Brill). In 2026, Badat published an in-depth memoir of his personal, professional and political journey through higher education in the book Roads to Rhodes University and Beyond: Adventures in Knowledge and Activism (UKZN Press). In addition to his book publications, Badat published over 60 scholarly articles and policy reports.
