= Salim Bhagalia =

South African cricketer

Salim Bhagalia (died 2012) was a South African cricketer of Indian descent. Bhagalia was best known as one of the best fast bowlers produced by the Indian community in South Africa in the early 1940s.

He captained the provincial Eastern Transvaal Cricket Union and played for Ermelo and Krugersdorp Old Boys Clubs.

He also represented The Wits Union, Transvaal, and South African Indians. He retired at the age of 59. He died in November 2012 aged 90.
