= Salimah =

Salimah is a feminine given name. Notable people with the surname include:

- Salimah Aga Khan (born 1940), Indian fashion model; ex-wife of Aga Khan IV
- Salima Salih (born 1954), American photographer

== See also ==
- Salima (disambiguation)
