= Salim Al Mamari =

Omani footballer (born 1999)

Personal information
- Date of birth: 4 May 1999 (age 27)
- Height: 1.74 m (5 ft 9 in)
- Position: Defender

Youth career
- –2018: Al Jazira

Senior career*
Years	Team	Apps	(Gls)
2019–2021	Baniyas	5	(0)
2022–2023	Baynounah	8	(1)
2024–2025	Al-Hamriyah		
- * Club domestic league appearances and goals as of 17:17, 1 February 2020 (UTC)

Salim Al Mamari (born 4 May 1999) is an Omani professional footballer who plays as a defender.

== Career statistics ==
=== Club ===
As of 1 February 2020.

Club	Season	League			Cup		Continental		Other		Total	
Club	Season	Division	Apps	Goals	Apps	Goals	Apps	Goals	Apps	Goals	Apps	Goals
Baniyas	2018–19	UAE Pro League	2	0	0	0	0	0	0	0	2	0
Baniyas	2019–20	UAE Pro League	3	0	1 (Note: Appearances in the UAE League Cup)	0	0	0	0	0	4	0
Career total			5	0	1	0	0	0	0	0	6	0
