= Salim Maush =

Lebanese critic, researcher and academic

- Born: 1948 (age 77–78); Chouf District, Lebanon
- Occupations: writer, critic, researcher

Salim Maush (born 1948) (Arabic: سالم المعوش) is a Lebanese critic, researcher and academic. He has contributions in literary criticism, language, biography, and prison poetry, and novels. He received honorary certificates, cultural and literary.

== Early life ==
Salim Maush was born in the town of Barja (Chouf District – Lebanon) in 1948. He completed his pre-university education in his hometown, then moved to the Lebanese University to obtain a BA in Arabic Language and Literature from the College of Arts and Humanities in the year 1974. Then he got his master's degree in 1980, from the same college. He graduated from the National Institute of Administration and Development in Lebanon in 1982 with a diploma. Before that, he worked as a teacher in his hometown schools and other public schools, for the middle school stage, between 1969 and 1975. Then he taught high school students between 1975 and 1981.

Maush earned two doctorate degrees in Arabic Language and Literature: the first one was from Saint Joseph University in Beirut in 1985, and a Lebanese PhD (state) from the Lebanese University in 1998.

== Administrative and cultural activities ==
Maush worked in the fields of administration, education, journalism and broadcasting. He held the position of head of a department in the General Secretariat of the Presidency of the Lebanese Council of Ministers from 1983 to 1989.

Also he was assigned to head the district mayor of Chouf District, and head of the Al Kharroub region from 1986 to 1989.

Maush devoted himself to higher education level at the Lebanese University, until he retired in 2012. He obtained the rank of professor for his research and literature in literary, linguistic and cultural criticism. He took over a number of tasks at the university besides teaching, he was the president of the Arabic Language Department in the fifth branch (Saida). He was also rapporteur in the committee for accepting master's projects and the faculty of professors' delegates committee. As well as discussing and supervising several students in the two stages of preparing masters and doctoral degrees.

Maush taught also at the Islamic University Institute (Beirut branch), and at the Islamic University (Lebanon). He has held a number of tasks in the administrative body of the Lebanese Writers Union for several times, as well as within the advisory body for a number of Arab academic periodicals, including the Al Hadatha Journal. He is also preside the cultural committee in the meeting of university professors in Al-Kharroub region. He has many participations in literary, cultural and intellectual conferences and seminars in Lebanon and the Arab world.

== Works ==
Maush has a lot of books, research and studies published in Lebanon and the Arab world, and his books include:

=== In culture, literature and language ===
- "Islamic Features in the Arabic Novel" – Dar Al-Hadi 1992
- "Elia Abu Madi between east and west" – (original text: Iliya Abu Madi bayna al-Sharq wa-al-Gharb) 1997
- "The image of the West in the Arab novel" – (original text: Surat al-Gharb fi al-riwayah al-'Arabiyah) 1998
- "Islamic knowledge bases in early Islamic literature" – Dar Al-Nahda (original text: al-Qawā‘id al-ma‘rifīyah al-Islāmīyah fī adab Ṣadr al-Islām) 2001
- "Risks of cultural dominance; Culture of Power or the Power of Culture" – (original text: Makhāṭir al-haymanah al-thaqāfīyah) 2003
- "Prison Poetry in Modern and Contemporary Arabic Literature" – (original text: Shi‘r al-sujūn fī al-adab al-‘Arabī al-ḥadīth wa-al-mu‘āṣir) 2003
- "Abdullah bin Al-Muqaffa, a thinker and a cause" – Dar Al-Fikr 2004
- "Ahmed Al-Safi Al-Najafi His Life From His Poetry" – Bahson Foundation 2006
- "Badr Shaker Al-Sayyab: A Modern Unfinished Model: A Study of Al-Sayyab's Life, Artistic and Poetic Experience" – Bahsoun Foundation 2006
- "The Arab city between two worlds"
- "Literature and Dialogue of Civilizations: Method, Term and Models" – Dar Al-Nahda 2007
- "Globalization, Education, Communication Races, Morphology and Development" 2007
- "Modern Arabic Literature" – (original text: Adab al-'Arabi al-hadith) 1999, 2011
- "Novelist Amin Al-Zawy and the announcements of the unseen" – Dar Al-Nahda – (original text: al-Riwā’ī Amīn al-Zāwī wa-i‘lānāt al-maskūt ‘anh) 2012
- "The role of the Arabic language in building and developing society"
- Values and Communication: Psychology and Curriculum" – Modern Rehab Foundation – 2017

=== Novels ===
- "Indamā tumṭiru al-samā’ ḥanīnan" – dar al-hadatha 2011
- "Kalām ghayr mubāḥ" – Dar Al-Farabi 2016
- "Ṣawāb" – Dar Al-Farabi 2017
- "khafaya" 2018
