= Saleem Gillani =

Pakistani broadcaster, poet (1928–2008)

- Born: 16 May 1928; Gurdaspur, British India
- Died: 25 December 2008 (aged 80); Lahore, Pakistan
- Occupations: Broadcaster, poet, media administrator
- Employer: Radio Pakistan
- Known for: Director general of Radio Pakistan
- Spouse: Alice Serrill Headley (mother of Daood Gillani also known as David Headley)
- Children: 4 (including David Headley also known as Daood Gillani)
- Awards: Hilal-i-Imtiaz (Crescent of Excellence) award by the Government of Pakistan in 2009

Saleem Gillani (16 May 1928 – 25 December 2008) was a Pakistani broadcaster, poet, and media administrator. He worked for Radio Pakistan for nearly four decades, serving in various roles including director general.

He also served as a diplomat at the Embassy of Pakistan, Washington, D.C., although published accounts do not specify his official position. Gillani was the father of David Headley.

== Early life and education ==
Gillani was born on 16 May 1928 in Gurdaspur, Punjab, then part of British India. Following the partition of India in 1947, he migrated to Pakistan with his family. He earned a master's degree in English literature from Government College, Lahore.

== Career ==
Gillani began his professional career in journalism, working with Zamindar newspaper under Maulana Zafar Ali Khan. In 1952, he joined Radio Pakistan in Lahore as a news editor. He later worked for three years with the VOA Urdu service before returning to Pakistan, where he rose through the ranks at Radio Pakistan, eventually serving as director general starting in 1987.

=== Introduced new talent in Pakistani music industry ===
During his service at Radio Pakistan, Gillani introduced the hourly news bulletin, a format that was subsequently adopted as part of the network's regular programming. His poetry, particularly his naat collection "Syedena" was performed by artists such as Farida Khanum, Mehnaz, Arifa Siddiqui and Ustad Nazar Hussain. He also introduced Mehdi Hassan and Reshma to the music industry in Pakistan. Saleem Gillani, as a Radio Pakistan producer, first heard Reshma's mesmerizing singing voice at the Urs (death anniversary ceremony) of 12th-century Sufi saint Lal Shahbaz Qalandar' mausoleum at Sehwan, Sindh, Pakistan and later arranged for a recording session with her at Radio Pakistan.

During his service as head of Radio Pakistan's transcription service, Gillani established the Sound Archive (later referred to as Awaz Khazana) to preserve recordings of music and broadcasts.

He oversaw the production of cultural programming that was translated into multiple languages and distributed abroad, including during national celebrations, when recordings were sent to radio stations in other countries.

According to the newspaper from India, ThePrint, Gillani retired as director of the Pakistan Broadcasting Corporation in 1989.

== Personal life ==
Saleem Gillani was married to American-born Alice Serrill Headley in his youth while living in the United States and had a child with her, named Daood Gillani (also later known as David Headley) in the early 1960s. This marriage suffered a setback, when the family moved to Lahore to settle down. The wife, Alice Headley, took their child David Headley back to the United States with her, when they separated. Saleem Gillani married again in Pakistan and had three more children including another son Danyal Gillani.

== Death ==
Saleem Gillani died of a heart attack on 25 December 2008 in Lahore at age 80. His funeral prayers were held at Jamia Ashrafia, and he was buried in Ichhra cemetery, Lahore, Pakistan.

== Awards and recognition ==
- Hilal-i-Imtiaz (Crescent of Excellence) award by the Government of Pakistan in recognition of his contributions to broadcasting and culture in 2009.
