= Salma Maoulidi =

Tanzanian women's rights activist

- Citizenship: Tanzania
- Occupation: Women Right Activist
- Employer: SahibaSisters Foundation

Salma Maoulidi is a Tanzanian women's rights activist, and the executive director of the SahibaSisters Foundation, Tanzania's first feminist activist institute. The Heinrich Böll Foundation have called her "a public intellectual and social activist with roots in the women's and civil society movement in the region and globally inspired by the promise of freeing human potentials".

== Career ==
Maoulidi was a member of the Tanzanian Constitutional Review Commission, established in 2011, representing the island of Zanzibar.

Maoulidi is the executive director of the SahibaSisters Foundation, Tanzania's first feminist activist institute, which was founded on International Women's Day, 8 March 2017.

Maoulidi is an EASUN associate.

Maoulidi is a member of a "reflection group" on Elections and Political Change in East Africa, co-ordinated by the Institute of African Research and Resource Forum (ARRF).

The Heinrich Böll Foundation have called her "a public intellectual and social activist with roots in the women's and civil society movement in the region and globally inspired by the promise of freeing human potentials".
