= Selima =

Selima may refer to:

== Given name ==
- Selima, a character in the film The Sleeping Dictionary (2003)
- Selima Ahmad (1960–2026), Bangladeshi businessperson and politician
- Selima Hill (born 1945), British poet
- Selima Khatun (born 1982), Indian politician
- Selima Rahman, Bangladeshi politician
- Selima Sfar (born 1977), Tunisian tennis player

== Other ==
- Selima Oasis, an oasis with ancient ruins in the Sudan
- Selima (horse), a Thoroughbred racehorse
- Selima Stakes, an American Thoroughbred horse race
- Selimanosaurus, a nomen nudum of Dicraeosaurus

== See also ==
- Salima (disambiguation)
