= Salim al-Moubayed =

Palestinian historian and writer

Salim 'Arafat Ibrahim Al-Moubayed
- Born: June 1, 1943; Shuja'iyya
- Died: February 28, 2024 (aged 80); Gaza City
- Occupation: Historian
- Writing career
- Language: Arabic

Salim 'Arafat Ibrahim Al-Moubayed (June 1, 1943 – February 28, 2024) (Arabic: سليم عرفات إبراهيم المبيض), was a Palestinian writer and historian. Sometimes referred to as the "Historian of the Gaza Strip," he is considered one of the most prominent contemporary Palestinian and Arab historians.

== Biography ==
Salim Arafat Al-Moubayed was born on June 1, 1943, in the Shuja'iyya neighborhood of Gaza City. He received his primary education at the Shuja'iyya School and completed his secondary education at the Palestine School and the Jaffa School in 1961. He obtained a Bachelor of Geography degree from Ain Shams University in 1965 and a postgraduate diploma from the same university in 1966.

Al-Mubayyid worked as a teacher at Jaffa High School in 1965, then as principal of Al-Karmel High School from 1976 to 1979, and then as an inspector of social studies in the Gaza Strip until the late 1980s. He worked as a part-time lecturer at the Islamic University from 1990 to 1995.

He was founder and secretary-general of the Palestinian National Library. He also contributed to the establishment of the Palestinian Planning Center and the Center for Historical Research.

He died at the age of 80 on February 28, 2024, in Gaza City.

== Bibliography ==
- الجغرافيا الفلكلورية للامثال الشعبية الفلسطينية (The Folklore Geography of Palestinian Proverbs) (1986)
- غزة وقطاعها (Gaza and its Strip) (1987)
- النقود العربية الفلسطينية وسكتها المدنية الأجنبية من القرن السادس قبل الميلاد وحتى عام 1946 (Palestinian Arab Currency and Foreign Civil Mintage from the 6th Century BC until 1946) (1989)
- الحصيدة في التراث الشعبي الفلسطيني (Harvest in Palestinian Folk Heritage) (1990)
- ملامح الشخصية الفلسطينية في أمثالها الشعبية (Features of the Palestinian Personality in its Proverbs) (1990)
- الإبل في التراث الشعبي الفلسطيني (Camels in Palestinian Folk Heritage) (1993)
- البنايات الآثرية الإسلامية في غزة وقطاعها (Islamic Archaeological Buildings in Gaza and its Strip) (1995)
- النصرانية وآثارها في غزة وما حولها (Christianity and its Effects in and around Gaza) (1998)
- النقود الفلسطينية 1927-1946 (Palestinian Currency 1927–1946) (1999)
- وقفية موسى باشا آل رضوان سنة) (1081 هـ. : الأسرة التي حكمت سنجق غزة ومعظم فلسطين قرنا ونصف،) (1530-1681 م. (The Waqf of Musa Pasha Al-Radwan in 1081 AH: The family that ruled the Sanjak of Gaza and most of Palestine for a century and a half, 1530-1681 AD.) (2000)
- حلمي مصباح أبو شعبان : الاديب الشاعر والصحفي الثائر (Helmy Misbah Abu Shaaban: The Writer, Poet, and Revolutionary Journalist) (2004)
- المنطار : ذاتية المكان وكفاح السكان (Al-Muntar: The Identity of Place and the Struggle of its Inhabitants) (2005)
- سعيد علي زين الدين المحامي اثائر والمربي الشاعر، ١٨٩٤-١٩٥٩ م (Said Ali Zein El-Din, lawyer, revolutionary, educator, and poet, 1894-1959 AD) (2011)
- يوميات المجاهد عبد الرحمن محمد الفرا ابو اسعد، رئيس بلدية خان يونس، 1936-1962 (Diaries of the Mujahid Abdul Rahman Muhammad Al-Farra Abu Asaad, Mayor of Khan Yunis, 1936–1962) (2012)
- مكتبة الجامع العمري الكبير بمدينة غزة (The Great Omari Mosque Library in Gaza City) (2013)
- حمدي عبد الرحمن الحسيني : سيرة المناضل الوطني والأديب الصحافي، 1899-1988م (Hamdi Abdel Rahman Al-Husseini: The Biography of the National Fighter and Writer/Journalist, 1899–1988) (2019)
