= Salim Djefaflia =

French footballer (born 1978)

Personal information
- Date of birth: 9 October 1978 (age 48)
- Place of birth: Arles, France
- Height: 1.82 m (6 ft 0 in)
- Position: Striker

Senior career*
Years	Team	Apps	(Gls)
2001–2002	Agde puis Montauban (CFA)		
2002–2003	Spora		
2003–2004	Hannover 96	1	(0)
2004–2005	Holstein Kiel	4	(0)
Total		5	(0)
- * Club domestic league appearances and goals

Salim Djefaflia (born 9 October 1978) is a French former professional footballer who played as a striker. He spent one season in the Bundesliga with Hannover 96.
