= Saleem Arab =

Pakistani footballer (died 2026)

Personal information
- Full name: Muhammad Saleem Arab
- Place of birth: Karachi, Pakistan
- Date of death: 26 February 2026
- Place of death: Karachi, Pakistan
- Position: Midfielder

Youth career
- Baghdad Sports

Senior career*
Years	Team	Apps	(Gls)
- Karachi Port Trust

International career
1987–1993	Pakistan		
- * Club domestic league appearances and goals

Muhammad Saleem Arab (died 26 February 2026), was a Pakistani footballer who played as a midfielder. He played for the Pakistan national team in the 1980s and 1990s.

== Club career ==
Saleem Arab started his youth career with Lyari based Baghdad Sports club. He later represented departmental side Karachi Port Trust in domestic football.

== International career ==
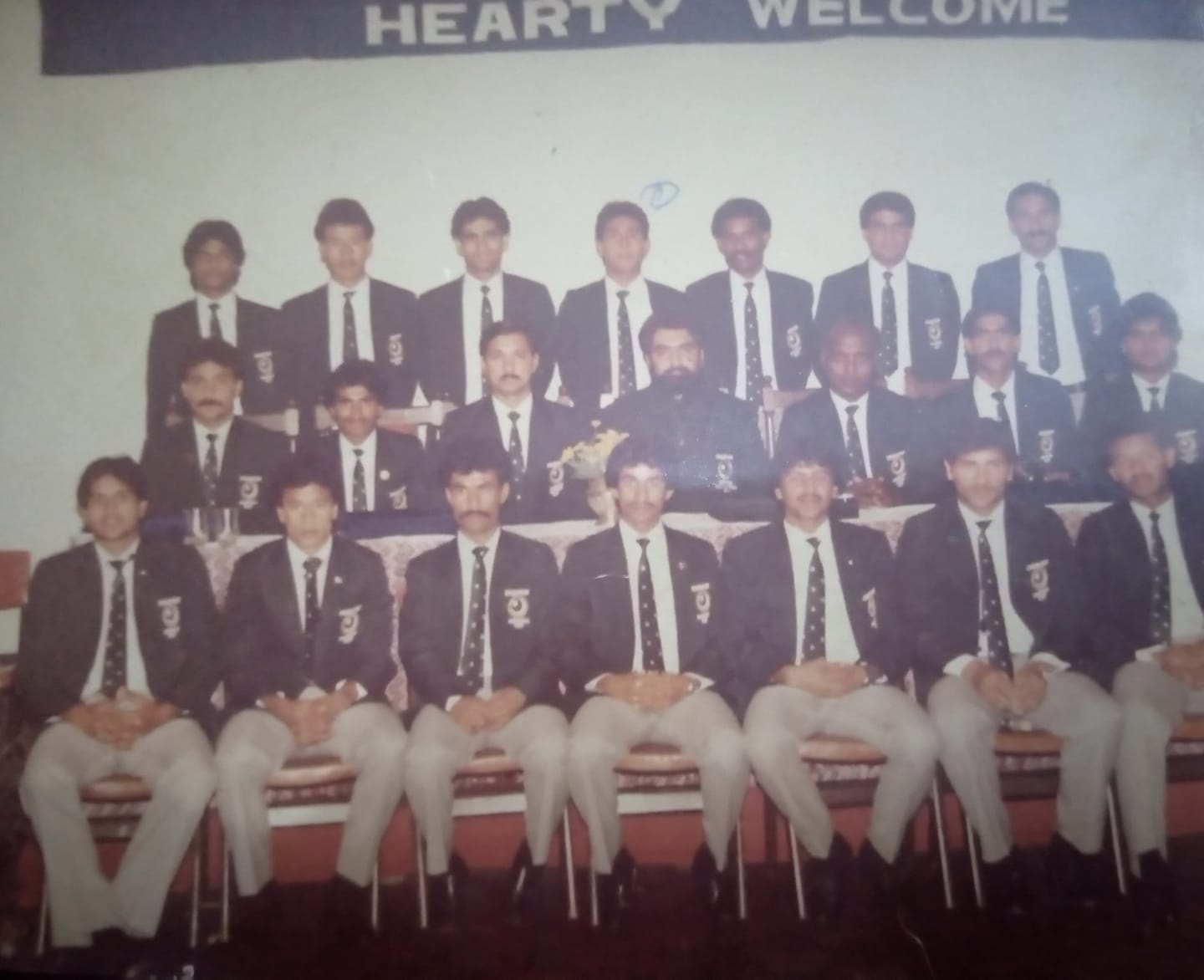
Arab in top row standing third from right to left, with Pakistan in 1987

In 1987, Arab played for the Pakistan national team for the 1988 Summer Olympics qualification against Nepal.

Arab played for the Pakistan national team at the 1994 FIFA World Cup qualification in 1993, where he made two appearances against China and Jordan.

== Post-retirement ==
After retirement as player, Arab served as football coach for youth players in Pakistan.

== Personal life ==
Saleem's brothers Javed Arab and Nasir Arab also played as footballers.

== Death ==
Arab died on 26 February 2026.
