= Sizwe Mabizela =

Vice-chancellor of Rhodes University
- Incumbent
- Assumed office November 2014
- Preceded by: Saleem Badat

Deputy Vice-chancellor: Academic & Student Affairs of Rhodes University
- In office 2008 – October 2014

Personal details
- Education: University of Fort Hare; Pennsylvania State University
- Profession: Professor

Sizwe Mabizela is a South African mathematician who became vice-chancellor of Rhodes University in 2014. He previously served as deputy vice-chancellor: academic and student affairs.
