= Salim Raj =

Indian politician

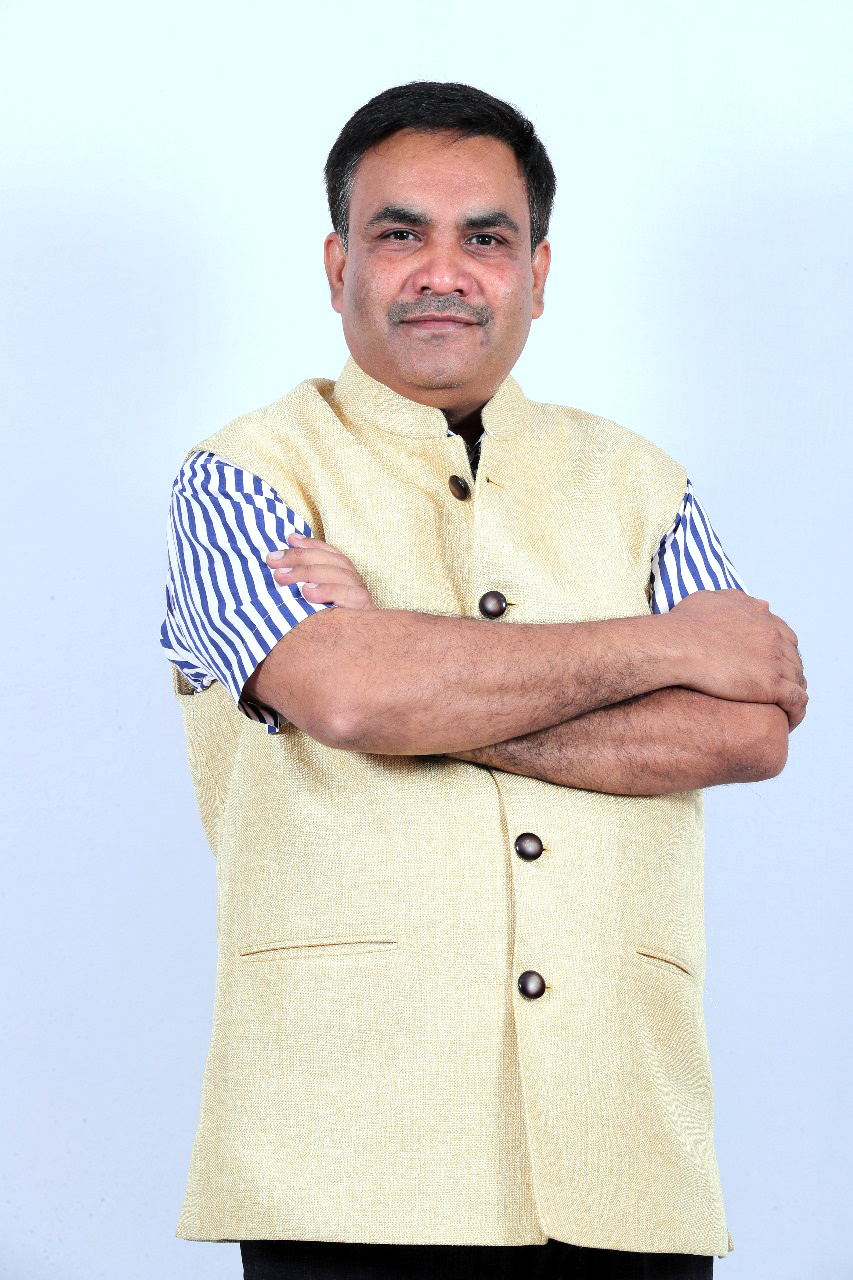

Cabinet Minister, Government of Chhattisgarh
- Incumbent
- Assumed office January 2025
- Chief Minister: Vishnu Deo Sai

Chairman, Chhattisgarh Waqf Board
- Incumbent
- Assumed office January 2025

Personal details
- Born: Indore, Madhya Pradesh
- Party: Bharatiya Janata Party
- Spouse: Reshma Raj
- Children: 3
- Profession: Agriculture and Business

Salim Raj is an Indian politician and serves as a Cabinet Minister in the Government of Chhattisgarh. He holds the position of Chairman of the Chhattisgarh State Waqf Board. He is also the State In-Charge of the BJP's Minority Morcha in Chhattisgarh.

== Political career ==
Salim Raj joined the Bharatiya Janata Party in 1992 and held various positions within the BJP Minority Morcha before being appointed to the BJP's leading body in 2004. In 2010, he served as the National Treasurer of the BJP Minority Morcha. From 2011 to 2014, he was a member of the Haj Committee of India, where he coordinated pilgrimage services and welfare programs for Haj pilgrims at both the state and national levels. He also played a significant role in the Muslim Rashtriya Manch, a national forum affiliated with the BJP.

Raj was appointed as State President, BJP Minority Cell in 2016. And in 2021, he became a Member of the BJP State Executive Committee & State In-Charge, BJP Minority Morcha. He was the Chairman of the Chhattisgarh State Haj Committee (State Minister Status), under the government of Raman Singh. During this position, he has spearheaded initiatives in education, economic development, and social harmony across Chhattisgarh.

In 2025, He was elected as Chairman of the Chhattisgarh State Waqf Board. And in January 2025, he became the Cabinet Minister in the Vishnu Deo Sai ministry.

== Waqf Amendment Act (2025) ==
Raj endorsed the central government's The Waqf (Amendment) Act, 2025, as a transformative step to recover encroached Waqf assets and empower minority communities. Highlighting that about 85% of Waqf land in Chhattisgarh was illegally occupied, he stressed the need for legal clarity and institutional transparency.

== Friday sermons ==
Raj introduced a policy requiring prior approval for sermon content in 1,822 mosques across the state, aimed at curbing political messaging within religious platforms. This decision drew both support and criticism, with opponents citing religious freedom concerns.

To prevent political sermons, he established a vetting system via WhatsApp groups for mosque sermons—covering over 1,800 mosques—and mandated prior content approval.

== Nikah ceremony charges ==
In June 2025, Raj capped fees for mosque officials conducting Nikah ceremonies at ₹1,100, seeking to make the event affordable for economically challenged families. He warned that violations would draw official action.

== Threats and security ==
Following his policies regulating mosque discourse, Raj received reported death threats from sources in Pakistan, Afghanistan, and Kerala. He filed a police complaint, leading to ongoing investigations.
