= Salma Hareb =

Emirati businesswoman

Salma Ali Saif Bin Hareb (born 1965) is an Emirati business executive. She was the chief executive officer of Jebel Ali Free Zone and of Economic Zones World from 2005 to 2015. In 2008, Hareb was ranked number one in Forbes Arabia's list of the 50 most powerful Arab businesswomen of 2008. She is the first woman in the Middle East and North Africa to be appointed head of an economic free zone. She has been a non-executive director of NMC Health PLC since 2014.

In 2014, Forbes ranked her as the third most powerful Arab woman.

Since 2005, Hareb was CEO of Economic Zones World Corp, until succeeded by Mohammed Al Muallem in 2015.
