= Saleem Ali (politician) =

Mohamed Saleem Ali (މުހަންމަދު ސަލީމް އަލީ ) (died 25 December 2007), commonly referred to in the Maldives as Sto, Saleem, was a Parliament member of the Maldivian Democratic Party, elected for president in Huvadhu Atoll with high popularity. Due to his criticism of the dictator Gayoom, over the years he was arrested and sentenced several times.

Saleem, best known for organizing protests against President Gayoom's visits to the MDP heartlands in the south of the country, was a prominent figure within the Maldives' main opposition party. "Mr. Saleem Ali's passing away causes deep sorrow to all who knew him," said a party statement. "A tireless campaigner for reform [Mr Saleem] will be indelible in the party's records as well as the country's history."
