= Salim Al-Hassani =

Iraqi mechanical engineer

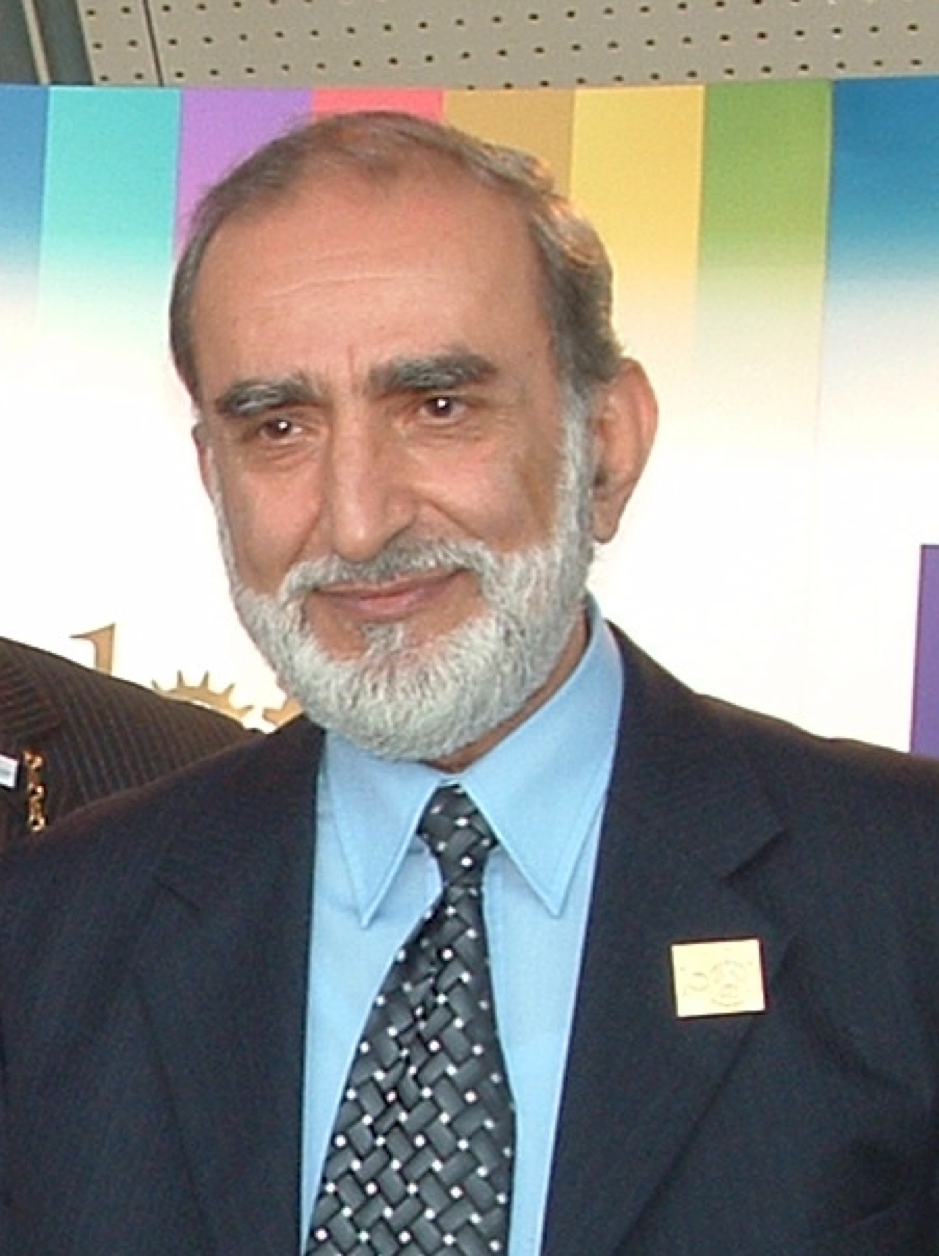
Salim Al Hassani.

Salim T. S. Al-Hassani (Arabic: سليم الحسني) is Emeritus Professor of Mechanical Engineering and currently an Honorary Professorial Fellow at the Faculty of Humanities at the University of Manchester. He is President of the Foundation of Science, Technology and Civilisation (FSTC), founder of the academic portal www.MuslimHeritage.com; and Chief Editor of the 1001 Inventions touring exhibition, built as a global education initiative which includes a book, award winning film and teacher’s pack.

== Biography ==
Salim Al-Hassani was raised in Baghdad, but has lived, studied and worked in the UK since the early 1960s. He became Professor of Mechanical Engineering at University of Manchester Institute of Science and Technology (UMIST) in 1991 and was an acknowledged world expert in the decommissioning of offshore installations and in major plant-related accident investigations. He also researched into, and is widely published on, the computational modeling of biomedical processes.

Since 1968, Professor Al-Hassani, has published over 200 papers in international journals and books. He has supervised 40 PhD students, 50 MSc students and numerous post-doctoral fellows from all parts of the world and holds patents on engineering.

Over the past 25 years Al-Hassani’s interest has turned to promoting the cultural roots of science as a platform for community cohesion, intercultural appreciation and world peace.

Al-Hassani is now an Emeritus Professor of Mechanical Engineering and an Honorary Professorial Fellow at the School of Languages, Linguistics and Cultures, Faculty of Humanities at the University of Manchester.

== Work on Muslim heritage ==
Al-Hassani established, and is Honorary President of, the Foundation for Science Technology and Civilisation, UK (FSTC Ltd). Through FSTC his work promoting the cultural roots of science, and especially that of the Muslim Civilisation, has spread across the globe with initiatives such as www.muslimheritage.com and the 1001 Inventions global education initiative and more recently the "1001 Cures" project on Medicine and Healthcare from Muslim Civilisation out of which a major work, edited by Prof. Peter Pormann, was launched at the Royal Society, in March 2018.

He made his mark by utilising applied modern engineering analysis to recreate, in virtual 3D space, ancient machines, especially those invented during the Golden Age such as the machines of Al-Jazari and Taqi al-Din.

Al-Hassani has authored and edited more than 300 publications on Muslim Heritage, including the book 1001 Inventions: The Enduring Legacy of Muslim Civilisation(Published by National Geographic with a forward from Prince Charles). This book is considered to be essential reading for all those interested to learn about the role of Muslim inventions in today’s schools, universities, homes, hospitals, markets, cities, world and universe. This has recently been updated as a text only annotated edition as an eBook.

Al-Hassani is a speaker on the Muslim contribution to building the foundations of modern civilisation delivering more than 150 lectures at national and international venues. These include a keynote speech entitled Learning from the Past to Design the Future delivered at the Intellectual Capital Conference organized by the World Bank in Paris; 1000 years Amnesia and the Identity Crisis at the UK Parliament in London, Muslim Heritage and Education presented to the Education and Culture Committee of the EU Parliament in Brussels on 5 November 2008 and Strategic Importance of Muslim Heritage in our World and its Impact on Diplomatic, Educational and Socio-Economic Developments given at the exhibition on Multi-Faith Scientists in Islamic Civilization organized by the FSTC at the United Nations, New York, 12–14 November 2008.

These initiatives have been successful in promoting greater cohesion, respect and understanding between faiths and cultures. Their major value is not only in closing the gap between Muslims and non-Muslims in the UK and worldwide, but also in promoting the concept of scientific and technological innovation as a positive and constructive channel for the personal expression of belief, as an alternative to religious isolationism and extremism and more particularly in facilitating greater understanding of the past positive role of Muslim women in society with particular emphasis on their participation in science, technology, art and culture. Furthermore, it reveals a past when Muslims, Christians, Jews, Sabians and others worked closely together and in harmony to develop society.

== Awards and nominations ==
In 1989, he was elected to membership of the Manchester Literary and Philosophical Society

In 2001, Professor Salim T S Al-Hassani received the Fazlur Rahman Khan award for excellence in engineering, science and technology.

In September 2009, Professor Salim T S Al-Hassani was granted an Honorary Fellowship of the British Association for the Advancement of Science, now the British Science Association for his work to promote the scientific and technological achievements within Muslim cultures. The Honorary Fellowship of the British Science Association is a distinguished honour, conferred to date on about 90 people.

In February 2009, Professor Salim T S Al-Hassani was presented the Building Bridges Award by the Association of Muslim Social Scientists.

From 2015 to 2025, he was named, each year, amongst the 500 most influential Muslims (Science and Technology) in the world.

== Selected bibliography ==
- "Dynamic plastic buckling of tubes subject to radial magnetomotive forces." J. Mech. Eng. Sc. 16, No. 2, 59-70, April, 1974
- "A Morphological Elastic Model of General Hexagonal Columnar Structures", Int J Mech Sci, Vol. 43, No. 4, pp 1027–1060, April 2001
- 1001 inventions : Muslim heritage in our world, Foundation for Science Technology and Civilisation (FSTC), 2006
- 1001 Inventions : the enduring legacy of Muslim civilization, National Geographic, 2012
- The Corpus of al-Isfizārī in the Sciences of Weights and Mechanical Devices by Abū Ḥātim al-Muẓaffar ibn Ismāʿīl al-Isfizārī, Al-Furqan, 2015
- The Journey of Automatic Machines in Muslim Civilisation, Keynote lecture at the Int.Symposium on Al- Jazarî, University of Mardin, 13–14 May 2016
- Digital Light & Codebreakers, Keynote lecture at Bletchley Park, Milton Keynes, 7 March 2020. (Link)
- Early Women of Science, Technology, Medicine and Management, Keynote lecture at World Muslim Women's Summit, organised by TASAM, Istanbul, 28 Feb - 4 March 2018. https://muslimheritage.com/early-women-of-science/
- 1001 Inventions: the enduring legacy of Muslim civilisation, 4th edition Annotated text only eBook, FSTC, 2018. Full text
