= Saleem Ali (academic) =

Pakistani American Australian academic (born 1973)

Saleem H. Ali FRSA FRGS
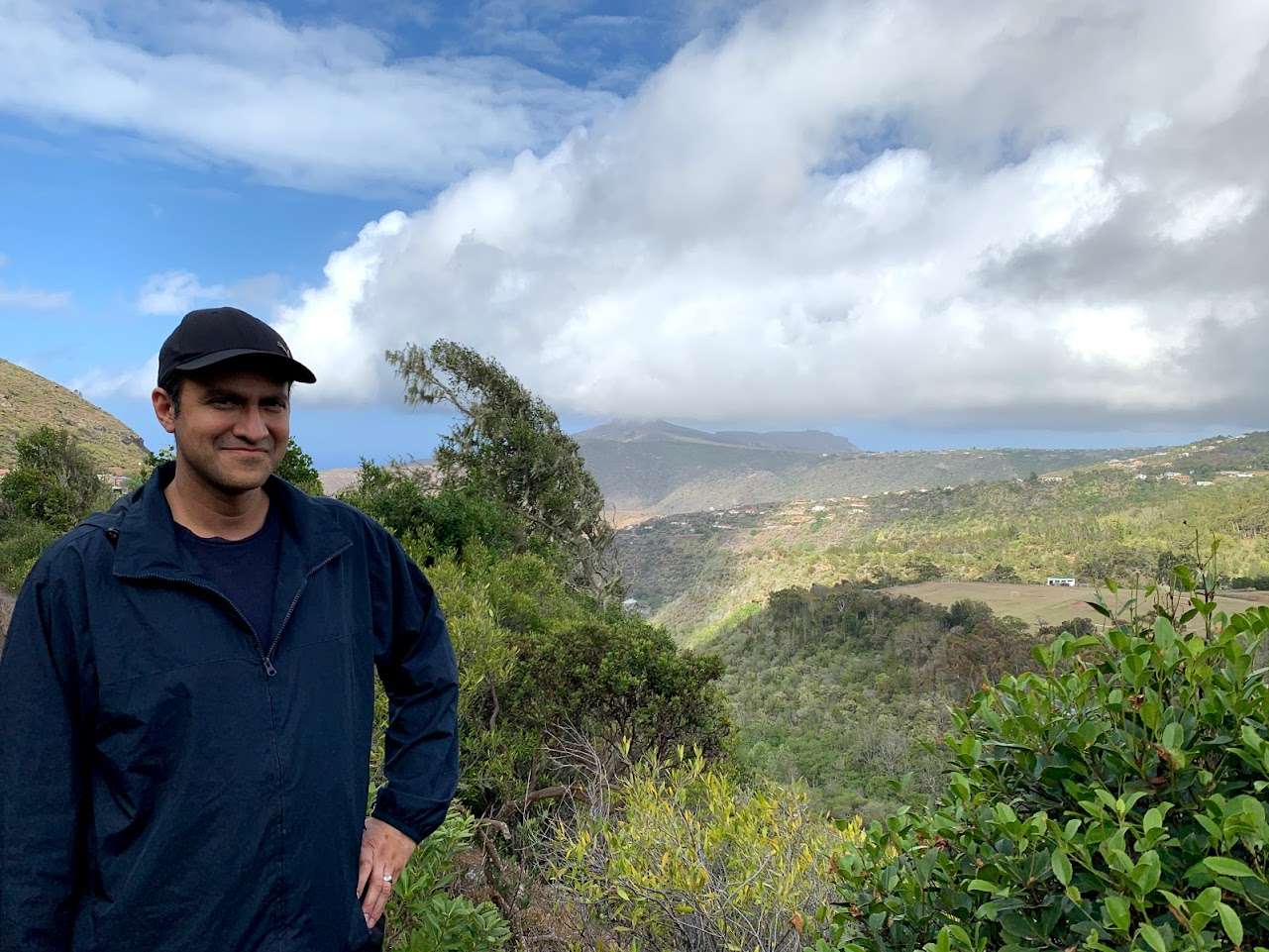
- Professor Ali during a visit to St. Helena Island in January 2020
- Born: 1973 (age 52–53); New Bedford, Massachusetts, U.S.
- Board member of: Adventure Scientists
- Awards: Young Global Leader; National Geographic Society Emerging Explorer Award; Elected member of United Nations International Resource Panel;Member of the Scientific and Technical Advisory Panel of the Global Environment Facility; Fellow of the Royal Society of Arts (FRSA); Fellow of the Royal Geographical Society (FRGS); Fellow of the Explorers Club; Bellagio Residency with the Rockefeller Foundation; Martin Green Fellowship UNSW; Alexander von Humboldt Research Award

Academic background
- Education: Massachusetts Institute of Technology (Ph.D.); Yale University (M.S.); Tufts University (B.S.)

Saleem H. Ali (born 1973) is a Pakistani American Australian academic who is the Blue and Gold Distinguished Professor of Energy and the Environment at the University of Delaware. He has also held the chair in Sustainable Resources Development at the University of Queensland in Brisbane Australia where he retains affiliation as an Honorary Professor and is serving as a Martin Green Fellow at UNSW in Sydney (2026-2028). He is also Lead for Critical Minerals at the United Nations University at their Institute for Water Enironment and Health. Previously he was Professor of Environmental Studies at the University of Vermont's Rubenstein School of Natural Resources, and the founding director of the Institute for Environmental Diplomacy and Security as well as a Fellow at the Gund Institute. He has collaborated on environmental and social impact assessment research on deep sea mining using Life Cycle Analysis techniques to assist policy-makers in small-island developing states, Nauru, Cook Islands, Kiribati and Tonga, who are considering such investments under the auspices of the International Seabed Authority

Having visited more than 175 countries and all continents (including Antarctica), he is known for his work on environmental conflict resolution, particularly in the extractive industries and was profiled in Forbes magazine in September, 2009 as "The Alchemist." His book "Treasures of the Earth: Need Greed and a Sustainable Future" (Yale University Press, October, 2009) received a cover endorsement by Nobel Peace laureate Muhammad Yunus for providing a " welcome linkage between environmental behavior and poverty alleviation.", and his book Earthly Order received a cover endorsement from Nobel Chemistry Laureate Roald Hoffmann. In May 2010, he was also chosen by National Geographic as an "emerging explorer" with a profile appearing in the June 2010 issue of National Geographic Magazine. In March 2011, he was also selected by the World Economic Forum as a "Young Global Leader." He serves on the board of Adventure Scientists, Mediators Beyond Borders International and RESOLVE.

== Research Work ==
Dr. Ali's research focuses on integrative approaches to achieving planetary sustainability through technical and social mechanisms. In particular, he has studied the causes and consequences of multiscale environmental conflicts between industry, communities and government and how ecological factors can promote peace. He has previously served on the faculty of Brown University’s Watson Institute for International Studies and on the visiting faculty for the United Nations University for Peace (Costa Rica). Much of his empirical research has focused on environmental conflicts in the mineral sector. In September 2007, he was chosen as one of eight "revolutionary minds" by Seed magazine.

Professor Ali was elected to the United Nations International Resource Panel in 2017 and to the Science Panel of the Global Environment Facility in 2018, and is also a member of the World Commission on Protected areas and the IUCN Taskforce on Transboundary Conservation. Earlier in his career he was involved in promoting environmental education in madrasahs and using techniques from environmental planning to study the rise of these institutions in his ethnic homeland of Pakistan, under a grant from the United States Institute of Peace. In much of his research efforts, Dr. Ali involves a multi-media component, often involving his students in making video documentaries of their empirical work. From 2005 to 2008, he received two grants from the Tiffany & Co. Foundation to investigate the environmental and social impact of gemstone and gold mining. He also completed a report on oil and gas pipelines as a source of cooperation that was researched while based at the Brookings Institution research center in Doha, Qatar in 2009. His report on "Ecological Cooperation in South Asia" was launched in Washington at an event hosted by Peter Bergen in January 2013. Subsequently, he has also contributed to science diplomacy anthologies pertaining to South Asia for the Stimson Center and The Middle East Institute.

Professor Ali's research appointments have included, a Baker Foundation Research Fellowship at Harvard Business School, a Bellagio Residency with the Rockefeller Foundation and a parliamentary internship at the British House of Commons. He has taught courses on environmental planning, conflict resolution, industrial ecology, research methods and technical writing (he received the Kristen Finnegan Prize for tutoring MIT students in writing skills in 1999) and has been is actively involved in online learning platforms such as EdX (through Columbia University's Center for Sustainable Investment). In 2025 he was selected for the Hanse-Wissenschaftskolleg Institute for Advanced Study Fellowship in Germany and also received the Alexander von Humboldt Research Award in Berlin in June 2026.

Prior to embarking on an academic career, Dr. Ali worked as an environmental health and safety professional at General Electric. He also served as a consultant for the Environmental Protection Agency, Fish and Wildlife Service, and Health Canada. Yet other of his projects included a mining impact prospectus for the Crow Nation and research assistance to Cultural Survival.

He has also served as a Senior Fellow of the Foreign Policy Research Institute and is currently a Senior Fellow with Delphi Global. During the COVID pandemic, he collaborated with film-maker Alex Tyson to produce and screen-write a short film on the hidden materials behind the infrastructure needed to work from home titled "Material Zoom" which was profiled by the United Nations Environment Programme. His TED Talk on the idea of a Minerals Trust for the Green Transition was featured by the Rockefeller Foundation in their "Big Bets" series.

== Education ==
Professor Ali earned a doctorate in environmental planning from the Massachusetts Institute of Technology, where his doctoral committee was chaired by Lawrence Susskind. He received a master's degree (M.E.S.) with a focus in environmental law and policy from Yale University, (thesis advisor Daniel C. Esty), and a bachelor's degree in chemistry from Tufts University. He did his secondary schooling at Aitchison College Lahore, Pakistan with primary schooling at the Friends Academy and the Job. S. Gidley School in North Dartmouth, Massachusetts.

== Personal life ==
Saleem Ali was born to Pakistani immigrant parents, who came to America from Lahore, Pakistan in 1971. His father Dr. Shaukat Ali (1923-2003) was a Professor of Political Science at the University of Massachusetts (Dartmouth Campus) and his mother, Dr. Parveen Shaukat Ali (born 1933), served as Vice Principal of Forman Christian College in Lahore, Pakistan. He has two sisters, Irfana Qadir (married to Basharat Qadir, the son of the former foreign minister of Pakistan, Manzur Qadir), and the Canadian writer and activist Farzana Hassan. In public interviews he has noted that his parents had very different backgrounds and personalities. His mother came from an upper-middle-income family with Afghan heritage (Syeds from Herat) while his father was a first-generation school-goer from an impoverished Punjabi family in Lahore. Thanks to a scholarship from the Ford Foundation his father was able to get higher studies at The University of Southern California while his mother attended Stanford University. In the dedication of his first book he notes: "to my mother who taught me the virtue of principled confrontation and to my father from whom I learned the value of pragmatic conciliation.". Saleem Ali's wife Maria (Kashmiri) a psychologist by training and the daughter of the former headmaster of Aitchison College Saleem Kashmiri and the sister of Pakistani-American artist Amr Kashmiri. The couple have two sons Dr. Shahmir Ali, a public health professional, and Shahroze Ali, a hydrologist for the State of Delaware.

== Bibliography ==
- Mining, the environment, and indigenous development conflicts, Saleem H. Ali, University of Arizona Press, 2003, ISBN 978-0-8165-2312-2
- Peace Parks: Conservation and Conflict Resolution, Saleem H. Ali ed. MIT Press, 2007, ISBN 978-0-262-51198-8
- Earth Matters: Indigenous People, The Extractive Industries and Corporate Social Responsibility, Ciaran O’Faircheallaigh and Saleem Ali eds. Greenleaf Publications, 2008, ISBN 978-1-906093-16-7
- Islam and Education: Conflict and Conformity in Pakistan's Madrassahs, Saleem H. Ali, Oxford University Press, 2009, ISBN 978-0-19-547672-9
- Treasures of the Earth: Need, Greed and a Sustainable Future, Saleem H. Ali, Yale University Press, 2009, ISBN 978-0-300-14161-0
- Environmental Diplomacy: Negotiating More Effective Global Agreements, Lawrence Susskind and Saleem H. Ali, Oxford University Press, 2014, ISBN 978-0-199-39797-6
- Diplomacy on Ice: Energy and the Environment in the Arctic and Antarctic Rebecca Pincus and Saleem H. Ali eds., Yale University Press, 2015, ISBN 978-0-300-20516-9
- Africa's Mineral Fortune Saleem H. Ali, Kathryn Sturman and Nina Collins eds., Routledge, 2018 ISBN 9781138606920
- Earthly Order: How Natural Laws Define Human Life Saleem H. Ali, Oxford University Press, 2022 ISBN 9780197640272
- Soil to Foil: Aluminum and the Quest for Industrial Sustainability Saleem H. Ali, Columbia University Press, 2023 ISBN 9780231555562
- Google Scholar Citations of Peer-reviewed articles by Saleem H. Ali
