= List of Thymus species =

The following species in the flowering plant genus Thymus, the thymes, are accepted by Plants of the World Online. Thymus is considered a well‑defined genus within its family as its species have consistent chemical and morphological characters.

== Species ==
- Thymus adamovicii Velen.
- Thymus × aitanae Mateo, M.B.Crespo & E.Laguna
- Thymus alatauensis (Klokov & Des.-Shost.) Klokov
- Thymus albicans Hoffmanns. & Link
- Thymus × alcarazii Pedauyé, Perales & P.P.Ferrer
- Thymus alfredae Post
- Thymus algeriensis Boiss. & Reut.
- Thymus × almeriensis G.López & R.Morales
- Thymus × almijarensis Ruíz Torre & Ruíz Cast.
- Thymus alpestris (Celak.) Tausch ex A.Kern.
- Thymus altaicus Klokov & Des.-Shost.
- Thymus alternans Klokov
- Thymus amurensis Klokov
- Thymus antoninae Rouy & Coincy
- Thymus × aragonensis Mateo, M.B.Crespo & N.E.Mercadal
- Thymus × arcanus G.López & R.Morales
- Thymus × arcuatus R.Morales
- Thymus × arenarius Bernh. ex Rchb.
- Thymus argaeus (Fisch. & C.A.Mey.) Boiss. & Balansa
- Thymus × armuniae R.Morales
- Thymus arsenijevii Klokov
- Thymus artvinicus Ponert
- Thymus × arundanus Willk.
- Thymus × athous Ronniger
- Thymus atlanticus (Ball) Pau
- Thymus atticus Celak.
- Thymus aznavourii Velen.
- Thymus baeticus Boiss. ex Lacaita
- Thymus baicalensis Serg.
- Thymus bashkiriensis Klokov & Des.-Shost.
- Thymus × beltraniae Socorro, Espinar & Arrebola
- Thymus × benitorum Mateo, Mercadal & Pisco
- Thymus × bermius Ronniger
- Thymus bihoriensis Jalas
- Thymus bivalens (Mayol, L.Sáez & Rosselló) Camarda
- Thymus bleicherianus Pomel
- Thymus boissieri Halácsy
- Thymus bornmuelleri Velen.
- Thymus borysthenicus Klokov & Des.-Shost.
- Thymus × borzygis Mateo & M.B.Crespo
- Thymus bovei Benth.
- Thymus × brachychaetus (Willk.) Cout.
- Thymus brachychilus Jalas
- Thymus bracteatus Lange ex Cutanda
- Thymus bracteosus Vis. ex Benth.
- Thymus × bractichina R.Morales
- Thymus × braunii Borbás
- Thymus brevipetiolatus Cáp
- Thymus broussonetii Boiss.
- Thymus bulgaricus (Domin & Podp.) Ronniger
- Thymus × bulsanensis (Ronniger) Machule
- Thymus caespititius Brot.
- Thymus calcareus Klokov & Des.-Shost.
- Thymus callieri Borbás ex Velen.
- Thymus camphoratus Hoffmanns. & Link
- Thymus canoviridis Jalas
- Thymus capitellatus Hoffmanns. & Link
- Thymus cappadocicus Boiss.
- Thymus cariensis Hub.-Mor. & Jalas
- Thymus carmanicus Jalas
- Thymus carnosus Boiss.
- Thymus × carrionii F.Sáez & Sánchez Gómez
- Thymus catharinae Camarda
- Thymus × celtibericus Pau
- Thymus chamarensis Vasjukov
- Thymus cherlerioides Vis.
- Thymus cilicicus Boiss. & Balansa
- Thymus × cimicinus Blum ex Ledeb.
- Thymus × citriodorus (Pers.) Schreb.
- Thymus collinus M.Bieb.
- Thymus comosus Heuff. ex Griseb. & Schenk
- Thymus comptus Friv.
- Thymus convolutus Klokov
- Thymus coriifolius Ronniger
- Thymus crebrifolius Klokov
- Thymus × cremnophilus Káp
- Thymus crenulatus Klokov
- Thymus curtus Klokov
- Thymus × czorsztynensis Pawl.
- Thymus dacicus Borbás
- Thymus daenensis Celak.
- Thymus daghestanicus Klokov & Des.-Shost.
- Thymus dahuricus Serg.
- Thymus decussatus Benth.
- Thymus degenii Heinr.Braun
- Thymus desjatovae Ronniger
- Thymus × diazii Alcaraz, Rivas Mart. & Sánchez-Gómez
- Thymus didukhii V.M.Ostapko
- Thymus diminutus Klokov
- Thymus × dimorphus Klokov & Des.-Shost.
- Thymus disjunctus Klokov
- Thymus dmitrievae Gamajun.
- Thymus doerfleri Ronniger
- Thymus dolomiticus H.J.Coste
- Thymus dolopicus Formánek
- Thymus dreatensis Batt.
- Thymus dubjanskyi Klokov & Des.-Shost.
- Thymus dzalindensis Prob.
- Thymus dzevanovskyi Klokov & Des.-Shost.
- Thymus eigii (Zohary & P.H.Davis) Jalas
- Thymus ekimii Yild.
- Thymus elegans Serg.
- Thymus elenevskyi Vasjukov
- Thymus × eliasii Sennen & Pau
- Thymus elisabethae Klokov & Des.-Shost.
- Thymus embergeri Roussine
- Thymus × enicensis Blanca, Cueto, L.Gut. & M.J.Martínez
- Thymus eravinensis Serg.
- Thymus eremita Klokov
- Thymus eriocalyx (Ronniger) Jalas
- Thymus evenkiensis Byczenn.
- Thymus extremus Klokov
- Thymus fallax Fisch. & C.A.Mey.
- Thymus × faustinoi Sánchez-Gómez, López Esp., Sánchez Saorín & R.Mora
- Thymus fedtschenkoi Ronniger
- Thymus flabellatus Klokov
- Thymus fontqueri (Jalas) Molero & Rovira
- Thymus funkii Coss.
- Thymus × genesianus Galán Cela
- Thymus × georgicus Ronniger
- Thymus glabricaulis Klokov
- Thymus gobi-altaicus (N.Ulziykh.) Kamelin & A.L.Budantsev
- Thymus gobicus Czern.
- Thymus granatensis Boiss.
- Thymus groenlandicus Klokov
- Thymus guberlinensis Iljin
- Thymus × guerrae F.Sáez & Sánchez Gómez
- Thymus guyonii de Noé
- Thymus hartvigii R.Morales
- Thymus haussknechtii Velen.
- Thymus helendzhicus Klokov & Des.-Shost.
- Thymus × henriquesii Pau
- Thymus × henryi Ronniger
- Thymus herba-barona Loisel.
- Thymus × hieronymi Sennen
- Thymus hohenackeri Klokov
- Thymus holosericeus Celak.
- Thymus × hybridus Ronniger
- Thymus hyemalis Lange
- Thymus × ibericus Sennen & Pau
- Thymus iljinii Klokov & Des.-Shost.
- Thymus inaequalis Klokov
- Thymus incertus Klokov
- Thymus × indalicus Blanca, Cueto, L.Gut. & M.J.Martínez
- Thymus indigirkensis Karav.
- Thymus integer Griseb.
- Thymus jalasianus Stoyanov & Marinov
- Thymus jankae Celak.
- Thymus japonicus (H.Hara) Kitag.
- Thymus jenisseensis Iljin
- Thymus × jimenezii Socorro, Arrebola & Espinar
- Thymus × josephi-angeli Mansanet & Aguil.
- Thymus jurtzevii Vasjukov
- Thymus kamelinii Vasjukov
- Thymus karamarianicus Klokov & Des.-Shost.
- Thymus karatavicus Dmitrieva
- Thymus karavaevii Doronkin
- Thymus karjaginii Grossh.
- Thymus kimishepensis Klokov
- Thymus kirgisorum Dubj.
- Thymus koeieanus Ronniger
- Thymus komarovii Serg.
- Thymus kondratjukii V.M.Ostapko
- Thymus × korneckii Machule
- Thymus kosteleckyanus Opiz
- Thymus kotschyanus Boiss. & Hohen.
- Thymus krylovii Byczenn.
- Thymus lacaitae Pau
- Thymus laconicus Jalas
- Thymus ladjanuricus Kem.-Nath.
- Thymus × lainzii Sánchez-Gómez, S.Fernández Jimenez & F.Sáez
- Thymus lanceolatus Desf.
- Thymus lavrenkoanus Klokov
- Thymus lenensis Vasjukov
- Thymus leptophyllus Lange
- Thymus leucospermus Hartvig
- Thymus leucostomus Hausskn. & Velen.
- Thymus leucotrichus Halácsy
- Thymus levitskyi Prob.
- Thymus linearis Benth.
- Thymus × littoralis Klokov & Des.-Shost.
- Thymus longedentatus (Degen & Urum.) Ronniger
- Thymus longicaulis C.Presl
- Thymus longiflorus Boiss.
- Thymus loscosii Willk.
- Thymus lotocephalus G.López & R.Morales
- Thymus magnificus Klokov
- Thymus majkopiensis Klokov & Des.-Shost.
- Thymus mandschuricus Ronniger
- Thymus marandensis Jamzad
- Thymus markhotensis Maleev
- Thymus maroccanus Ball
- Thymus × martinezii Pau
- Thymus mastichina (L.) L.
- Thymus × mastichinalis Sánchez-Gómez & F.Sáez
- Thymus mastigophorus Lacaita
- Thymus membranaceus Boiss.
- Thymus × mercadalii Mateo & Pisco
- Thymus michaelis Kamelin & A.L.Budantsev
- Thymus migricus Klokov & Des.-Shost.
- Thymus minussinensis Serg.
- Thymus × mixtus Pau
- Thymus moldavicus Klokov & Des.-Shost.
- Thymus mongolicus (Ronniger) Ronniger
- Thymus × monrealensis Pau ex R.Morales
- Thymus × monteilii Sennen ex Machule
- Thymus × moralesii Mateo & M.B.Crespo
- Thymus moroderi Pau ex Martínez
- Thymus × mourae Paiva & Salgueiro
- Thymus mugodzharicus Klokov & Des.-Shost.
- Thymus munbyanus Boiss. & Reut.
- Thymus musilii Velen.
- Thymus nakhodkensis Gorovoj & Dudkin
- Thymus narymensis Serg.
- Thymus nerczensis Klokov
- Thymus nervosus J.Gay ex Willk.
- Thymus nervulosus Klokov
- Thymus neurophyllus (Rech.f.) R.Morales
- Thymus nitens Lamotte
- Thymus × novocastellanus Mateo, M.B.Crespo & Pisco
- Thymus novograblenovii Prob.
- Thymus numidicus Poir.
- Thymus nummularius M.Bieb.
- Thymus × nuriensis Sennen & Pau
- Thymus × oblongifolius Opiz
- Thymus ochotensis Klokov
- Thymus odoratissimus Mill.
- Thymus oehmianus Ronniger & Soska
- Thymus oenipontanus Heinr.Braun ex Borbás
- Thymus origanoides Webb & Berthel.
- Thymus oriolanus M.Fabregat & M.B.Crespo
- Thymus orospedanus Villar
- Thymus osseticus Vasjukov
- Thymus pallasianus Heinr.Braun
- Thymus pallescens de Noé
- Thymus pallidus Coss. ex Batt.
- Thymus pannonicus All.
- Thymus × paradoxus Rouy
- Thymus parnassicus Halácsy
- Thymus paronychioides Celak.
- Thymus pastoralis Iljin
- Thymus × pastoris Socorro & Arrebola
- Thymus pavlovii Serg.
- Thymus pectinatus Fisch. & C.A.Mey.
- Thymus perinicus (Velen.) Jalas
- Thymus persicus (Ronniger ex Rech.f.) Jalas
- Thymus petraeus Serg.
- Thymus phyllopodus Klokov
- Thymus picentinus (Lacaita) Bartolucci
- Thymus piperella L.
- Thymus plasonii Adamovic
- Thymus × porcii Borbás
- Thymus praecox Opiz
- Thymus probatovae Vasjukov
- Thymus proximus Serg.
- Thymus × pseudoalpestris Ronniger ex Nachychko
- Thymus pseudocollinus (Menitsky) Vasjukov
- Thymus × pseudogranatensis Vizoso, F.B.Navarro & Lorite
- Thymus × pseudograniticus Klokov & Des.-Shost.
- Thymus pseudohirsutus Klokov
- Thymus × pseudostepposus Klokov
- Thymus × pseudothracicus Ronniger
- Thymus pubescens Boiss. & Kotschy ex Celak.
- Thymus pulchellus C.A.Mey.
- Thymus pulcherrimus Schur
- Thymus pulegioides L.
- Thymus pulvinatus Celak.
- Thymus punctulosus Klokov
- Thymus purpureoviolaceus Byczenn. & Kuvaev
- Thymus putoranicus Byczenn. & Kuvaev
- Thymus quinquecostatus Celak.
- Thymus × radoi Borbás
- Thymus × ramonianus Paiva & Salgueiro
- Thymus rasitatus Klokov
- Thymus reverdattoanus Serg.
- Thymus revolutus Celak.
- Thymus riatarum Humbert & Maire
- Thymus richardii Pers.
- Thymus × riojanus Uribe-Ech.
- Thymus roegneri K.Koch
- Thymus roseus Schipcz.
- Thymus × royoi P.P.Ferrer, A.Navarro, P.Pérez & E.Laguna
- Thymus × rubioi Font Quer
- Thymus × ruiz-latorrei C.Vicioso
- Thymus sachalinensis Prob.
- Thymus samius Ronniger & Rech.f.
- Thymus saturejoides Coss.
- Thymus schimperi Ronniger
- Thymus schischkinii Serg.
- Thymus × schistosus Lyka
- Thymus schlothauerae Prob.
- Thymus × schmidtii Cáp
- Thymus × segurae Mateo & M.B.Crespo
- Thymus semiglaber Klokov
- Thymus × sennenii Pau
- Thymus seravschanicus Klokov
- Thymus sergievskajae Karav.
- Thymus serpylloides Bory
- Thymus serpyllum L.
- Thymus serrulatus Hochst. ex Benth.
- Thymus sessilifolius Klokov
- Thymus × severianoi Uribe-Ech.
- Thymus sibiricus (Serg.) Klokov & Des.-Shost.
- Thymus sibthorpii Benth.
- Thymus sipyleus Boiss.
- Thymus skopjensis Micevski & Matevski
- Thymus sokolovii Klokov
- Thymus spathulifolius Hausskn. & Velen.
- Thymus spinulosus Ten.
- Thymus spryginii Vasjukov
- Thymus stojanovii Degen
- Thymus striatus Vahl
- Thymus subcollinus Klokov
- Thymus × subhirsutus Borbás & Heinr.Braun
- Thymus × subramosus Ronniger
- Thymus substriatus Borbás
- Thymus syriacus Boiss.
- Thymus talijevii Klokov & Des.-Shost.
- Thymus tauricus Klokov & Des.-Shost.
- Thymus ternejicus Prob.
- Thymus terskeicus Klokov
- Thymus teucrioides Boiss. & Spruner
- Thymus thracicus Velen.
- Thymus tiflisiensis Klokov & Des.-Shost.
- Thymus × toletanus Ladero
- Thymus transcaspicus Klokov
- Thymus transcaucasicus Ronniger
- Thymus trautvetteri Klokov & Des.-Shost.
- Thymus × tschernjaievii Klokov & Des.-Shost.
- Thymus turczaninovii Serg.
- Thymus turkmenii Yild.
- Thymus × tzvelevii Vasjukov
- Thymus urumovii (Velen.) Vasjukov
- Thymus urussovii Prob.
- Thymus ussuriensis Klokov
- Thymus × valdesii J.Gómez & R.Roselló
- Thymus vavilovii Klokov
- Thymus verchojanicus Doronkin
- Thymus × viciosoi Pau ex R.Morales
- Thymus villosus L.
- Thymus × vitekii R.Morales
- Thymus vulgaris L.
- Thymus × welwitschii Boiss.
- Thymus willdenowii Boiss.
- Thymus willkommii Ronniger
- Thymus × xilocae Mateo & M.B.Crespo
- Thymus × zedelmejeri Ronniger
- Thymus zygioides Griseb.
- Thymus zygis L.
- Thymus × zygophorus R.Morales
