= Thyme (disambiguation) =

Thyme is any member of the genus Thymus of aromatic herbs with culinary, medicinal, and ornamental uses.

Thyme may also refer to:

== Plants ==
- Thymus (plant), a genus of herbs
  - Thymus vulgaris, common thyme
  - Thymus citriodorus, lemon thyme
- Plectranthus amboinicus, Caribbean thyme
- Acinos alpinus, rock thyme
- Veronica serpyllifolia, thyme-leaf speedwell

== Other uses ==
- Thyme (band), a Japanese band
- ThYme (database), a database for thioester-active enzymes
- Thyme, a chain of British bars
- Thyme, one of the main protagonists from High Guardian Spice
- Thyme Akira Paramaanantra, the main protagonist of F4 Thailand, portrayed by Bright Vachirawit

== See also ==
- Thymus (disambiguation)
- Time (disambiguation)
- Thymeleaf, a web templating engine for Java
- TYME, an ATM/interbank network in Wisconsin and the Upper Peninsula of Michigan
