= Trifurcula thymi =

Scientific classification
- Kingdom: Animalia
- Phylum: Arthropoda
- Class: Insecta
- Order: Lepidoptera
- Family: Nepticulidae
- Genus: Trifurcula
- Species: T. thymi

Binomial name
- Trifurcula thymi (Szocs, 1965)

Synonyms
- Nepticula thymi Szocs, 1965

Species of moth

Trifurcula thymi is a moth of the family Nepticulidae. It is found from Germany and Poland to the Alps and Hungary, as well as in France and the Iberian Peninsula.

The larvae feed on Satureja cuneifolia, Satureja montana, Thymus camphoratus, Thymus glabrescens, Thymus mastichina, Thymus pannonicus, Thymus pulegioides and Thymus vulgaris. They mine the leaves of their host plant.
