= Vulcaniella grabowiella =

Scientific classification
- Kingdom: Animalia
- Phylum: Arthropoda
- Class: Insecta
- Order: Lepidoptera
- Family: Cosmopterigidae
- Genus: Vulcaniella
- Species: V. grabowiella

Binomial name
- Vulcaniella grabowiella (Staudinger, 1859)

Synonyms
- Pancalia grabowiella Staudinger, 1859

Species of moth

Vulcaniella grabowiella is a moth of the family Cosmopterigidae. It is found from the Iberian Peninsula to Asia Minor.

The wingspan is 7–9 mm.

The larvae feed on various Lamiaceae species, including Lavandula stoechas, Thymus vulgaris and Thymus algeriensis numidicus. They mine the leaves of their host plant.
