= T. camphoratus =

T. camphoratus can refer to a few different species. The specific epithet camphoratus refers to 'camphor.'

- Taiwanofungus camphoratus, a mushroom known as stout camphor fungus
- Tarchonanthus camphoratus, a shrub known as camphor bush or leleshwa
- Thymus camphoratus, a species of thyme in the genus Thymus
