= Thymus lotocephalus =

Conservation status
- Near Threatened (IUCN 3.1)

- Near Threatened (IUCN 3.1)

Scientific classification
- Kingdom: Plantae
- Clade: Tracheophytes
- Clade: Angiosperms
- Clade: Eudicots
- Clade: Asterids
- Order: Lamiales
- Family: Lamiaceae
- Genus: Thymus
- Species: T. lotocephalus

Binomial name
- Thymus lotocephalus G.López & R.Morales

Synonyms
- Thymus villosus Willd. ex Benth

Species of flowering plant

Thymus lotocephalus (Portuguese: erva-ursa) is a species of flowering plant in the mint family Lamiaceae, endemic to southern Portugal, specifically central Algarve. It inhabits both the coast and the interior (Barrocal). On the coast it is found in pine forest clearings and xerophilic scrub, on sandy, acidic substrates. On the interior, in thyme and clearings of xerophilic scrub, on marginal or calcareous substrates, somewhat decarbonated.
