= Thymus (disambiguation) =

Thymus may refer to:

- Thymus, an organ
- Thymus (plant) a genus of plants in the family Lamiaceae
- Thymus (wasp), a genus of wasps in the family Eulophidae
