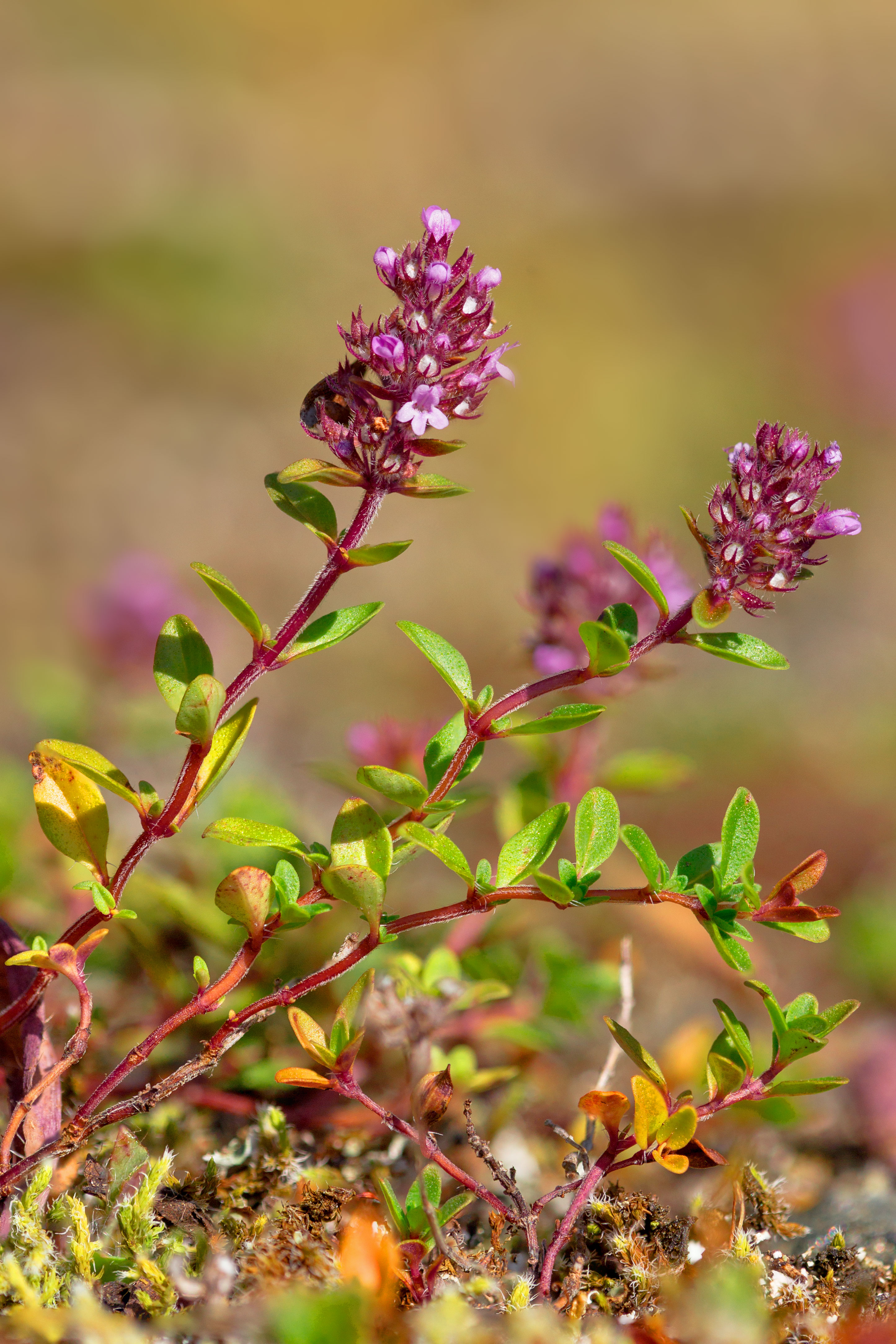

Scientific classification
- Kingdom: Plantae
- Clade: Tracheophytes
- Clade: Angiosperms
- Clade: Eudicots
- Clade: Asterids
- Order: Lamiales
- Family: Lamiaceae
- Genus: Thymus
- Species: T. pulegioides

Binomial name
- Thymus pulegioides L.

Synonyms
- Thymus ovatus Mill.

= Thymus pulegioides =

Species of flowering plant

Thymus pulegioides, common names broad-leaved thyme or lemon thyme, is a species of flowering plant in the family Lamiaceae, native to Europe. Growing to 5–25 cm (2–10 in) tall by 25 cm (10 in) wide, it is a small spreading subshrub with strongly aromatic leaves, and lilac pink flowers in early summer. The specific epithet pulegioides highlights its similarity to another species within Lamiaceae, Mentha pulegium (pennyroyal).

== Description ==
Broad-leaved thyme is a creeping dwarf evergreen shrub with woody stems and a taproot. It is rather similar to wild thyme (Thymus serpyllum) but it is larger, the leaves are wider and all the stems form flowering shoots. The reddish stems are squarish in cross-section and have hairs on the edges. The leaves are in opposite pairs with short stalks, and the linear ovate blades have tapering bases and untoothed margins. The plant flowers in July and August. The usually pink or mauve flowers form rounded umbels and each has a tube-like calyx and an irregular straight-tubed, hairy corolla. The upper petal is notched and the lower one is larger than the two lateral petals and has three flattened lobes which form a lip. Each flower has four projecting stamens and two fused carpels. The fruit is a dry, four-chambered schizocarp.

== Distribution and habitat ==
Broad-leaved thyme is native to temperate parts of Europe. It grows in rough places on light, sparse soils. These include hills, rocky outcrops, gravels, sandy places, wasteground and roadsides.

== Cultivation ==
Suitable for cultivation in any well-drained alkaline or neutral soil in full sun, this ornamental thyme is useful as groundcover, but can also be used like thyme in cooking. Numerous cultivars have been selected, of which 'Aureus', with lemon-scented gold leaves, and 'Bertram Anderson' have both gained the Royal Horticultural Society's Award of Garden Merit.
