= Thymus capitellatus =

Conservation status
- Near Threatened (IUCN 3.1)

Scientific classification
- Kingdom: Plantae
- Clade: Tracheophytes
- Clade: Angiosperms
- Clade: Eudicots
- Clade: Asterids
- Order: Lamiales
- Family: Lamiaceae
- Genus: Thymus
- Species: T. capitellatus

Binomial name
- Thymus capitellatus Hoffmanns. & Link

Synonyms
- Thymus mastichina var. capitellatus (Hoffmanns. & Link) Malag.; Thymus capitellatus var. macrocephalus Rouy; Origanum capitellatum (Hoffmanns. & Link) Kuntze; Thymus capitellatus subsp. anomalus F.M.Vázquez, Pinto Gomes & Paiva Ferr.

Species of flowering plant

Thymus capitellatus is a species of flowering plant in the mint family Lamiaceae, endemic to Portugal.

== Description ==
Thymus capitellatus is a subshrub up to 50 cm (20 in) tall, erect. It has long, graceful stems, quadrangular in section, with very short hairs. Leaves are 3.5 mm–5.5 mm × 1 mm–2 mm (0.138 in–0.217 in × 0.039 in–0.079 in), with a tomentose underside and yellowish spheroidal glands; petiolated. Inflorescence is 8–17 mm (0.31–0.67 in). Corolla up to 8 mm (0.31 in), white or cream color. Purple stamens. n = 15.

== Distribution and habitat ==
Thymus capitellatus is native to southwest Portugal and is strongly present around the Tagus Estuary and Sado Estuary, inhabiting moorlands, xerophilic scrub (cistus, heaths) and sometimes in pine, eucalyptus and acacia forests, colonizing sandy acid soils of a dune nature and above all paleodunes (stabilized dunes).
