= Thymus dubjanskyi =

Scientific classification
- Kingdom: Plantae
- Clade: Tracheophytes
- Clade: Angiosperms
- Clade: Eudicots
- Clade: Asterids
- Order: Lamiales
- Family: Lamiaceae
- Genus: Thymus
- Species: T. dubjanskyi

Binomial name
- Thymus dubjanskyi Klokov & Des.-Shost.

Species of plant in the mint family

Thymus dubjanskyi is a species of flowering plant in the family Lamiaceae, native to central and southern European Russia. It is a specialist on chalky soils.
