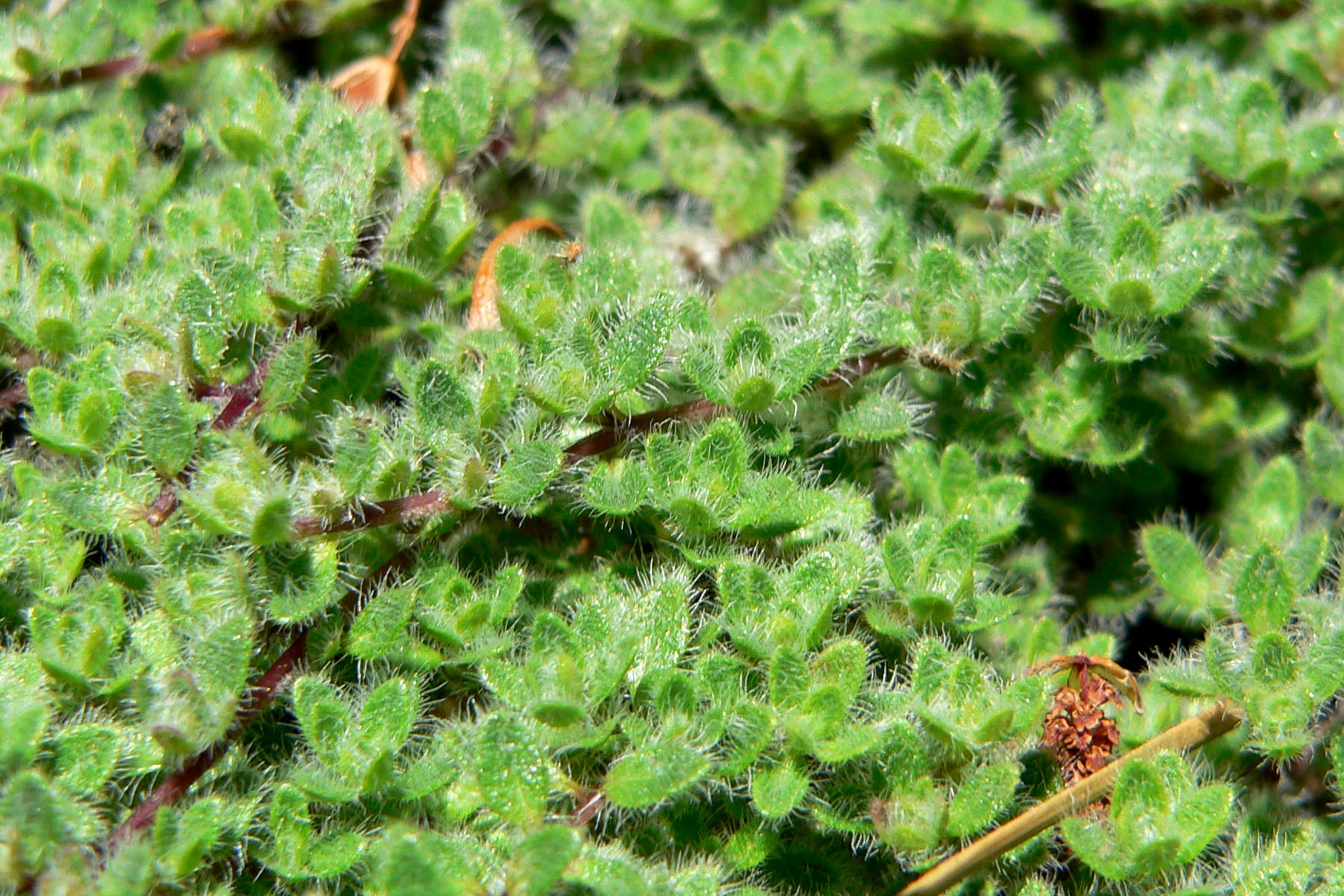

Scientific classification
- Kingdom: Plantae
- Clade: Tracheophytes
- Clade: Angiosperms
- Clade: Eudicots
- Clade: Asterids
- Order: Lamiales
- Family: Lamiaceae
- Genus: Thymus
- Species: T. pseudolanuginosus

Binomial name
- Thymus pseudolanuginosus Ronniger

Synonyms
- Thymus praecox subsp. britannicus (Ronniger) Holub

= Thymus pseudolanuginosus =

Species of flowering plant

Thymus pseudolanuginosus - commonly called woolly thyme - is now also classified as Thymus praecox subsp. britannicus. It was also formerly known as Thymus lanuginosus.

== Description ==
This low-growing creeping thyme with hairy or woolly leaves and stems, can be quite difficult to delineate between other hairy and non-hairy creeping thymes. It is of unknown specific origin in southern Europe.

The leaves in wild creeping thyme vary from slightly glabrous (smooth) to sparsely covered in white hairs, or thickly covered on both surfaces, with the margins ciliate (hairy), or just ciliate at the base. Both growth low to the ground and leaf hairiness could be an adaptation to a cold or snowy climate, for example a mountainous habitat.

== Cultivation ==
Thymus pseudolanuginosus is cultivated as an ornamental plant. It is often grown as a groundcover, where it can form extensive low mats. It is also used in rock gardens.
