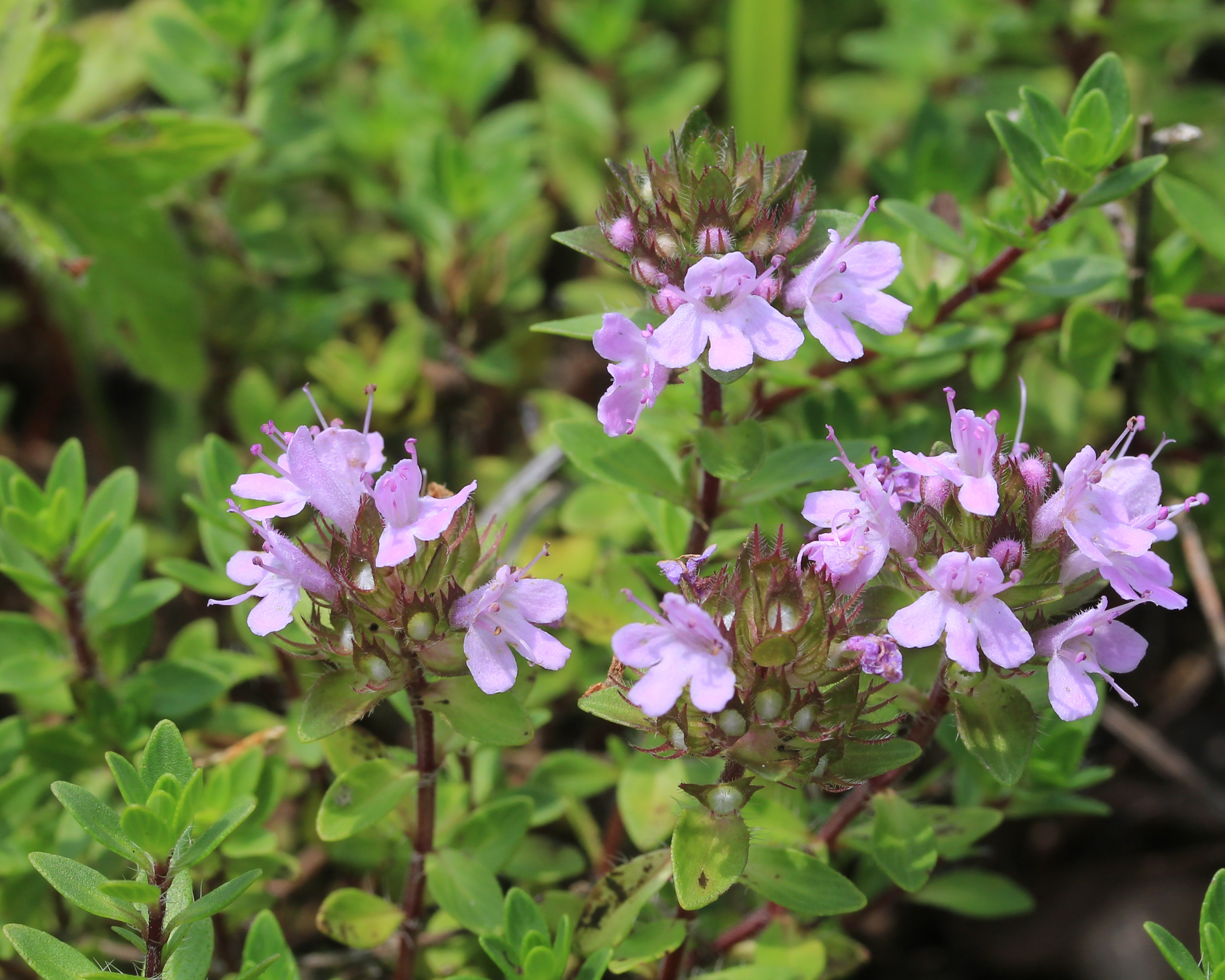

Scientific classification
- Kingdom: Plantae
- Clade: Embryophytes
- Clade: Tracheophytes
- Clade: Angiosperms
- Clade: Eudicots
- Clade: Asterids
- Order: Lamiales
- Family: Lamiaceae
- Genus: Thymus
- Species: T. quinquecostatus

Binomial name
- Thymus quinquecostatus Čelak.

Synonyms
- Thymus serpyllum subsp. quinquecostatus (Čelak.) Kitam.

= Thymus quinquecostatus =

Species of flowering plant

Thymus quinquecostatus is a species of flowering plant in the mint family (Lamiaceae); it is endemic to North-East Asia and grows in China, Japan, Mongolia, the Korean Peninsula and the Russian Far East.

== Description ==
Thymus quinquecostatus has spreading or ascending stems that grow almost horizontally. The vegetative shoots are shorter than the fruiting branches, which reach 3–15 cm (1.2–5.9 in) in height, grow in clusters, and are densely hairy at the top. The leaves are smooth, leathery, and covered in glands. They are oblong-elliptic or oblong-lanceolate, measuring 0.7–1.3 cm (0.28–0.51 in) long and 1.5–3 mm (0.06–0.12 in) wide, with ciliate bases and margins.

The flowers are arranged in dense, head-like clusters with shedding bracts and stems up to 4 mm (0.16 in) long. The bell-shaped calyx is hairy, measures 5–6 mm, and has an upper lip equal to or longer than the lower one. The corolla is 6.5–7 mm (0.26–0.28 in) long, and its tube is shorter than the calyx. This plant flowers in August.
