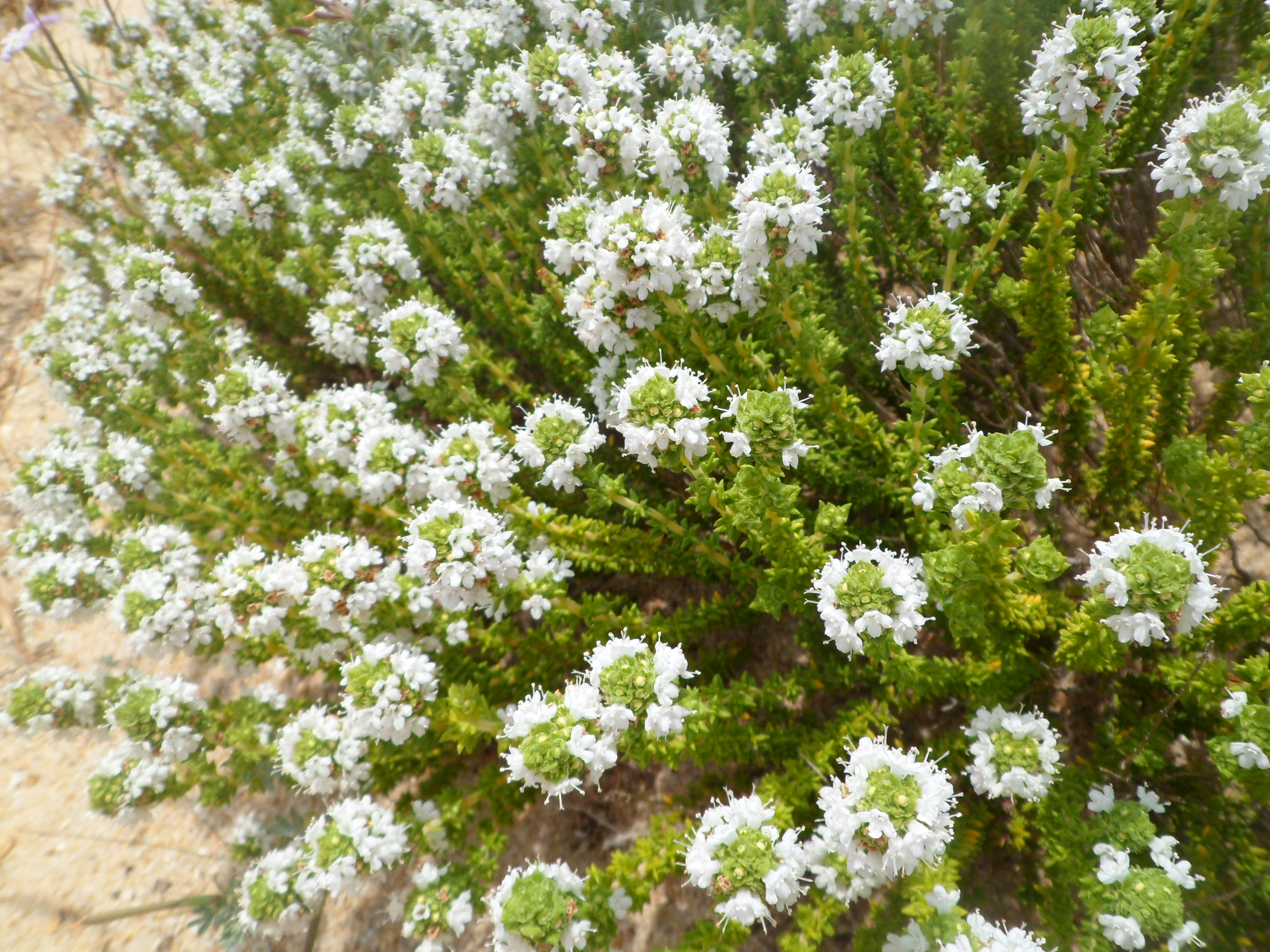

Conservation status
- Near Threatened (IUCN 3.1)

Scientific classification
- Kingdom: Plantae
- Clade: Tracheophytes
- Clade: Angiosperms
- Clade: Eudicots
- Clade: Asterids
- Order: Lamiales
- Family: Lamiaceae
- Genus: Thymus
- Species: T. carnosus

Binomial name
- Thymus carnosus Boiss.

Synonyms
- Origanum carnosum (Boiss.) Kuntze

= Thymus carnosus =

Species of plant in the mint family

Thymus carnosus is a species of flowering plant in the family Lamiaceae. It is native to southern Portugal and Spain. It is a woody, upright perennial to 41 cm (16 in) tall, with clusters of fleshy, oval, light green to grey-green leaves, furry on their undersides. Its white, lilac, or pink flowers are borne on 41 cm (16 in) spikes and are protected by oval green bracts.

The plant is hardy from USDA Zones 7–11.
