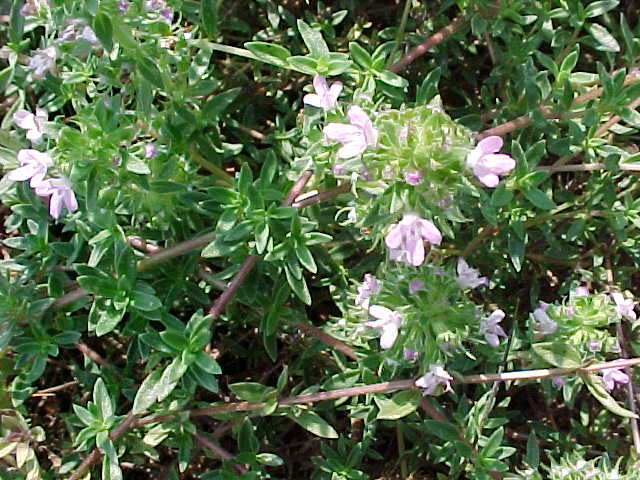

Scientific classification
- Kingdom: Plantae
- Clade: Tracheophytes
- Clade: Angiosperms
- Clade: Eudicots
- Clade: Asterids
- Order: Lamiales
- Family: Lamiaceae
- Genus: Thymus
- Species: T. herba-barona

Binomial name
- Thymus herba-barona Loisel.

Synonyms
- Acinos herba-barona (Loisel.) G.Don; Calamintha herba-barona (Loisel.) Heynh.; Origanum herba-barona (Loisel.) Kuntze; Thymus affinis Sieber ex Benth.; Thymus attenuatus St.-Lag.; Thymus herba-barona f. denticulosus Ronniger; Thymus herba-barona var. mabilleanus Ronniger

= Thymus herba-barona =

Species of herb

Thymus herba-barona is a species of thyme native to Corsica. It is also sometimes known by the common name caraway thyme, as it has a strong scent similar to caraway, for which it can be used as a substitute in any recipe. It can be used in cuisine or as an evergreen ground cover plant for the garden.

The species was described by Jean Louis August Loiseleur-Deslongchamps in 1807. Thymus herba-barona subsp. bivalens, which is native to the Spanish island of Mallorca, is now considered a distinct species, Thymus bivalens.

== Description ==
Caraway thyme is a creeping, woody-based perennial, growing to 10 to 25 cm (4 to 10 in) high and spreading out across the ground to a width of 30 cm (12 in). The leaves are 4 to 10 mm (0.2 to 0.4 in) long, lanceolate, dark glossy green and hairy. The foliage has a strong aroma of caraway. The flowers are pink with four petals and a prominent lower lip. They are produced in late spring and early summer, and are attractive to bees and butterflies.

== Cultivation and uses ==
Caraway thyme grows best in average soil with light watering and full sunlight. The plant was favoured in England as a seasoning for barons of beef; this inspired its scientific name. It is cultivated in gardens across the world. Caraway thyme is difficult to grow from seed, so it is usually purchased as young plants 5–10 cm high, in small pots.

Caraway thyme contains an essential oil and the plant has antiseptic, deodorant and disinfectant uses. It also has uses in perfumery, as a mouth wash and as a traditional medicine. A study undertaken to compare the essential oil with similar oils from two other members of the genus found that all three had similar antimicrobial activities against gram-positive bacteria and against mycetes as compared to the well known antiseptic chlorhexidine gluconate.
