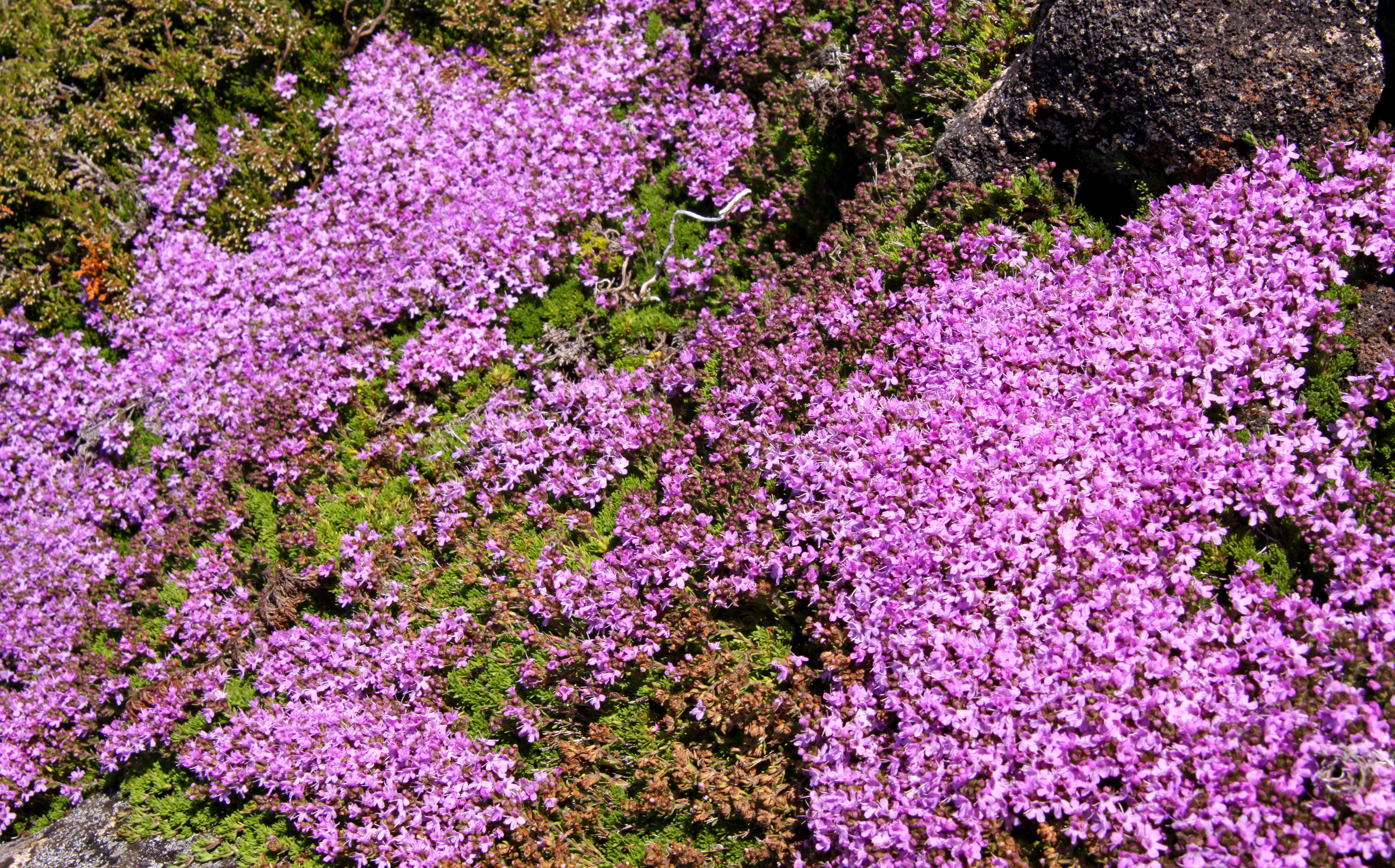
- Thymus caespititius on Mount Pico

Scientific classification
- Kingdom: Plantae
- Clade: Tracheophytes
- Clade: Angiosperms
- Clade: Eudicots
- Clade: Asterids
- Order: Lamiales
- Family: Lamiaceae
- Genus: Thymus
- Species: T. caespititius

Binomial name
- Thymus caespititius Brot.

= Thymus caespititius =

Species of shrub

Thymus caespititius is a dwarf, aromatic mat-forming groundcover shrub. It is native to oceanic areas in the Iberian Peninsula (northwest Portugal and northwest Spain) and the Atlantic archipelagos of the Azores and Madeira.

The plant has narrow, spatula-shaped, smooth leaves to 6 mm (0.24 in) long, fringed with tiny hairs. The rose, lilac or white flowers are borne in small, flattened mat-hugging heads from late spring to summer.

== Cultivation ==
Thymus caespititius, grown as an ornamental plant, and is hardy down to USDA Zone 7. The cultivar Thymus caespititius 'Aureus' has narrow, light gold leaves.

== Gallery ==
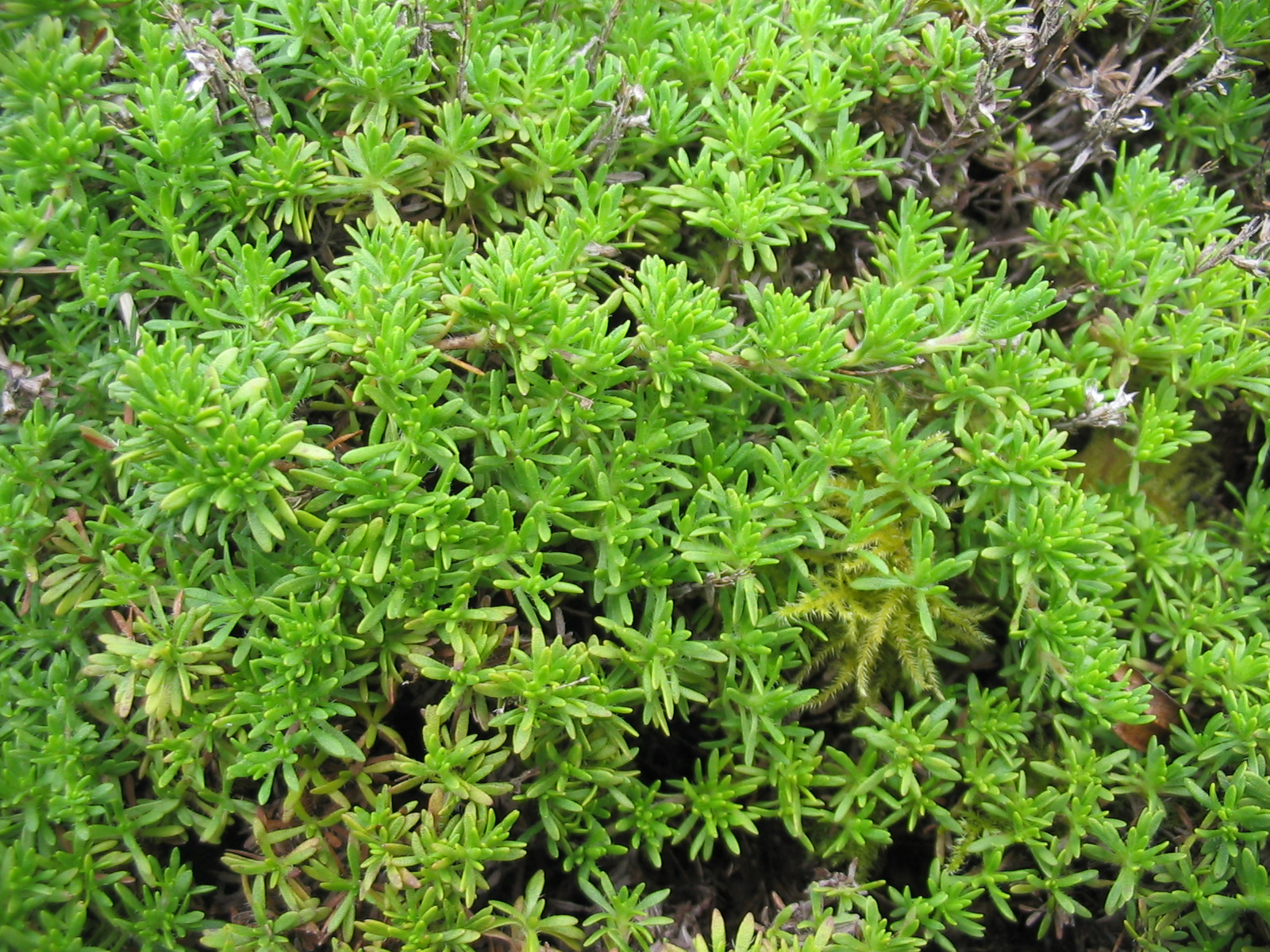
Ericoid foliage of Thymus caespititius

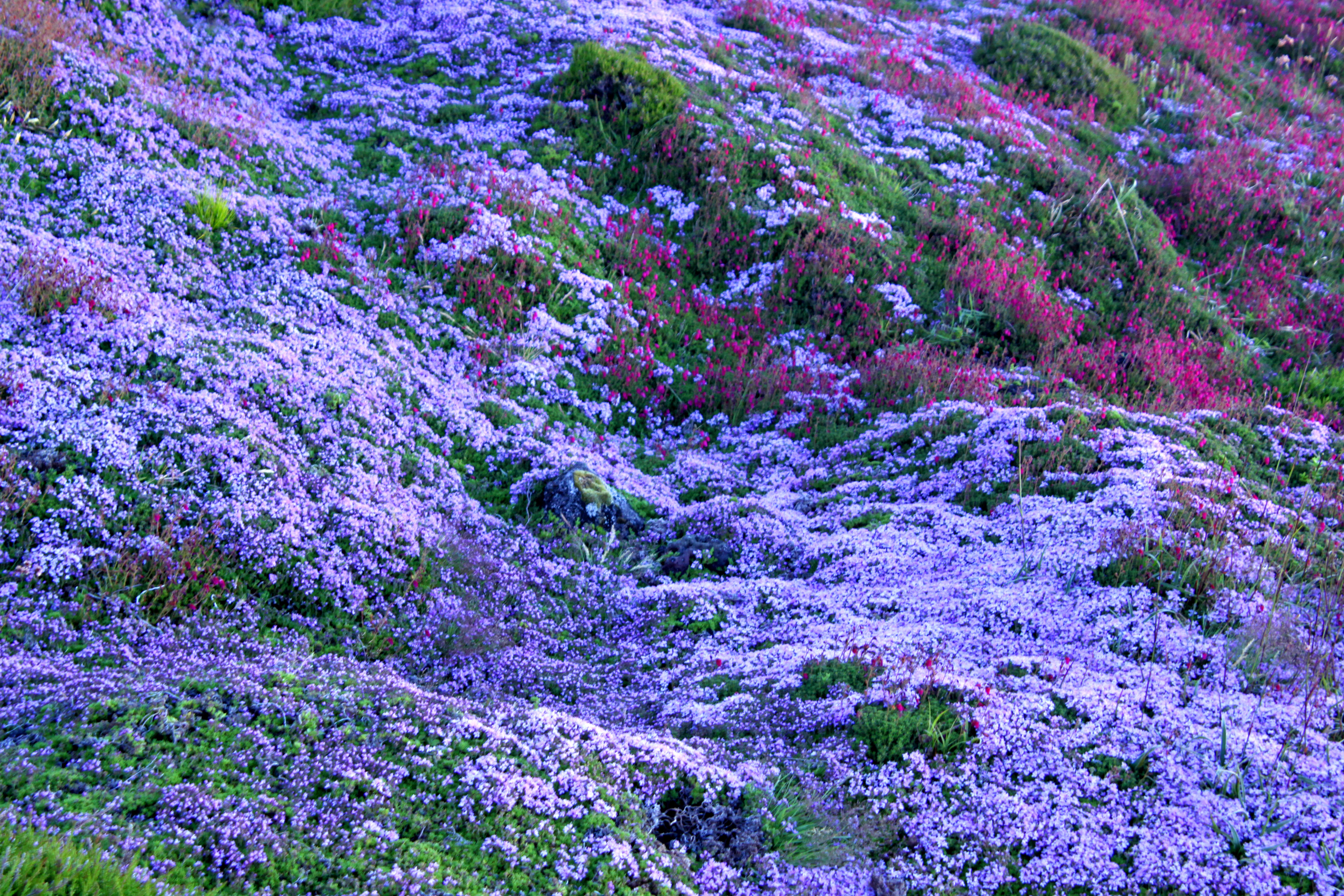
Patch of Thymus caespititius with Daboecia azorica in background, Pico Island

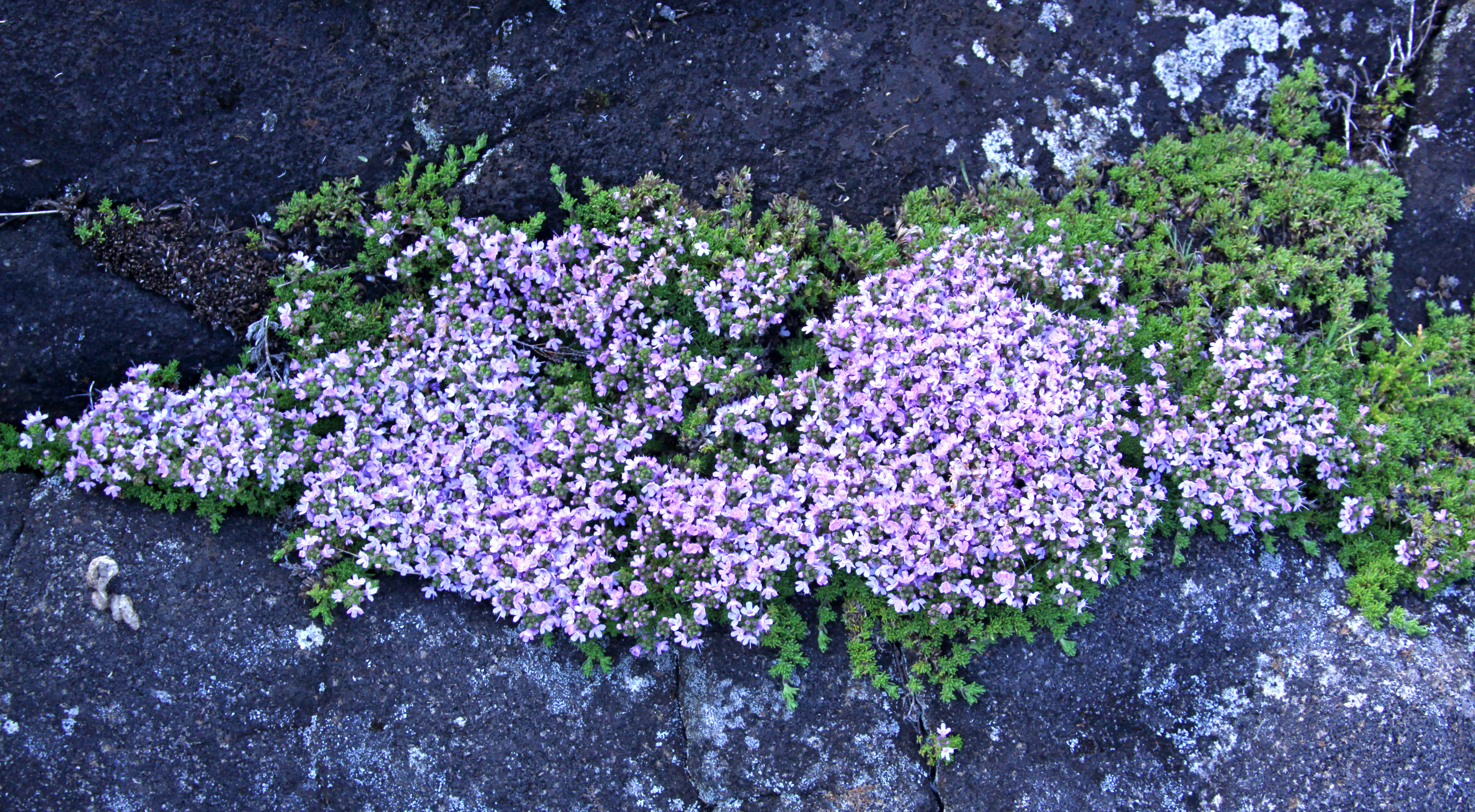
Blooming specimen in lava crevice
