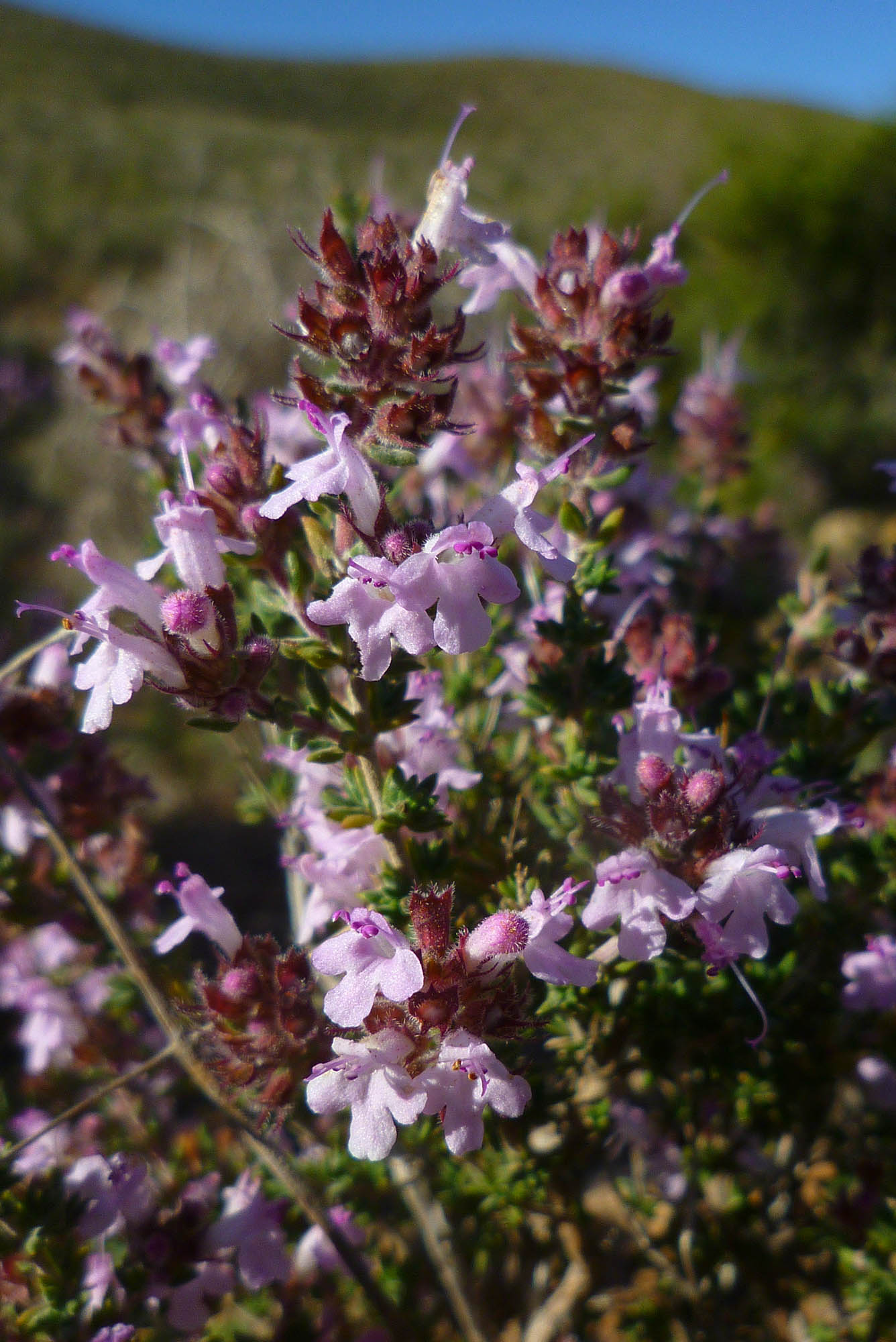
- Close-up of flowers
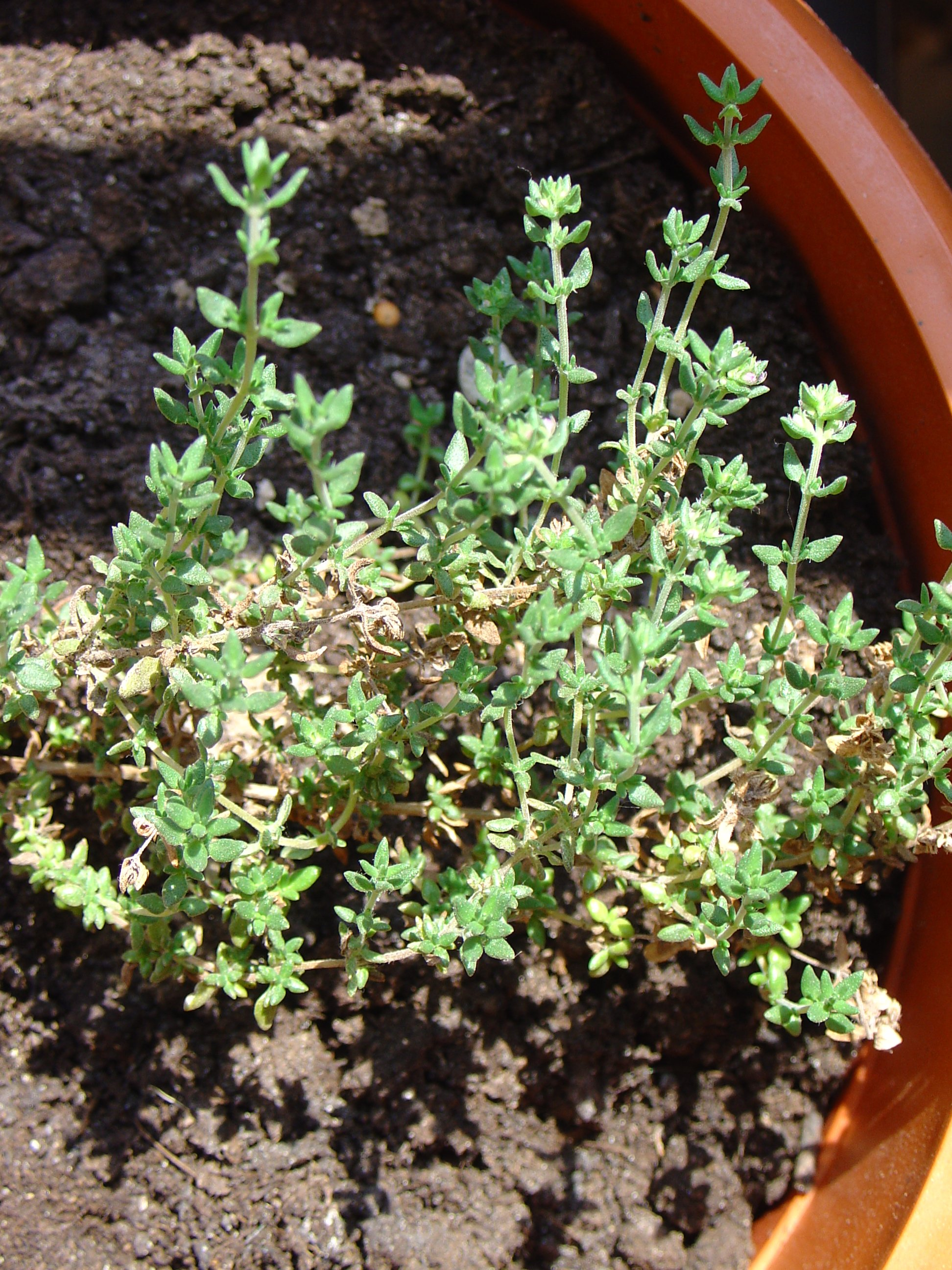
- Potted specimen

Scientific classification
- Kingdom: Plantae
- Clade: Tracheophytes
- Clade: Angiosperms
- Clade: Eudicots
- Clade: Asterids
- Order: Lamiales
- Family: Lamiaceae
- Genus: Thymus
- Species: T. hyemalis

Binomial name
- Thymus hyemalis Lange

Synonyms
- Origanum hyemale (Lange) Kuntze; Thymus reuteri Rouy; Thymus millefloris D.Rivera, Flores & Laencina

= Thymus hyemalis =

Species of plant in the mint family

Thymus hyemalis, the winter thyme, is a species of flowering plant in the family Lamiaceae, endemic to southeast Spain. Its volatile oil constituents vary seasonally.

== Subtaxa ==
The following subtaxa are accepted:

- Thymus hyemalis subsp. hyemalis
- Thymus hyemalis subsp. millefloris (D.Rivera, Flores & Laencina) R.Morales – Almería
