= Thyme =

Culinary herb

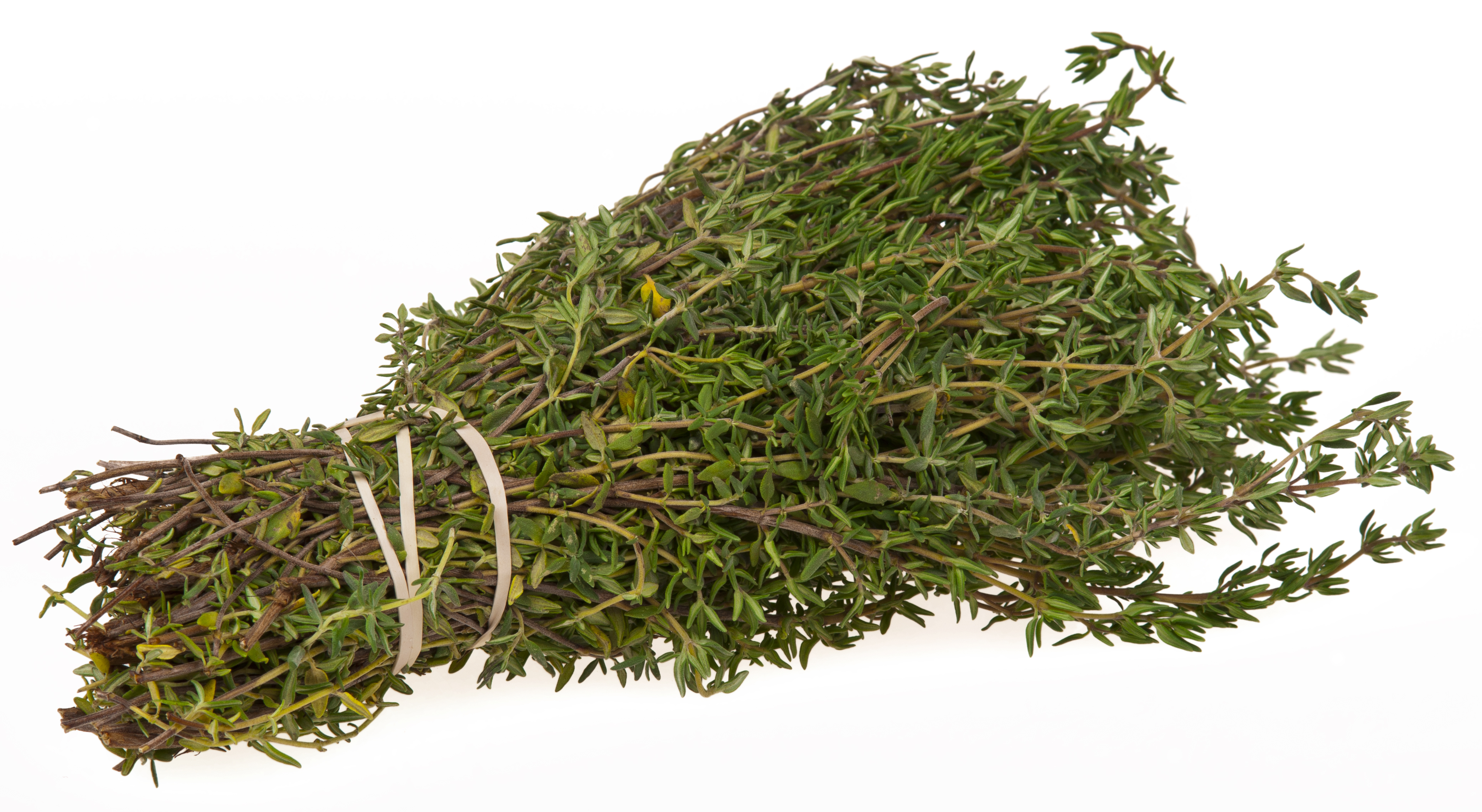
- A bundle of thyme
- Food energy (per 100 g serving): 101 kcal (420 kJ)
Nutritional value
(per 100 g serving)
- Protein: 6 g
- Fat: 1.7 g
- Carbohydrate: 24 g

Thyme (/taɪm/) is a culinary herb consisting of the dried aerial parts of some members of the genus Thymus of flowering plants in the mint family Lamiaceae. Thymes are native to Mediterranean countries in North Africa, Levant and Southern Europe. Thymes have culinary, medicinal, and ornamental uses. The species most commonly cultivated and used for culinary purposes is Thymus vulgaris, native to Southeast Europe.

== History ==
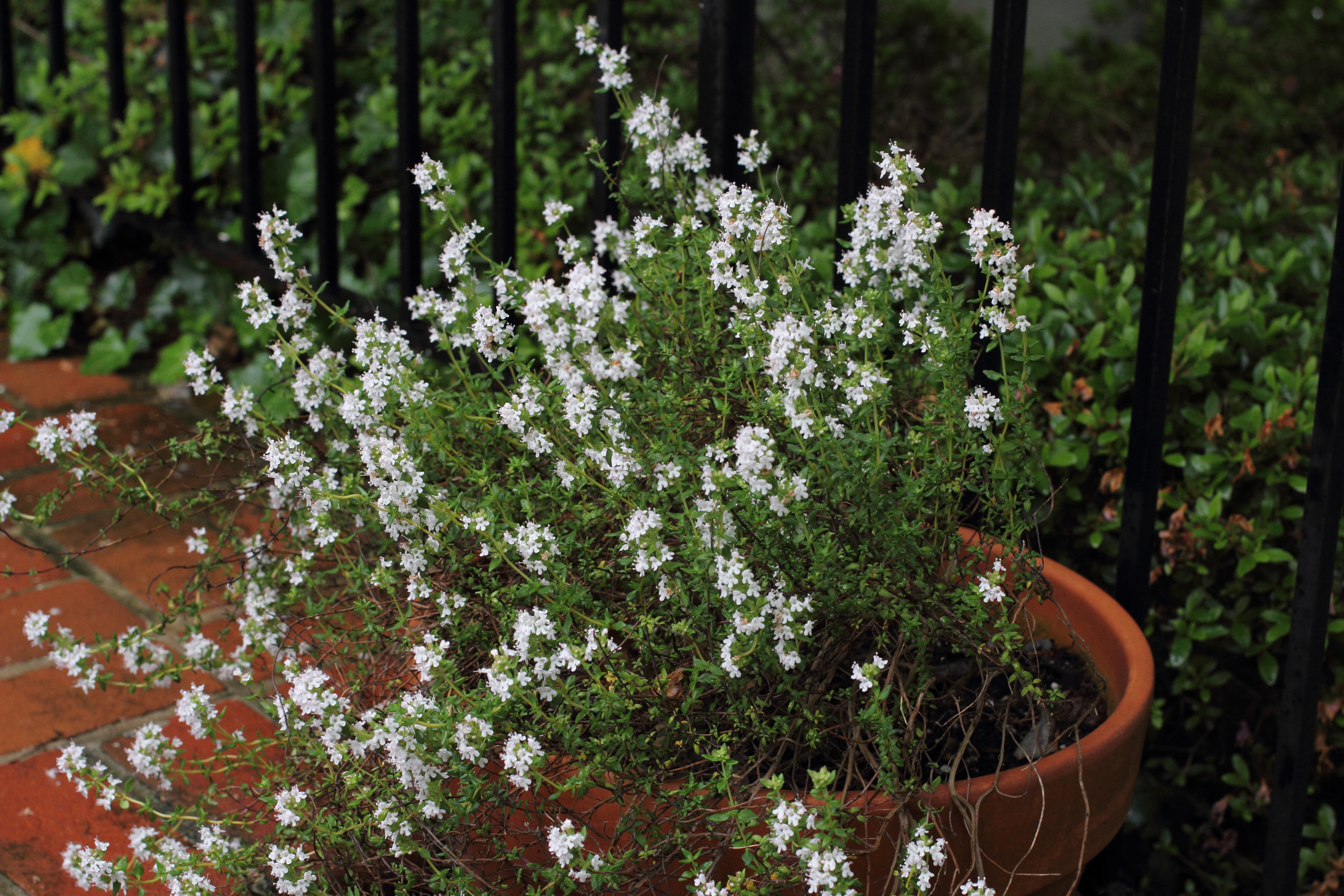
Flowering thyme

Wild thyme grows in the Levant, where it might have been first cultivated. Ancient Egyptians used common thyme (Thymus vulgaris) for embalming. The ancient Greeks used it in their baths and burnt it as incense in their temples, believing it was a source of courage.

The spread of thyme throughout Europe was thought to be done by Romans, as they used it to purify their rooms and to "give an aromatic flavour to cheese and liqueurs". In the European Middle Ages, the herb was placed beneath pillows to aid sleep and ward off nightmares. In this period, women also often gave knights and warriors gifts that included thyme leaves, as it was believed to bring courage to the bearer. Thyme was also used as incense and placed on coffins during funerals, as it was supposed to assure passage into the next life.

The name of the genus of fish Thymallus, first given to the grayling (T. thymallus, described in the 1758 edition of Systema Naturae by Swedish zoologist Carl Linnaeus), originates from the faint smell of thyme that emanates from the flesh.

== Cultivation ==
Thyme is best cultivated in a hot, sunny location with well-drained soil. It is generally planted in the spring, and thereafter grows as a perennial. It can be propagated by seed, cuttings, or dividing rooted sections of the plant. It tolerates drought well. It can be pruned after flowering to keep from getting woody.

== Culinary use ==
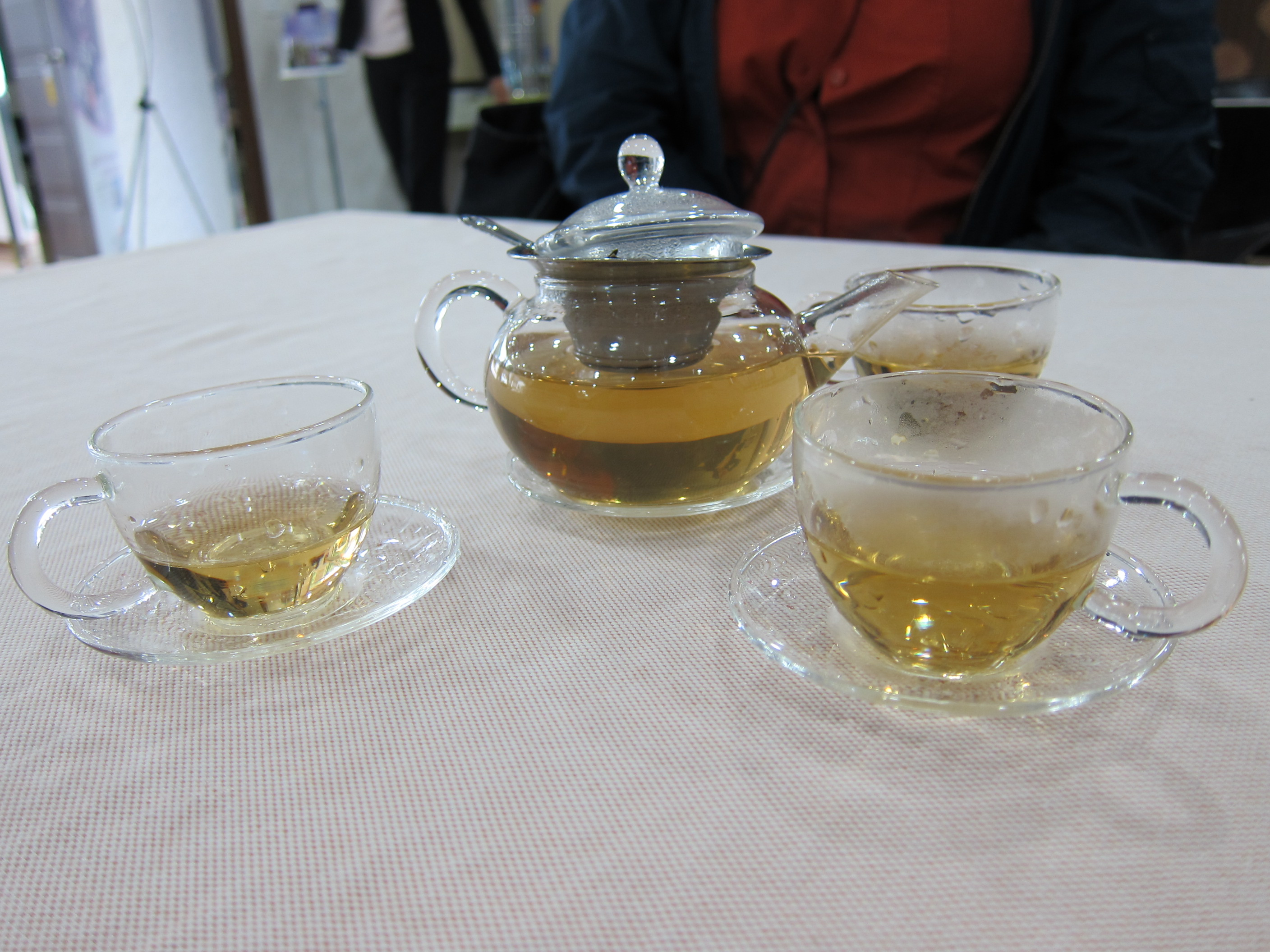
Seombaengnihyang-cha (Ulleungdo thyme tea)

Thyme is a common component of the bouquet garni, and of herbes de Provence.

Thyme is sold both fresh and dried. While summer-seasonal, fresh greenhouse thyme is often available year-round. The fresh form is more flavourful but also less convenient; storage life is rarely more than a week. However, the fresh form can last many months if carefully frozen, and thyme retains its flavour on drying better than many other herbs.

Fresh thyme is commonly sold in bunches of sprigs. A sprig is a single stem snipped from the plant. It is composed of a woody stem with paired leaf or flower clusters ("leaves") spaced 15 to 25 millimetres (1/2 to 1 inch) apart. A recipe may measure thyme by the bunch (or fraction thereof), or by the sprig, or by the tablespoon or teaspoon. Dried thyme is widely used in Armenia in tisanes.

Depending on how it is used in a dish, the whole sprig may be used, or the leaves removed and the stems discarded. Usually, when a recipe mentions a bunch or sprig, it means the whole form; when it mentions spoons, it means the leaves. It is perfectly acceptable to substitute dried for whole thyme. Leaves may be removed from stems either by scraping with the back of a knife, or by pulling through the fingers or tines of a fork.

== Chemical and antimicrobial properties ==
Thymol is the principal aromatic component of thyme.

The chemical composition of Thymus (thyme) includes a variety of essential oils, flavonoids, phenolic acids, triterpenes, and other compounds. The essential oils found in thyme include thymol, which is a major component responsible for the plant's antiseptic properties, and carvacrol, another primary component with similar functions. Other essential oils present are p-cymene, γ-terpinene, linalool, and 1,8-cineole. Gas chromatographic analysis reveals that the most abundant volatile component of thyme leaves is thymol, at 8.55mg/g. Other components are carvacrol, linalool, α-terpineol, and 1,8-cineole.

Some of these compounds have beneficial properties. In particular, thymol has been historically used as an antibiotic and antiseptic, especially in traditional medicine. Oil of thyme, the essential oil of common thyme, contains 20–54% thymol. Thymol is an active ingredient in various commercially produced mouthwashes, such as Listerine.

Flavonoids in thyme include luteolin-7-O-glucoside, a glycoside known for its antioxidant and anti-inflammatory properties, as well as apigenin, quercetin, and kaempferol. Phenolic acids such as rosmarinic acid, which is known for its antioxidant, anti-inflammatory, and antimicrobial activities, along with caffeic acid and chlorogenic acid, are also present in thyme.

Triterpenes, such as oleanolic acid and ursolic acid, are part of thyme's composition, contributing to its overall health benefits. Additionally, thyme contains tannins, which contribute to its astringent properties, as well as saponins and other minor compounds.

== Important species and cultivars ==
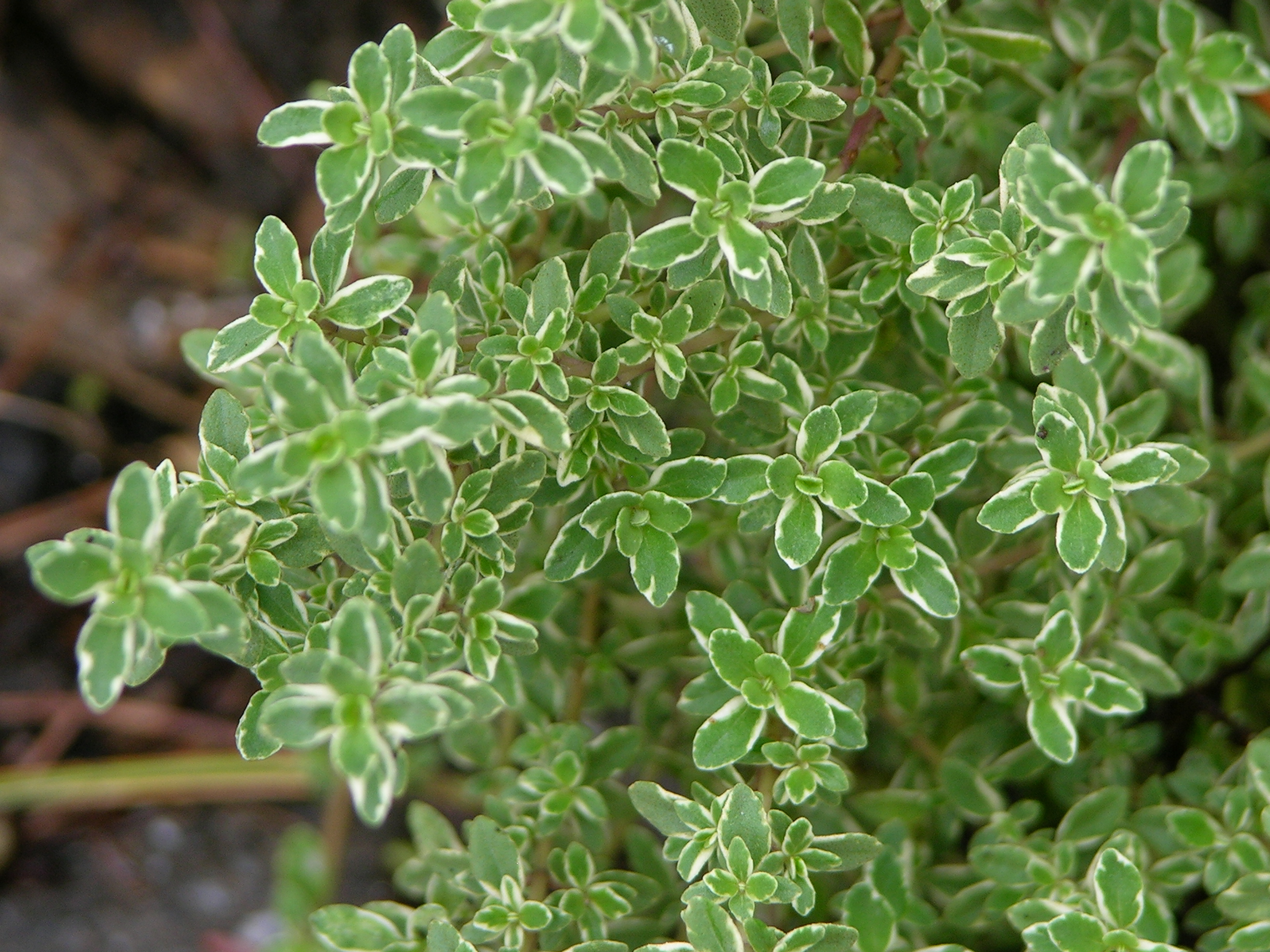
Variegated lemon thyme

- Thymus citriodorus – various lemon thymes, orange thymes, lime thyme
- Thymus herba-barona (caraway thyme) is used both as a culinary herb and a ground cover, and has a very strong caraway scent due to the chemical carvone.
- Thymus praecox (mother of thyme, wild thyme), is cultivated as an ornamental, but is in Iceland also gathered as a wild herb for cooking, and drunk as a warm infusion.
- Thymus pseudolanuginosus (woolly thyme) is not a culinary herb, but is grown as a ground cover.
- Thymus serpyllum (wild thyme, creeping thyme) is an important nectar source plant for honeybees. All thyme species are nectar sources, but wild thyme covers large areas of droughty, rocky soils in southern Europe (both Greece and Malta are especially famous for wild thyme honey) and North Africa, as well as in similar landscapes in the Berkshire and Catskill Mountains of the northeastern US. The lowest growing of the widely used thyme is good for walkways. It is also an important caterpillar food plant for large and common blue butterflies.
- Thymus vulgaris (common thyme, English thyme, summer thyme, winter thyme, French thyme, or garden thyme) is a commonly used culinary herb. Common thyme is a Mediterranean perennial which is best suited to well-drained soils and full sun.
