= Thymus algeriensis =

Scientific classification
- Kingdom: Plantae
- Clade: Tracheophytes
- Clade: Angiosperms
- Clade: Eudicots
- Clade: Asterids
- Order: Lamiales
- Family: Lamiaceae
- Genus: Thymus
- Species: T. algeriensis

Binomial name
- Thymus algeriensis Boiss. & Reut.

Synonyms
- Thymus tunetanus Pomel; Thymus zattarellus Pomel

Species of plant in the mint family

Thymus algeriensis is a species of flowering plant in the family Lamiaceae. It is native to North Africa, from Morocco to Libya. A widespread species, it is used locally as a culinary herb, both fresh and dried.
