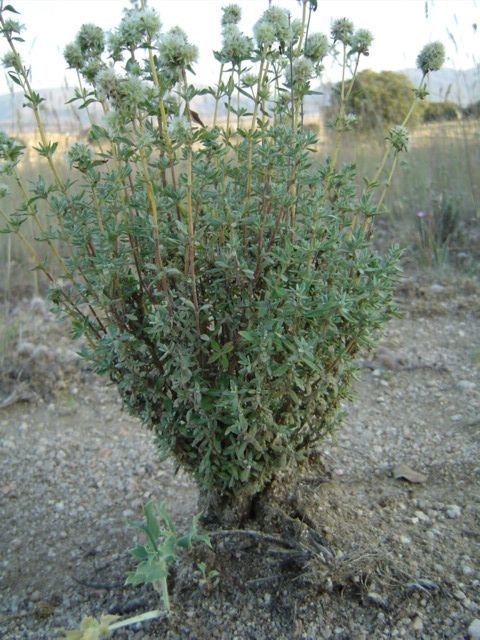

Conservation status
- Least Concern (IUCN 3.1)

Scientific classification
- Kingdom: Plantae
- Clade: Tracheophytes
- Clade: Angiosperms
- Clade: Eudicots
- Clade: Asterids
- Order: Lamiales
- Family: Lamiaceae
- Genus: Thymus
- Species: T. mastichina

Binomial name
- Thymus mastichina (L.) L.

= Thymus mastichina =

Species of herb

Thymus mastichina is a species in the family Lamiaceae. It is endemic to the central Iberian Peninsula in Spain and Portugal.

The perennial herb, with white flowers, can reach a height of 50 centimetres (1 1/2 ft).

Uses: Oil from the flower is used in some pain-relieving lotions, such as Aleve X.

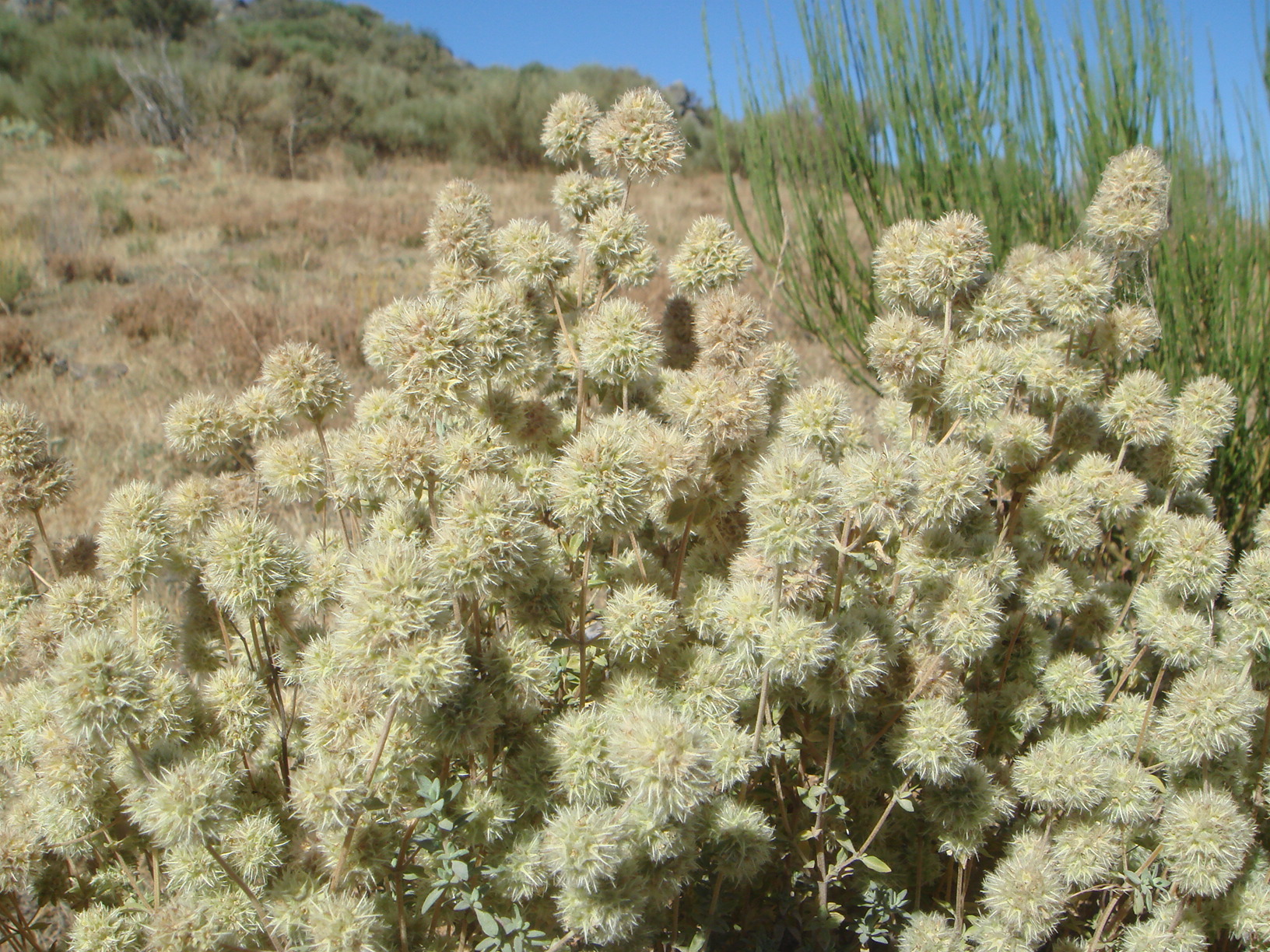
Flowers

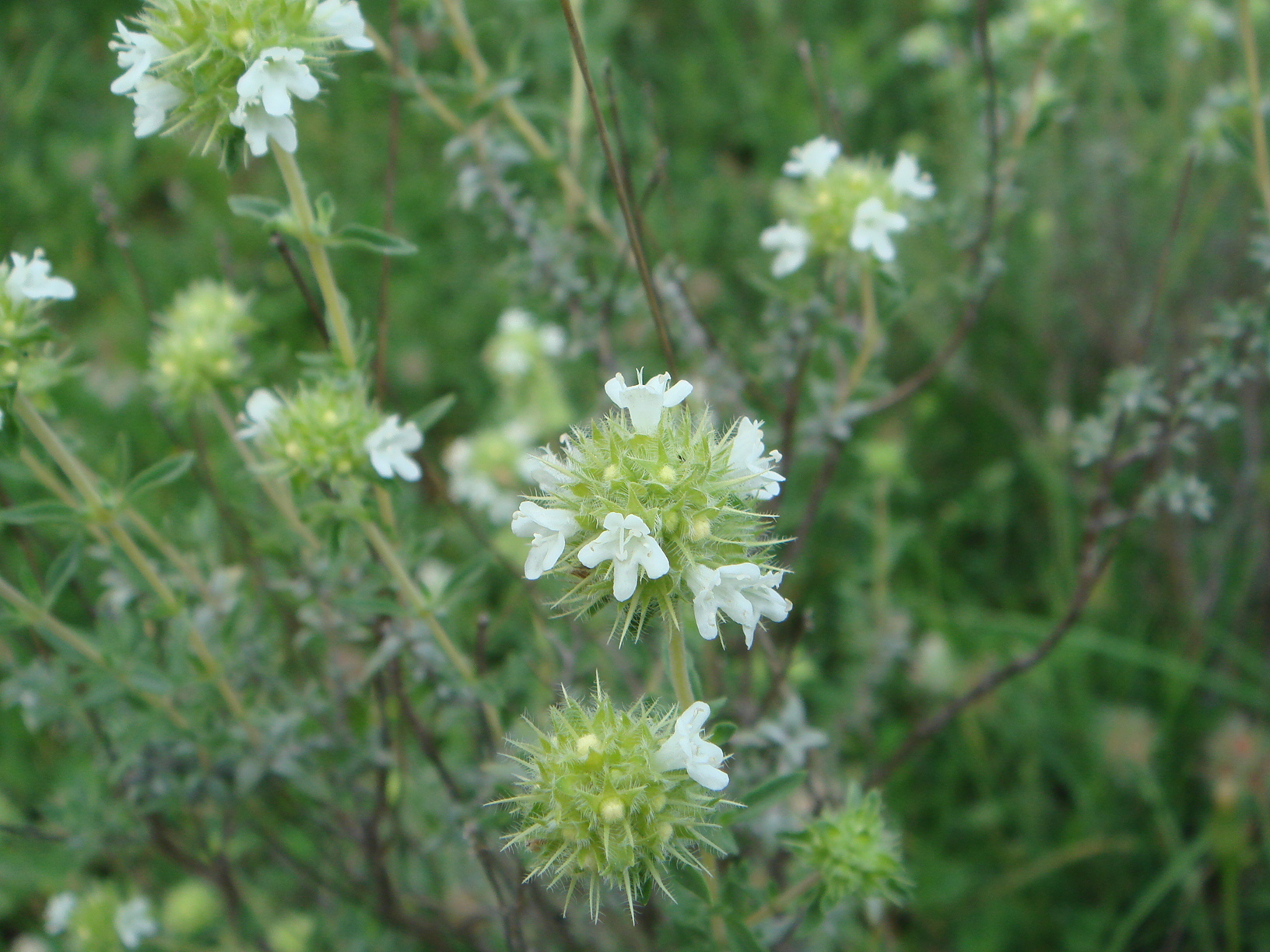
Flowers and foliage
