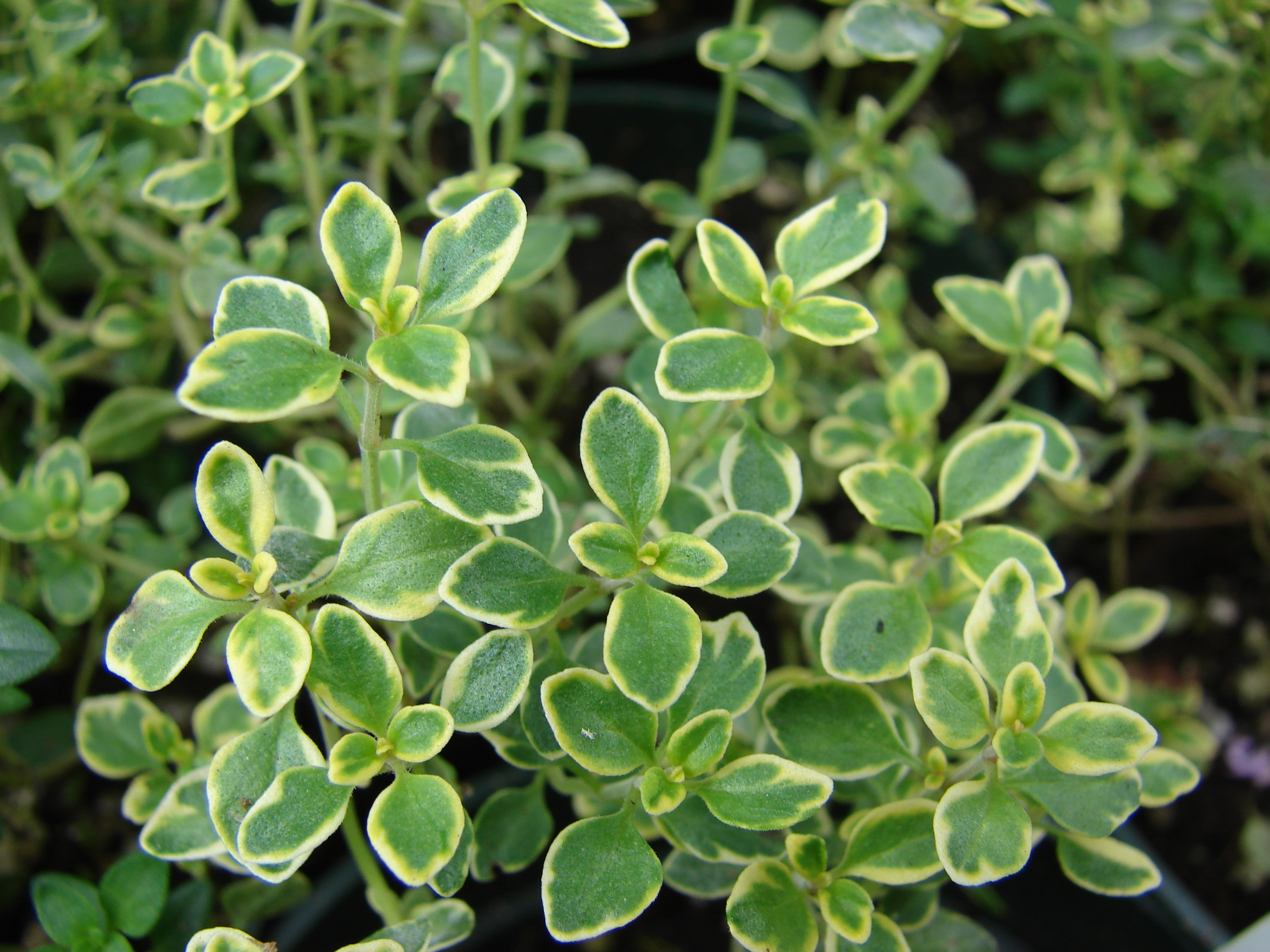

Scientific classification
- Kingdom: Plantae
- Clade: Tracheophytes
- Clade: Angiosperms
- Clade: Eudicots
- Clade: Asterids
- Order: Lamiales
- Family: Lamiaceae
- Genus: Thymus
- Species: T. citriodorus

Binomial name
- Thymus citriodorus (Pers.) Schreb.

Synonyms
- Thymus × citriodorus T. serpyllum citratus T. serpyllum citriodora T. serpyllum citriodorum

= Thymus citriodorus =

Species of flowering plant

Thymus citriodorus, the lemon thyme or citrus thyme, is a lemon-scented evergreen mat-forming perennial plant in the family Lamiaceae. There has been a great amount of confusion over the plant's correct name and origin. Recent DNA analysis suggests that it is not a hybrid or cross, but a distinct species as it was first described in 1811. An analysis in a different study clustered Thymus citriodorus together with Thymus vulgaris, which is considered one of its parent species (see below).

T. citriodorus is an evergreen sub-shrub, growing to 0.1 metres (3.9 in) in height by 0.3 metres (12 in) in spread. It prefers full sun and well draining soil. The bloom period is mid to late summer, with pink to lavender flowers that are a nectar source for bees and butterflies.

== Uses ==
Thymus citriodorus and its cultivars are grown as ornamentals, culinary herbs, and medicinal plants. In landscaping, the plants are often used as groundcovers or for planting in beds, between stepping stones, and in containers. In xeriscaping it is useful in hot, arid regions. The plant is drought-tolerant once established. As nectar-producing plants, they are cultivated in bee and butterfly gardens.

The leaves are eaten raw in salads or used as a fresh or dried flavoring herb in cooking and for herbal teas. Other uses include essential oil, folk remedies, antiseptics, respiratory aids, aromatherapy, deodorants, perfumes, skincare and cosmetics.

== Distribution ==
There is also no unanimity regarding its origin, as some authors say that Thymus citriodorus has no natural distribution, while others refer to it as native to Southern Europe and that it is widely cultivated in the Mediterranean region.

== Taxonomy and synonyms ==
Thymus citriodorus has had many different names over time, including Thymus × citriodorus, Thymus fragrantissimus, Thymus serpyllum citratus, Thymus serpyllum citriodorum, and more. It was also believed at one time that the plant was a hybrid of European garden origin, between Thymus pulegioides and Thymus vulgaris. DNA analysis has shown that T. citriodorus is not part of the DNA tree that includes T. pulegioides and T. vulgaris. Still, in a different study, the authors analyzed different Thymus species using molecular characterization with inter-simple sequence repeat markers and clustered together T. vulgaris and T. citriodorus. The hybrid status is also repeatedly presented by the scientific community, accepted by the nursery trade, and by the Royal Botanic Kew Gardens, London UK, that accepts and adopts the hybrid status.

== Cultivars ==
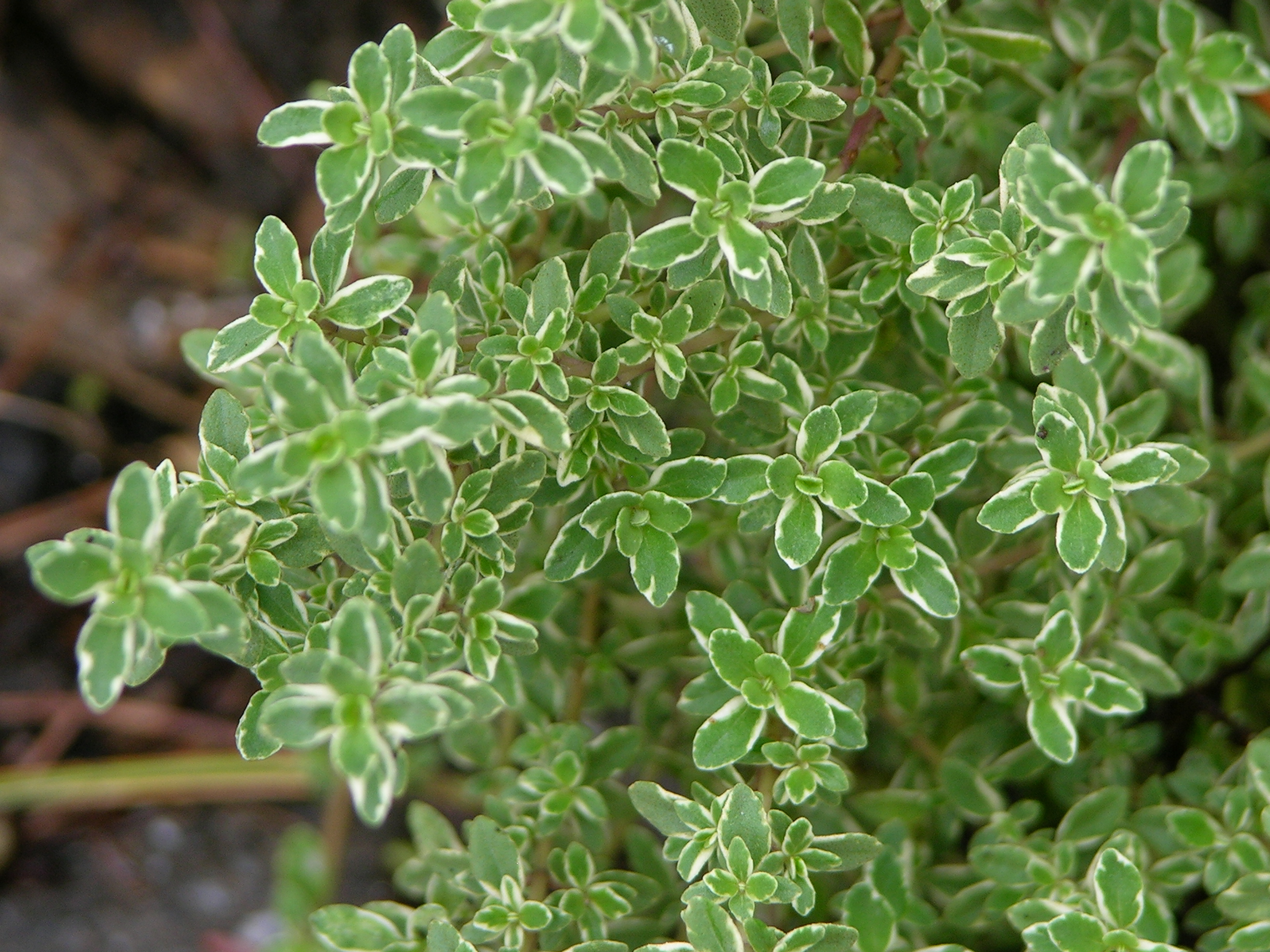
'Variegata' - Golden lemon thyme.

Cultivars are selected for foliage color, and aromas of different citrus fruits. The following are sold by various nurseries, often under the synonyms, so scientific naming is not reliable:

- Lemon Supreme — Light mauve flowers on vigorous plants with much richer lemon scent than that of most lemon thymes.
- ‘Silver-Edged’ (Silver-Edged Lemon Thyme) — Silver-edged green leaves; pink flowers.
- Creeping Golden Lemon — Shiny dark green lemon-scented leaves variegated in gold; lavender flower spikes.
- Orange Thyme— orange, unusually low growing.
- Lime Thyme — mounding ground cover with bright chartreuse green leaves, slightly to powerfully lime scented and flavored leaves, lavender-pink flowers.
