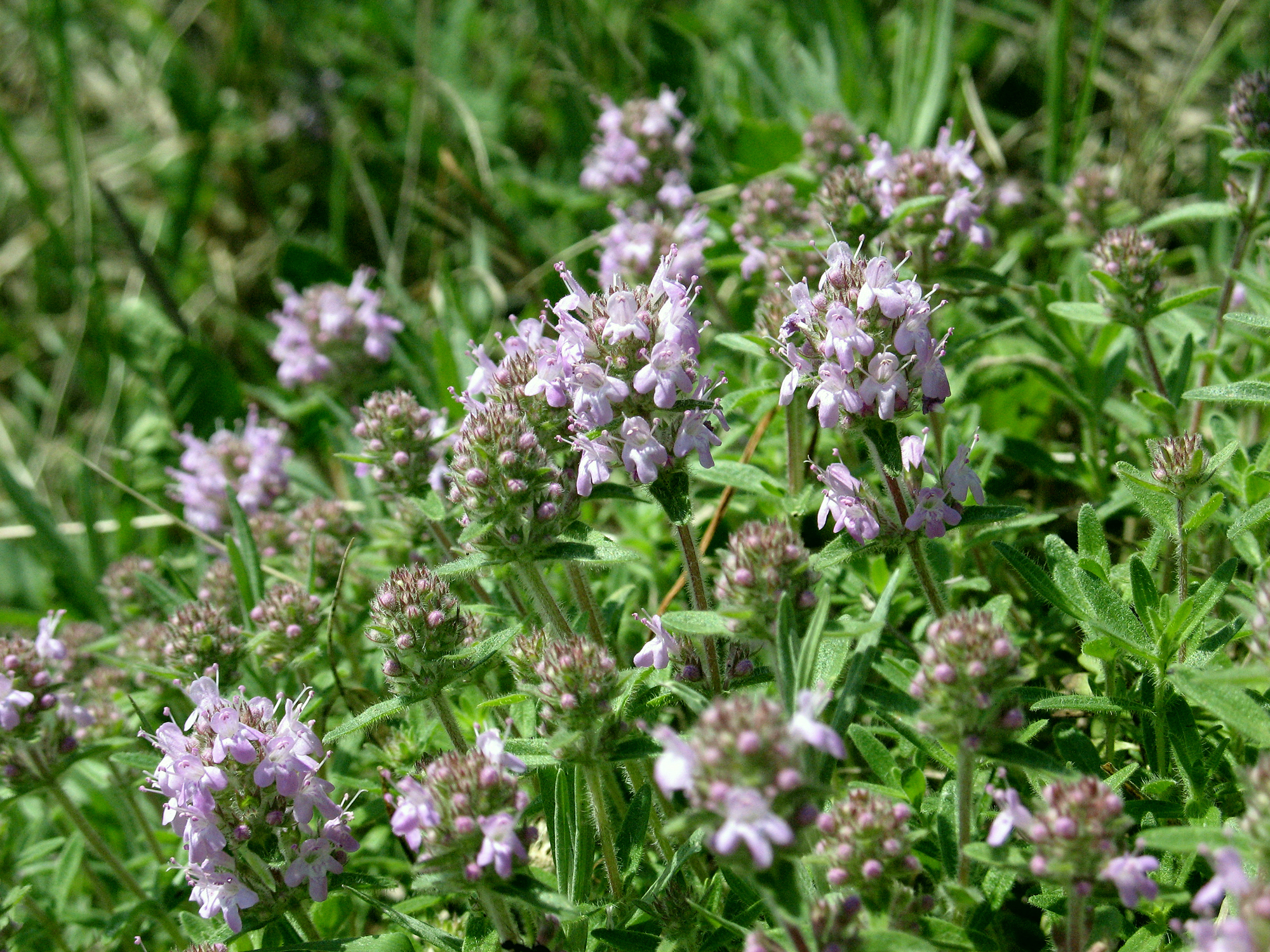

Scientific classification
- Kingdom: Plantae
- Clade: Tracheophytes
- Clade: Angiosperms
- Clade: Eudicots
- Clade: Asterids
- Order: Lamiales
- Family: Lamiaceae
- Genus: Thymus
- Species: T. pannonicus

Binomial name
- Thymus pannonicus All.

= Thymus pannonicus =

Species of flowering plant

Thymus pannonicus, known by its common name Hungarian thyme or Eurasian thyme, is a perennial herbaceous plant, distributed in central and eastern Europe and Russia. It grows over open dry meadows, grasslands, and rocks.

In Serbia, this plant species contributes to several xerothermous grass formations which develop on warm, dry silicate terrains at altitude above 160 m (520 ft), mostly over plains or mild slopes, on acidic soils derived from crystalline albite-muscovite schist and gneiss-like granite. In southern Banat (Serbia), the dried herb is used to make herbal tea drinks, owing to its lemon-like scent. Fresh leaves are used for aromatisation of homemade jams, candies and similar confections. Traditionally, it is used also for coughs and other respiratory complaints, as well as certain gastrointestinal disorders.

== Chemical composition ==
According to Karuza-Stojaković et al., the principal constituents of T. pannonicus essential oil from southern parts of Vojvodina province (northern Serbia) were terpinyl acetate, terpinen-4-ol, thymol, carvacrol, and geranyl acetate (listed in order of descending quantity). Recent comprehensive studies of chemical variability in hydrodistilled essential oils of different wild growing and cultivated populations of T. pannonicus from Hungary, as well as supercritical fluid extracts of various Lamiaceae species, confirmed that high concentrations of both thymol and p-cymene are the main chemosystematic attributes of T. pannonicus essential oil. Further research efforts of Pluhár Zs. et al. on the volatile oil composition of T. pannonicus from nineteen different localities of Hungary, confirmed a significant essential oil polymorphism in this plant species, as twelve different chemovarieties were determined, namely: thymol, thymol/p-cymene, thymol/p-cymene/γ-terpinene, thymol/p-cymene/neral, thymol/p-cymene/γ-terpinene/β-bisabolene, thymol/p-cymene/isoborneol/γ-terpinene, thymol/linalyl acetate/γ-terpinene/α-cubebene, p-cymene/geraniol/linalyl acetate, linalyl acetate/geranyl acetate, germacrene D/β-caryophyllene, caryophyllene oxide/α-cubebene/linalool, and germacrene D/β-caryophyllene/farnesol.

On the other hand, a T. pannonicus population, which is located over the southern slopes of Vršac Mountains in southern Banat (Vojvodina province, Serbia) was characterised by exceptionally high percentage of oxygenated monoterpenes (91.75%). The most abundant components of its essential oil were identified as geranial (41.42%, w/w) and neral (29.61%, w/w), the mixture of which is frequently referred to as citral.

== Biological activity ==
The antimicrobial activity of essential oil was evaluated using the agar disc diffusion and broth microdilution methods against Staphylococcus aureus, Enterococcus faecalis, Pseudomonas aeruginosa, Escherichia coli, two strains of Klebsiella pneumoniae and two strains of Candida albicans. The essential oil exhibited in vitro antimicrobial activity to varying degrees against all tested strains. The maximum activity of T. pannonicus oil was observed against E. coli, S. aureus and both tested strains of C. albicans (MIC = 50 μl/ml, each). Moderate activity was observed against P. aeruginosa and one of the tested strains of K. pneumoniae (MIC = 200 μl/ml), while E. faecalis and the other strain of K. pneumoniae expressed a higher degree of resistance (MIC > 200 μl/ml))
