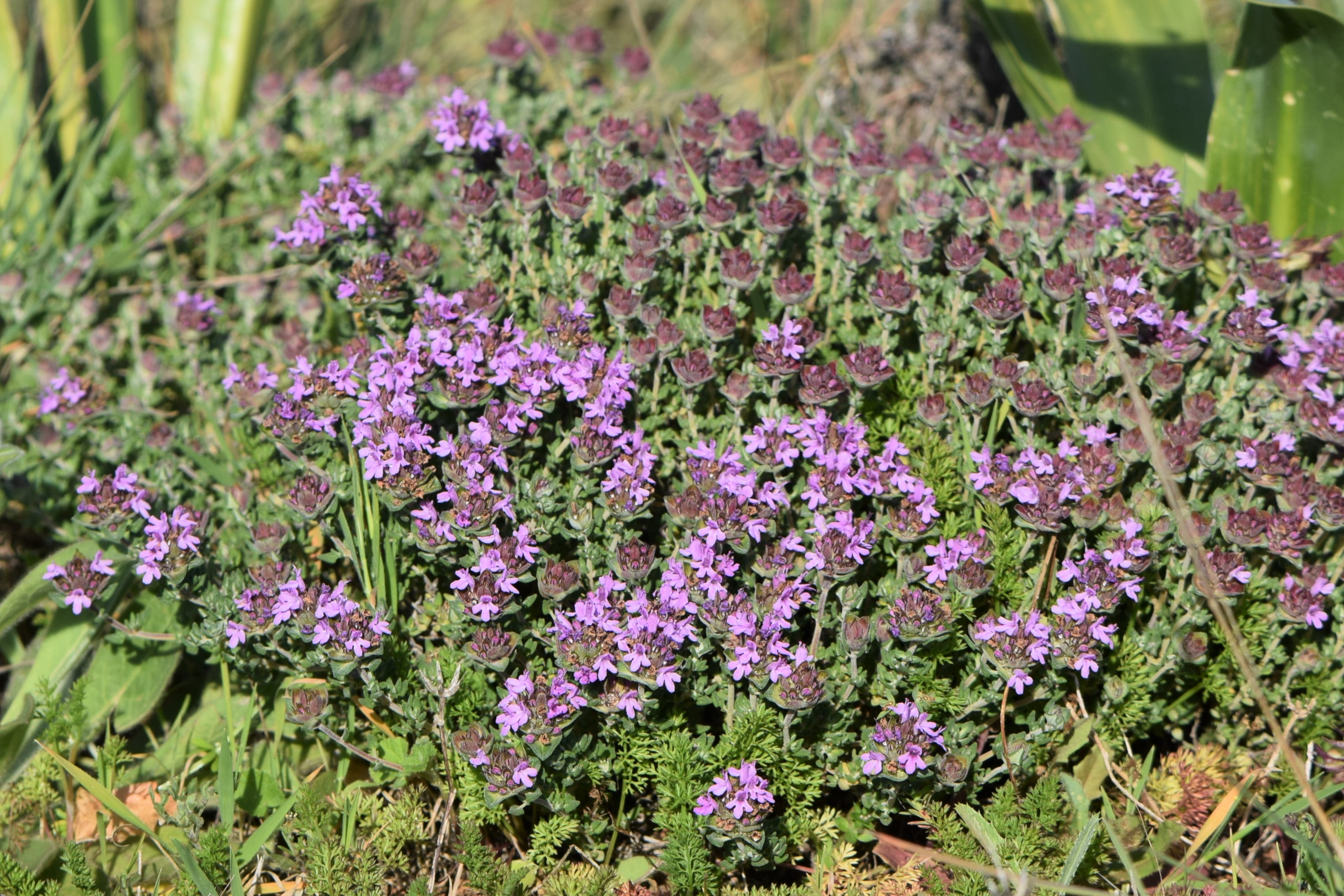

Conservation status
- Near Threatened (IUCN 3.1)

Scientific classification
- Kingdom: Plantae
- Clade: Tracheophytes
- Clade: Angiosperms
- Clade: Eudicots
- Clade: Asterids
- Order: Lamiales
- Family: Lamiaceae
- Genus: Thymus
- Species: T. camphoratus

Binomial name
- Thymus camphoratus Hoffmanns. & Link

Synonyms
- Thymus camphoratus subsp. congestus F.M.Vázquez, Pinto Gomes & Paiva Ferr; Thymus algarbiensis Lange; Thymus mastichina var. camphoratus (Hoffmanns. & Link) Malag.

= Thymus camphoratus =

Species of flowering plant

Thymus camphoratus (locally known as Tomilho do Mar) is a species of flowering plant in the mint family, Lamiaceae. It is endemic to southwest Portugal.

== Description ==
Thymus camphoratus is an erect subshrub 15–30 cm (6–12 in) in height. Young stems have a quadrangular section, with very short hairs. The leaves are 6–8 by 2–4.5 millimetres (1/4–5/16 by 1/16–3/16 in), ovate-triangular or rhomboidal, revolute in the upper half, acute or subobtuse, with whitish tomentose underside, with glabrescent or pubescent upper surface, densely covered with yellowish spheroidal glands. The inflorescence is 10–15 mm (3/8–9/16 in) in diameter, capituliform. Bracts are 7–9 by 5–8 mm (1/4–3/8 by 3/16–5/16 in), broadly ovate, often pale pinkish or reddish, hairy, with scattered spheroidal glands, glandular hairs and marked veins on the underside. The calyx is 4–6 mm (3/16–1/4 in), flared; upper teeth are 0.7–1 mm (1/32–3/64 in), equal, not ciliated. Flowers are 5–8 mm (3/16–5/16 in), pink or purple; lower lip with large, subequal lobes. It has purple, exerted anthers. The fruits are 0.7–0.9 mm x 0.6–0.7 mm, ellipsoid and dark brown. It has 15 pairs of chromosomes (2n = 30).

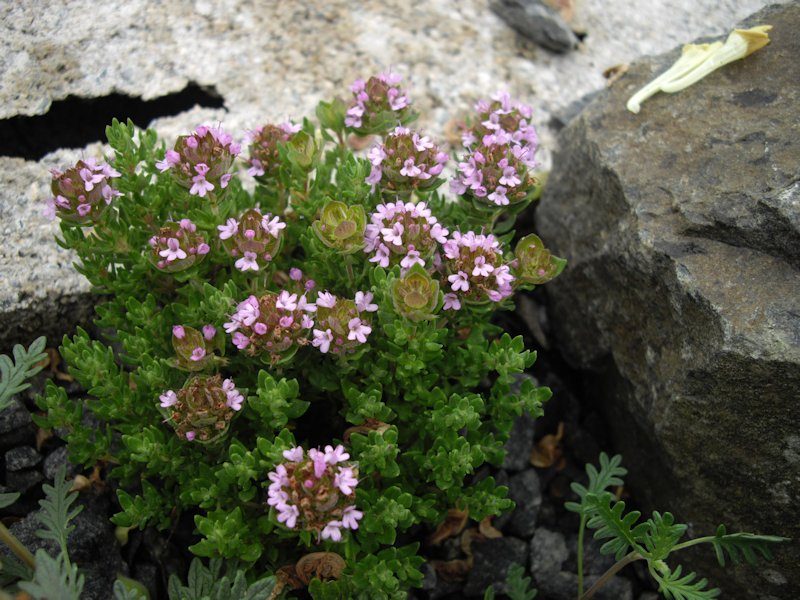
Flowering specimen

== Distribution and habitat ==
Thymus camphoratus is native to southwest Portugal, particularly in the Southwest Alentejo and Vicentine Coast Natural Park. It inhabits heathlands and xerophilic scrub on stabilized dunes of limestone-based sands, always close to the coast.
