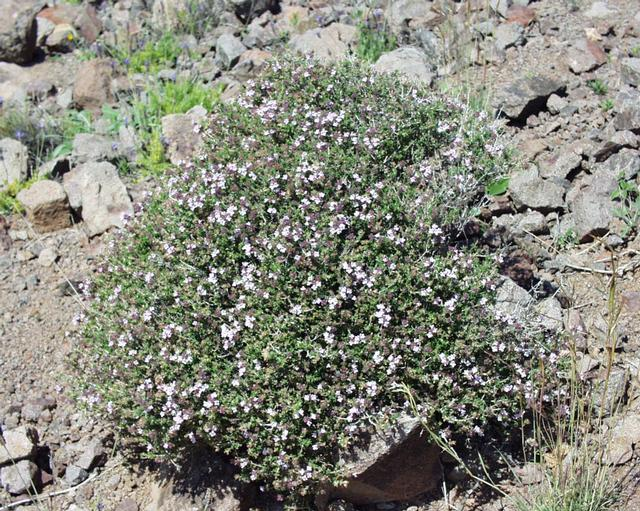

Conservation status
- Least Concern (IUCN 2.3)

Scientific classification
- Kingdom: Plantae
- Clade: Tracheophytes
- Clade: Angiosperms
- Clade: Eudicots
- Clade: Asterids
- Order: Lamiales
- Family: Lamiaceae
- Genus: Thymus
- Species: T. vulgaris

Binomial name
- Thymus vulgaris L.

= Thymus vulgaris =

Species of flowering plant

Thymus vulgaris (common thyme, German thyme, garden thyme or just thyme) is a species of flowering plant in the mint family, Lamiaceae.

== Description ==
The plant grows to 15–30 centimetres (6–12 in) tall and 40 cm (16 in) wide, forming a woody, evergreen subshrub with small and highly aromatic grey-green leaves, as well as clusters of purple or pink flowers in early summer.

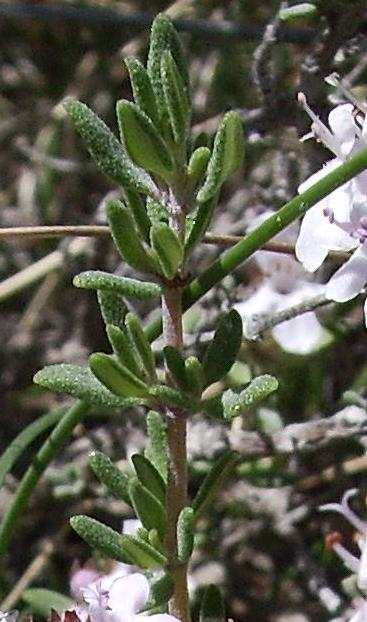
Shoot

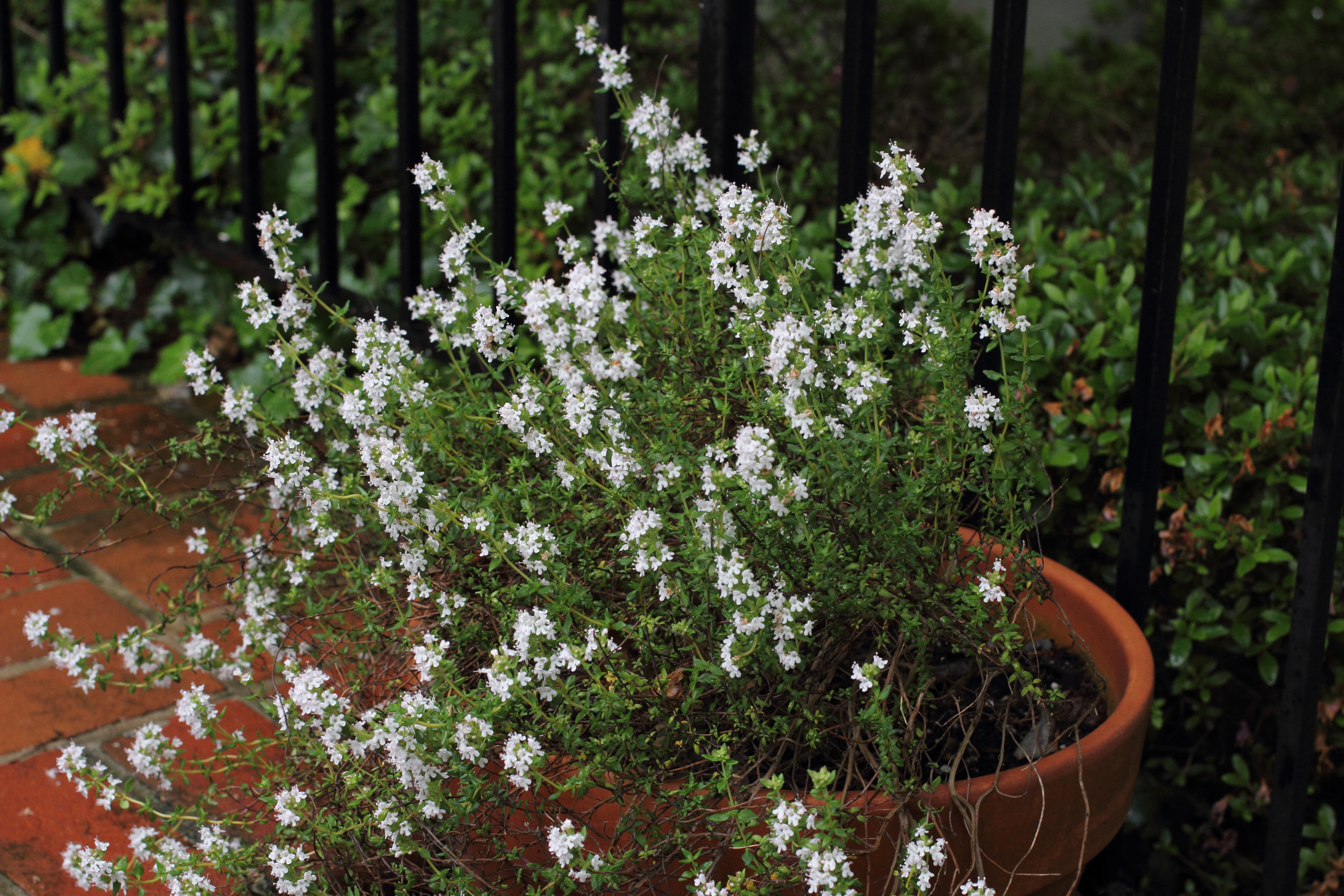
Specimen in bloom

== Etymology ==
The Latin specific epithet vulgaris means 'common' in the sense of 'widespread'.

== Distribution and habitat ==
The species is native to southern Europe from the western Mediterranean to southern Italy.

== Uses ==
It is useful in the garden as groundcover, where it can be short-lived, but is easily propagated from cuttings. It is also the main source of the herb thyme, used as an ingredient in cooking and as a herbal medicine. It is slightly spicier than oregano and sweeter than sage.

== Cultivars ==
Numerous cultivars and hybrids have been developed for ornamental purposes. Nomenclature can be very confusing. French, German and English varieties vary by leaf shape and colour and essential oils. The many cultivars include 'Argenteus' (silver thyme).

The cultivar 'Silver Queen', with white-margined leaves, has gained the Royal Horticultural Society's Award of Garden Merit.

== See also ==
- Thymol – Chemical compound found in plants including thyme

== Bibliography ==
- L. H. Bailey; Manual of Cultivated Plants.
- M. Easter; International Thymus Register and Checklist.
