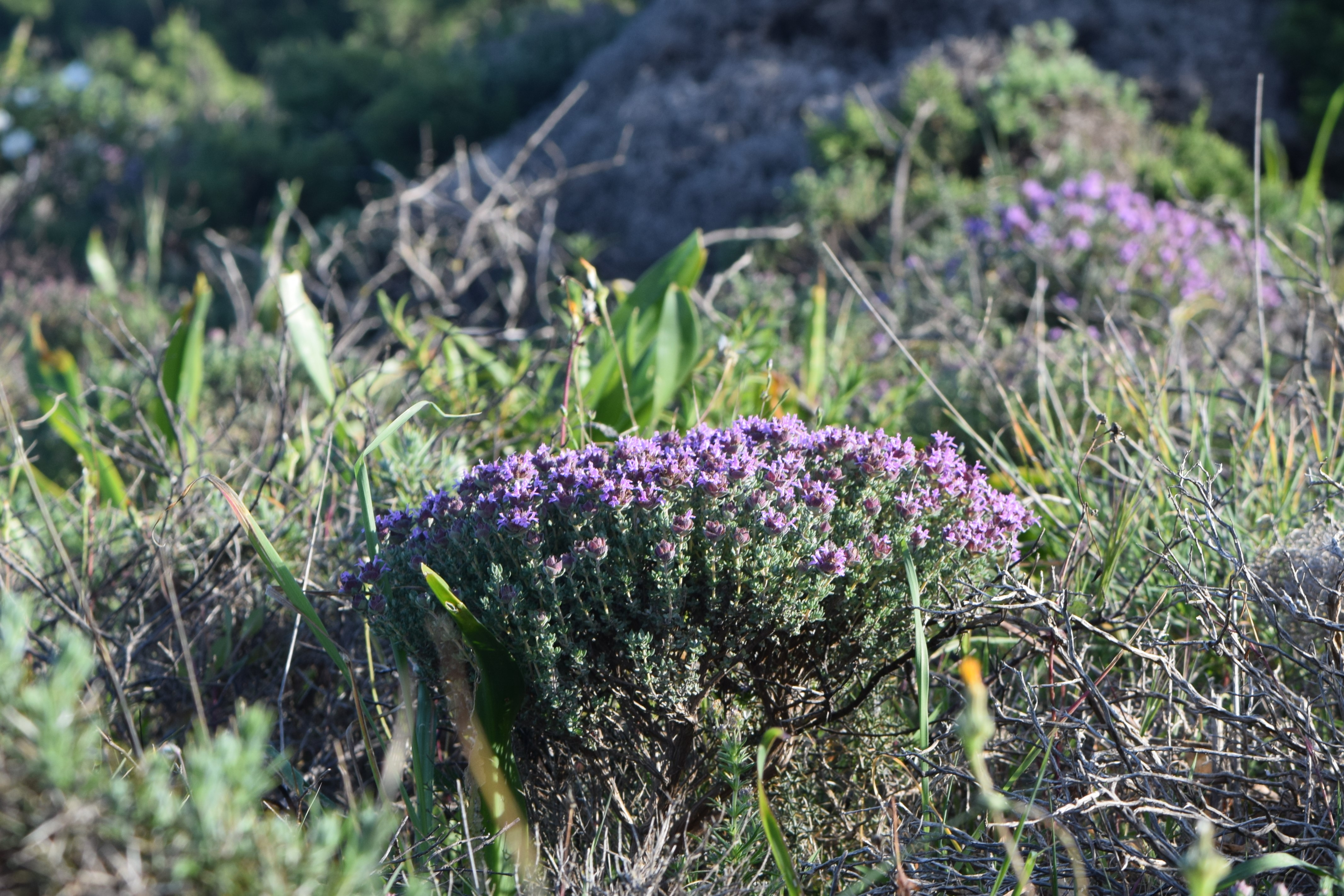
- Thymus camphoratus

Scientific classification
- Kingdom: Plantae
- Clade: Tracheophytes
- Clade: Angiosperms
- Clade: Eudicots
- Clade: Asterids
- Order: Lamiales
- Family: Lamiaceae
- Subfamily: Nepetoideae
- Tribe: Mentheae
- Genus: Thymus; L.

Type species
- Thymus vulgaris L.

Synonyms
- Cephalotos Adans.; Mastichina Mill.; Serpyllum Mill.

= Thymus (plant) =

Family of shrubs

The genus Thymus (/ˈtaɪməs/ TY-məs; thymes) contains about 350 species of aromatic perennial herbaceous plants and subshrubs in the family Lamiaceae. It is native to the Mediterranean area of Europe, North Africa and Turkey.

Several members of the genus are cultivated as culinary herbs or ornamentals, when they are also called thyme after its best-known species, Thymus vulgaris or common thyme.

== Description ==
The plants grow up to 40 centimetres (16 in) tall. The stems tend to be narrow or even wiry. The leaves are evergreen in most species, arranged in opposite pairs, oval, entire, and small, 4–20 millimetres (1/8–3/4 in) long, and usually aromatic. Thyme flowers are in dense terminal heads with an uneven calyx, with the upper lip three-lobed, and are yellow, white, or purple.

== Classification ==
A considerable amount of confusion has existed in the naming of thymes. Many nurseries use common names rather than binomial names, which can lead to mix-ups. For example golden thyme, lemon thyme, and creeping thyme are all common names for more than one cultivar. Some confusion remains over the naming and taxonomy of some species, and Margaret Easter (who holds the NCCPG National Plant Collection of thymes in the UK) has compiled a list of synonyms for cultivated species and cultivars.

The most common classification is that used by Jalas, in eight sections:

- Micantes: Iberian Peninsula, Madeira and the Azores, includes T. caespititius
- Mastichina: Iberian Peninsula, includes T. mastichina
- Piperella: Monotypic section confined to the vicinity of Valencia, Spain
- Teucrioides: Balkan Peninsula
- Pseudothymbra: Iberian Peninsula and north Africa, includes T. cephalotos, T. longiflorus and T. membranaceus
- Thymus: Western Mediterranean region, includes T. camphoratus, T. carnosus, T. hyemalis, T. vulgaris and T. zygis
- Hyphodromi: Throughout the Mediterranean region, includes T. cilicicus and T. comptus
- Serpyllum: The largest section, throughout whole region, apart from Madeira and Azores, includes T. comosus, T. doerfleri, T. herba-barona, T. longicaulis, T. pannonicus, T. praecox, T. pulegioides, T. quinquecostatus, T. richardii, T. serpyllum, T. sibthorpii and T. thracicus

=== Selected species ===
- Thymus adamovicii
- Thymus altaicus
- Thymus amurensis
- Thymus boissieri
- Thymus bracteosus
- Thymus broussonetii
- Thymus caespititius
- Thymus camphoratus
- Thymus capitatus
- Thymus capitellatus
- Thymus camphoratus
- Thymus carnosus
- Thymus cephalotus
- Thymus cherlerioides
- Thymus ciliatus
- Thymus cilicicus
- Thymus cimicinus
- Thymus citriodorus (Thymus × citriodorus) syn. T. fragrantissimus, T. serpyllum citratus, T. serpyllum citriodorum. – citrus thyme
- Thymus comosus
- Thymus comptus
- Thymus curtus
- Thymus decussatus
- Thymus disjunctus
- Thymus doerfleri
- Thymus dubjanskyi
- Thymus glabrescens
- Thymus herba-barona
- Thymus hirsutus
- Thymus hyemalis
- Thymus inaequalis
- Thymus integer
- Thymus lanuginosus, syn. T. serpyllum – woolly thyme
- Thymus leucospermus
- Thymus leucotrichus
- Thymus longicaulis
- Thymus longiflorus
- Thymus mandschuricus
- Thymus marschallianus
- Thymus mastichina
- Thymus membranaceus
- Thymus mongolicus
- Thymus moroderi
- Thymus nervulosus
- Thymus nummularis
- Thymus odoratissimus
- Thymus pallasianus
- Thymus pallidus
- Thymus pannonicus
- Thymus praecox – creeping thyme
- Thymus proximus
- Thymus pseudolanuginosus, syn. T. serpyllum – woolly thyme
- Thymus pulegioides – lemon thyme
- Thymus quinquecostatus - Japanese thyme
- Thymus richardii
- Thymus satureioides
- Thymus serpyllum
- Thymus sibthorpii
- Thymus striatus
- Thymus thracicus – lavender thyme
- Thymus villosus
- Thymus vulgaris – common thyme
- Thymus zygis

== Distribution and habitat ==
The genus is native to temperate regions in Europe, North Africa and Asia. Thymus is particularly concentrated in Iran, attributed to the country's diverse climate and location both in terms of geography and topography. Thymus quinquecostatus Celak is present in Korea.

== Ecology ==
Thymus species are used as food plants by the larvae of some butterfly and moth insect species, including Chionodes distinctella and the Coleophora case-bearers C. lixella, C. niveicostella, C. serpylletorum, and C. struella (the last three feeding exclusively on Thymus).

== Cultivation ==
Thymus is cultivated for its fragrant leaves and used as a culinary herb in Mediterranean cooking.

Mrs Margaret Easter was appointed International Cultivar Registration Authority for the genus in 2007.

== Uses ==
Thyme is packed with phytonutrients, vitamins and minerals. Thyme species such as T. fedtschenkoi, T. pubescens, and T. transcaucasicus have large amounts of the essential oils thymol and carvacrol. These Thymus species are used for herbal tea, spice, and medicine. The therapeutic effect of thyme is largely attributed to these essential oils belonging to the terpenoids family. Thyme is considered amongst the most consequential medicinal plants due to its substantial amount of bioactive compounds. Thyme has been used to treat diabetes, cold and chest infections, and coughs. In conventional Korean medicine, T. quinquecostatus Celak has been used to treat cancer, hepatic disease, and constipation.

== Sources ==
- Easter M. Thymus
- University of Melbourne: Thymus
