= Oregano (disambiguation) =

Oregano (Origanum vulgare) is an herb commonly used in cooking.

Oregano may also refer to:

== Plants ==
- Lippia graveolens, Mexican oregano
- Lippia micromera (Spanish thyme), a species in the Lippia genus
- Plectranthus amboinicus, Cuban oregano
- Poliomintha bustamanta (Mexican oregano), in the Poliomintha genus
- Poliomintha longiflora (Mexican oregano), in the Poliomintha genus

== Other ==
- OREGANO 1973 implementation of ALGOL 68 programming language
- Oregano (software), a program for simulation of electrical circuits
- Oregano (web browser), a web browser
- Oregano oil, an oil extracted from the herb Oregano
