= List of RISC OS bundled applications =

A number of RISC OS bundled applications are delivered with purchased versions of the operating system. Some are provided in ROM or pre-installed on hard disk or equivalent, with others being supplied on removable media such as SD card.

Such applications vary between versions.

== RISC OS bundled applications ==
=== Typically bundled with the OS ===
Title	Purpose	First inclusion (OS version)	Vendor
Access+	peer to peer network management application	V3.60	Acorn
Alarm	clock, with alarm functionality	<=V2	Acorn
Blocks	Tetris clone		Acorn
Calc	basic calculator	V1 (Arthur)	Acorn
Chars	character insertion	V1 (Arthur)	Acorn
ChangeFSI	bitmap graphic conversion and enhancement		Acorn
Clock	analogue clock	V1 (Arthur)	Acorn
CloseUp	screen magnifier		Acorn
Configure	customise computer settings	V1 (Arthur)	Acorn
Draw	vector graphics editor	<=V2	Acorn
Edit	text editor, support for editing tokenised BASIC programs	<=V2	Acorn
Flasher	locate the caret		Acorn
FontPrint	font conversion (Acorn to Postscript)		Acorn
Help	context-sensitive help	V1 (Arthur)	Acorn
HForm	hard disc formatter	V1 (Arthur)	Acorn
Hopper	game similar to Frogger		Simon Foster
Madness	desktop toy		Acorn
Maestro	simple scorewriter, with playback	<=V2	Acorn
Magnifier	screen magnifier		Acorn
MemNow	live memory use display		Acorn
Meteors	Asteroids clone		Neil Raine
MineHunt	mine sweeper clone		Paul LeBeau
OmniClient	universal front end for networking shares	V5.00 (previously sold separately)	ANT
Paint	basic pixel-based drawing	<=V2	Acorn
Patch	application compatibility patcher		Acorn
Patience	card game	<=V2	Acorn
PrintEdit	printer definition editor		Acorn
Printers	printer manager		Acorn
Puzzle	sliding puzzle	<=V2	Acorn
ResetBoot	restore machine to factory ship state		Acorn
SciCalc	scientific calculator		Acorn
ShowScrap	locate temporary files		Acorn
SparkFS	file compression		David Pilling
Squash	file compression	<=V3	Acorn
T1ToFont	font conversion (Postscript Type 1 to Acorn)		Acorn
Usage	system monitor	<=A3010 (on floppy)	Ran Mokady
BBC Basic V & VI	programming languages, with inbuilt assembler	All versions?	Acorn

=== Bundled with specific hardware, including optional software packs ===
Title	Purpose	First inclusion (Machine model)	Vendor
BookMaker	address book		
CDVDBurnLite	optical disc burning		hubersn Software
Fireworkz	office suite		Colton
FTPc	FTP client		
Lander	demo version of the game Zarch		Acorn
LanManFS	network file system		
Mailman	basic email client		Acorn
Oregano	web browser		Oregan Networks
Update Watcher	upgrade manager		Castle Technology
PDF	Xpdf port (PDF viewer)		
Writer	cut-down version of EasiWriter		Icon Technology
65Host	BBC Micro emulator		Acorn
65Tube	65C02 second processor emulator		Acorn
1st Word Plus	word processor	A3010 Learning Curve	
Amazing Maths	education	A3010 Learning Curve	Cambridgeshire Software House
Acorn DTP	desktop publishing	A3010 Learning Curve	Acorn (with others)
Doris The Dotty Dog	education	A3010 Learning Curve	Sherston Software
Explore With Flossy The Frog	education	A3010 Learning Curve	4Mation
Genesis Plus	presentation program	A3010 Learning Curve	
A Mouse in Holland	education	A3010 Learning Curve	4Mation
PC Emulator	PC emulator, with DR-DOS	A3010 Learning Curve	
TalkWrite	word processor	A3010 Learning Curve	Icon Technology
Selected games	gaming	A3010 Learning Curve	
