= Oregan =

Oregan may refer to:

- Oregan Networks
- Oregan Hoskins
- Oregon
- Oregano
