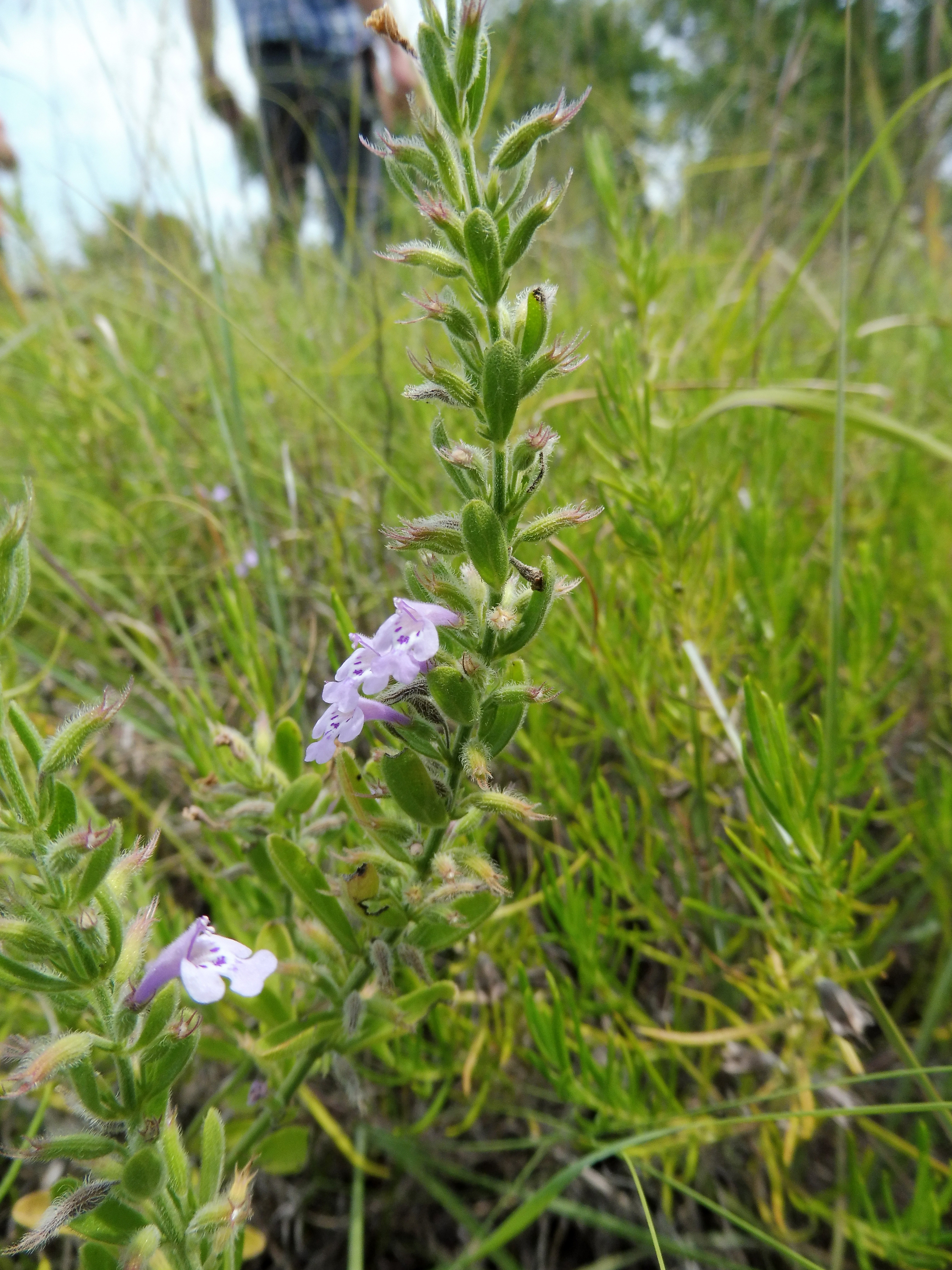

Conservation status
- Secure (NatureServe)

Scientific classification
- Kingdom: Plantae
- Clade: Tracheophytes
- Clade: Angiosperms
- Clade: Eudicots
- Clade: Asterids
- Order: Lamiales
- Family: Lamiaceae
- Genus: Hedeoma
- Species: H. reverchonii

Binomial name
- Hedeoma reverchonii (A.Gray) A.Gray

= Hedeoma reverchonii =

Species of flowering plant

Hedeoma reverchonii, commonly called Reverchon's false pennyroyal, is a species of flowering plant in the mint family (Lamiaceae). It is native to the south central region of the United States, where it is primarily found in Texas, extending into small areas of Arkansas and Oklahoma. Its natural habitat is on open, calcareous rock outcrops.

Hedeoma reverchonii is a robust perennial with a woody base. It produces white or lavender colored flowers in the summer. The crushed plant has an odor of camphor or lemon. This trait helps distinguish Hedeoma reverchonii from the similar-looking Hedeoma drummondii, which is a smaller plant with an aroma of peppermint.

== Taxonomy ==
There are two recognized varieties. They are:

- Hedeoma reverchonii var. reverchonii - More widespread; plants lemon-scented, with larger flowers.
- Hedeoma reverchonii var. serpyllifolium - Restricted to the southern portion of the species's range; plants camphor-scented, with smaller flowers.
