= Pennyrile =

Pennyrile may refer to any of the following:

- the pennyroyal, or European pennyroyal, Mentha pulegium
- the false or American pennyroyal, Hedeoma pulegioides
- most commonly, the geographic area of Kentucky named for the plant, and otherwise known as the Pennyroyal Plateau.
- the Pennyrile Parkway, a Kentucky highway, formerly a toll road, that traverses parts of the plateau and the state's adjacent Western Coal Fields.
