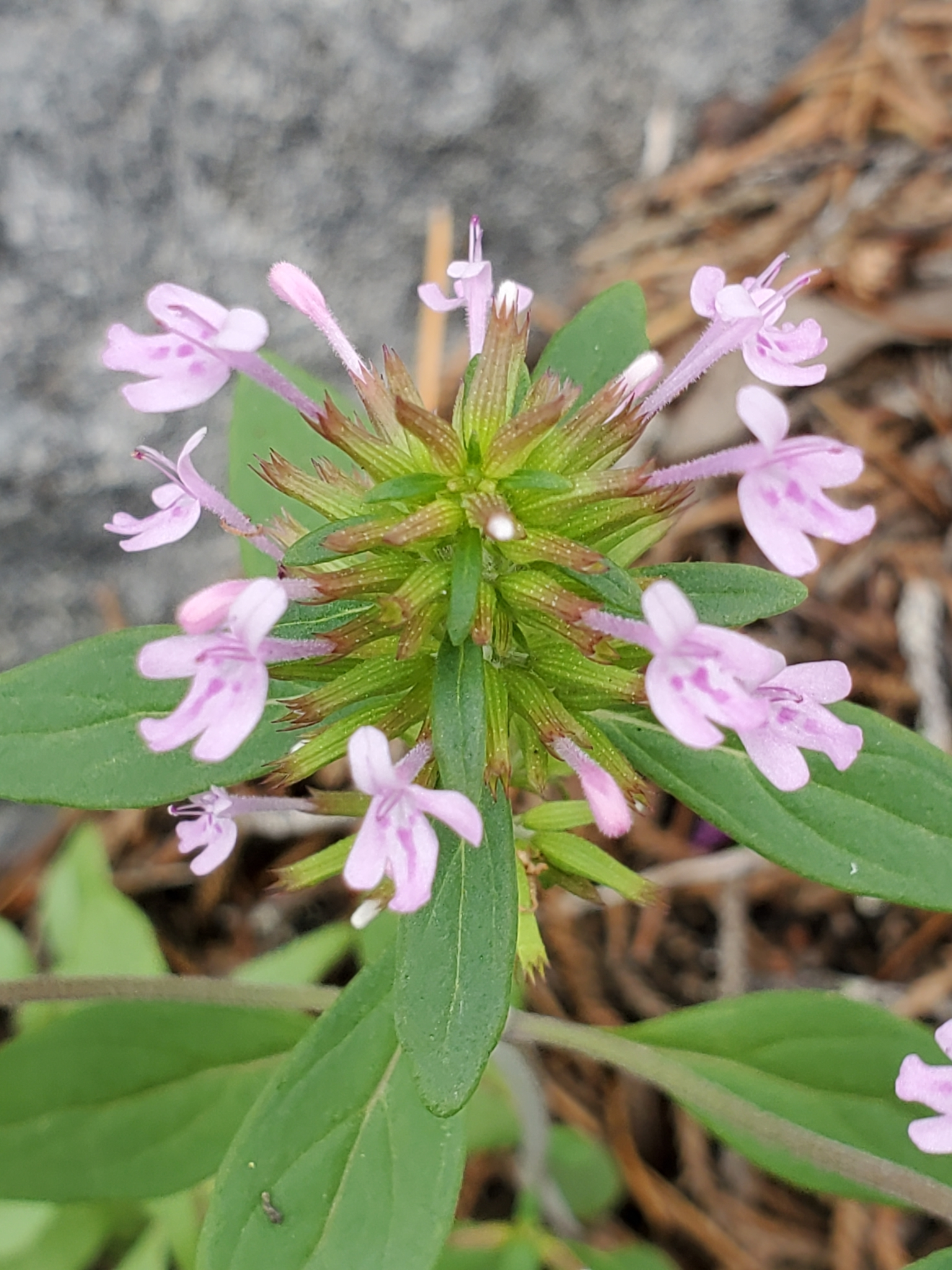

Scientific classification
- Kingdom: Plantae
- Clade: Tracheophytes
- Clade: Angiosperms
- Clade: Eudicots
- Clade: Asterids
- Order: Lamiales
- Family: Lamiaceae
- Genus: Hedeoma
- Species: H. acinoides

Binomial name
- Hedeoma acinoides Scheele

= Hedeoma acinoides =

Species of plant

Hedeoma acinoides, called slender false pennyroyal, annual pennyroyal, or slender hedeoma, is a delicate annual herb in the mint family, found primarily in central Texas.

== Description ==
Hedeoma acinoides is a herb that grows 6–10 inches tall. Leaves are elliptic in shape and grow opposite on the stem. Fine hairs cover the upper half of the stem; the leaves are hairless. The leaves have a citrus scent when crushed and may be purplish at the base. Delicate pink flowers bloom from April to May. The fruit is a nutlet.

== Range ==
Hedeoma acinoides is found in the United States and Mexico.

== Habitat ==
Hedeoma acinoides grows in dry, limestone soils.
