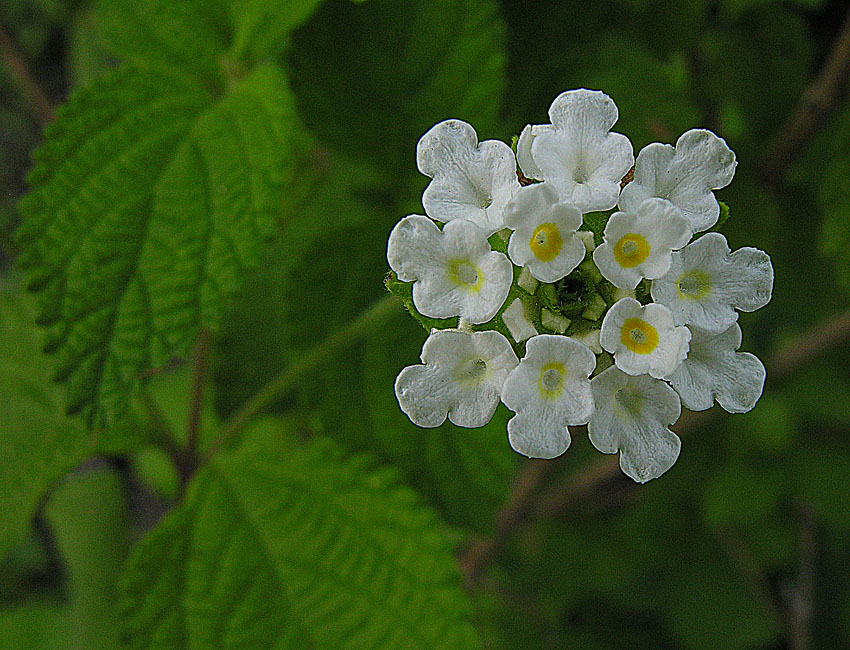

Scientific classification
- Kingdom: Plantae
- Clade: Embryophytes
- Clade: Tracheophytes
- Clade: Angiosperms
- Clade: Eudicots
- Clade: Asterids
- Order: Lamiales
- Family: Verbenaceae
- Genus: Lippia
- Species: L. graveolens

Binomial name
- Lippia graveolens Kunth

Synonyms
- Lippia berlandieri Schauer

= Lippia graveolens =

Species of flowering plant

Lippia graveolens, a species of flowering plant in the verbena or vervain family, Verbenaceae, is native to the southwestern United States (Texas and southern New Mexico), Mexico, and Central America as far south as Nicaragua. Common names include: Mexican oregano, redbrush lippia, orégano cimarrón ('wild oregano'), scented lippia, and scented matgrass. The specific epithet is derived from two Latin words: gravis, meaning 'heavy', and olens, meaning 'smelling'. It is a shrub or small tree, reaching 1–2.7 m (3.3–8.9 ft) in height. Fragrant white or yellowish flowers can be found on the plant throughout the year, especially after rains.

== Uses ==
The leaves are widely used as an herb in Mexico and Central America.

The essential oil of Lippia graveolens contains 0-81% thymol, 0-48% carvacrol, 3-30% para-cymene, and 0-15% eucalyptol. The first two components give the plant a flavor similar to oregano (to which it is not closely related).

== See also ==
- Hedeoma patens, Spanish common name orégano chiquito ('small oregano'); native to the Mexican states of Chihuahua and Coahuila.
- Coleus amboinicus, known as Cuban oregano, orégano poleo ('pennyroyal oregano'), orégano francés ('French oregano'), Mexican mint, Mexican thyme, and many other names. Common throughout the tropics, including Latin America, but probably of eastern-hemisphere origin.
