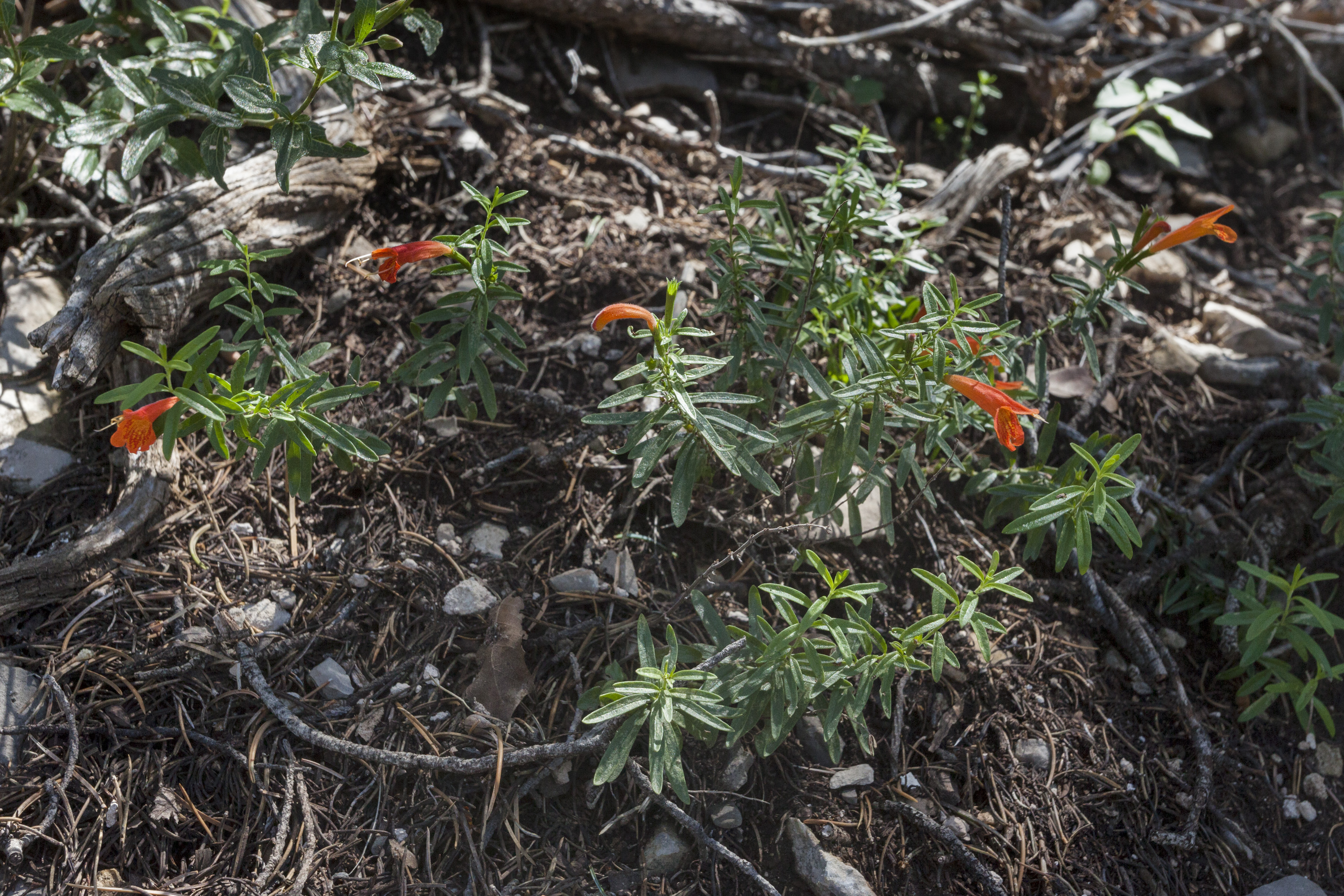

Conservation status
- Imperiled (NatureServe)

Scientific classification
- Kingdom: Plantae
- Clade: Tracheophytes
- Clade: Angiosperms
- Clade: Eudicots
- Clade: Asterids
- Order: Lamiales
- Family: Lamiaceae
- Genus: Hedeoma
- Species: H. todsenii

Binomial name
- Hedeoma todsenii R.S.Irving

= Hedeoma todsenii =

Species of flowering plant

Hedeoma todsenii is a rare species of flowering plant in the family Lamiaceae known by the common name Todsen's pennyroyal, or Todsen's false pennyroyal. It is endemic to New Mexico in the United States, where it occurs in the San Andres and Sacramento Mountains. It is federally listed as an endangered species of the United States.

This plant was discovered on the White Sands Missile Range in 1978 by Thomas K. Todsen (1918-2010) and described to science and named for him the following year. It is a rhizomatous perennial herb growing up to 20 centimeters tall with fragrant lance-shaped leaves. The tubular flowers are red-orange or occasionally yellow in color and bloom in the summer rainy season. Flowers occur rarely, with only 20% of the plants flowering in a given season. The plant reproduces vegetatively, forming wide mats of many clones all arising from the rhizome of one plant. What appears to be a large colony of many stems may actually be a single plant.

The plant grows on steep mountain slopes composed of gypsum and limestone. It occurs in pinyon-juniper woodland habitat dominated by the Colorado Pinyon (Pinus edulis) and one seed juniper (Juniperus monosperma). It grows among grasses such as muhly grass (Muhlenbergia sp.) species. It occurs in shady spots in the habitat where moisture remains for a longer period of time. The rare plant may be a relict species from a time when the region was cooler and not as dry.

There are three occurrences of the plant in the San Andres Mountains and fifteen occurrences in the Sacramento Mountains. The plant, as a relict, may be naturally rare. It reproduces by cloning itself. Flowering occurs rarely, and successful seed set is relatively uncommon. Few pollinators visit the flowers. When a plant does produce fruit, it usually produces only one or two nutlets together, instead of the quartet that is possible. Furthermore, most of the seeds do not germinate.

Threats to the species include its low reproductive rate and genetic diversity, illegal grazing of domestic animals, and damage from insects and other wild animals.
