= Hedeoma diffusa =

Conservation status
- Vulnerable (NatureServe)

Scientific classification
- Kingdom: Plantae
- Clade: Tracheophytes
- Clade: Angiosperms
- Clade: Eudicots
- Clade: Asterids
- Order: Lamiales
- Family: Lamiaceae
- Genus: Hedeoma
- Species: H. diffusa

Binomial name
- Hedeoma diffusa Greene 1898

Species of plant

Hedeoma diffusa is a species of flowering plant in the mint family known by the common names spreading false pennyroyal and Flagstaff false pennyroyal. It is endemic to Arizona in the United States.

This perennial herb has spreading, prostrate stems that form a mat on the ground. The leaves are oppositely arranged. The flowers are blue to lavender in color and are open for about three days. Blooming occurs in May through September.

This plant is limited to northern Arizona, occurring in Navajo, Coconino, and Yavapai Counties. It grows on Kaibab Limestone, in and around rocky cracks and crevices. In Oak Creek Canyon in the Red Rock-Secret Mountain Wilderness Area, sites are considered protected, and most are inaccessible.
