= Hedeoma hyssopifolia =

Conservation status
- Vulnerable (NatureServe)

Scientific classification
- Kingdom: Plantae
- Clade: Tracheophytes
- Clade: Angiosperms
- Clade: Eudicots
- Clade: Asterids
- Order: Lamiales
- Family: Lamiaceae
- Genus: Hedeoma
- Species: H. hyssopifolia

Binomial name
- Hedeoma hyssopifolia A.Gray

Species of flowering plant

Hedeoma hyssopifolia is a flowering plant species within the family Lamiaceae. Common names for Hedeoma hyssopifolia are mock pennyroyal and aromatic false pennyroyal.

== Description ==
Hedeoma hyssopifolia has small lavender bilabiate flowers, with white inner throats that are also spotted with small darker-purple spots. Leaves of the Mock Pennyroyal are thin and opposite-growing.

== Range ==
Hedeoma hyssopifolia is native to southeastern Arizona and southwestern New Mexico in the southwestern United States and to the states of Sonora and Chihuahua in northern Mexico.

== Habitat ==
Rocky slopes and piney forests from 5,000–9,000 feet (1,500–2,700 m) elevation.
