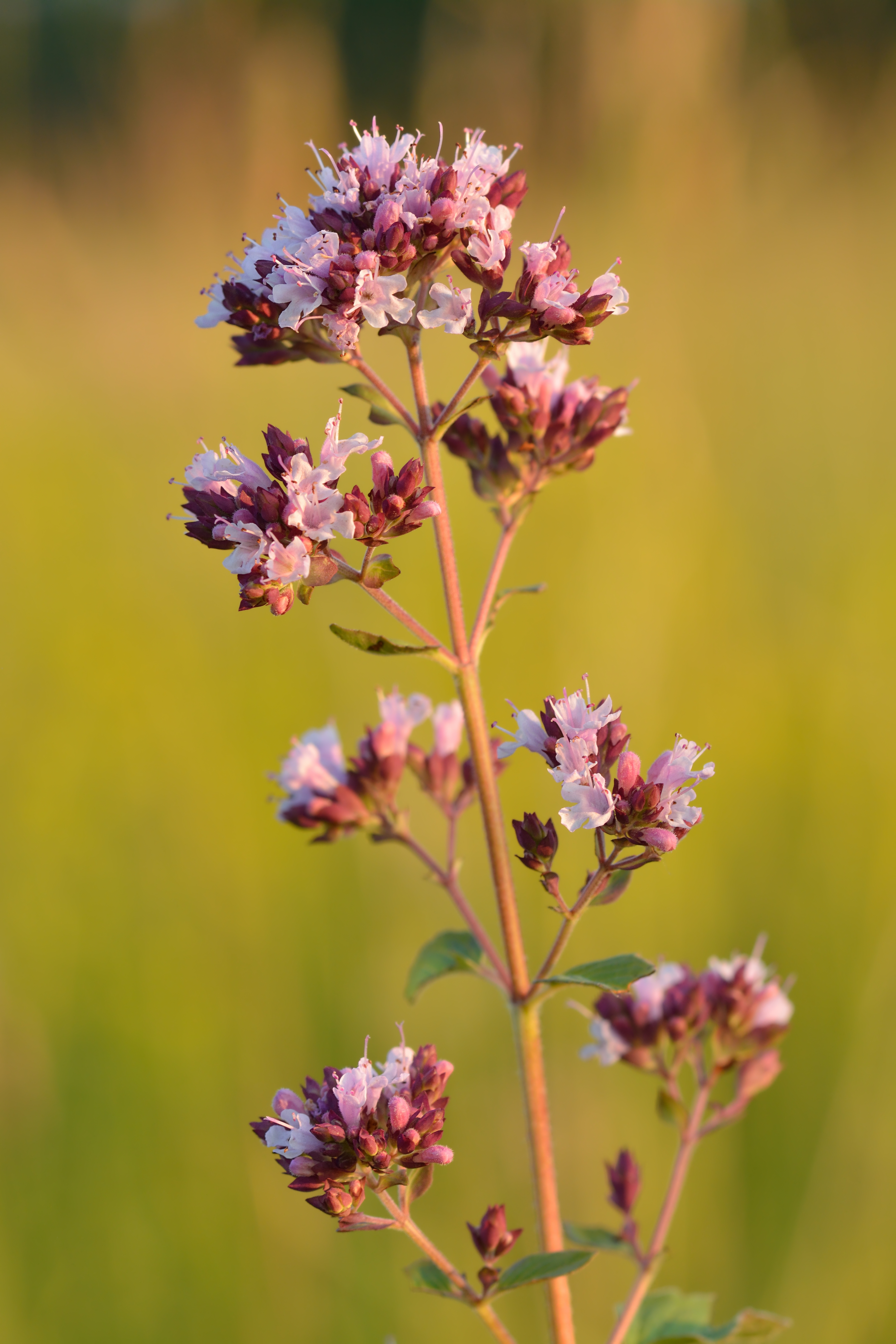

Conservation status
- Least Concern (IUCN 3.1)

Scientific classification
- Kingdom: Plantae
- Clade: Tracheophytes
- Clade: Angiosperms
- Clade: Eudicots
- Clade: Asterids
- Order: Lamiales
- Family: Lamiaceae
- Genus: Origanum
- Species: O. vulgare

Binomial name
- Origanum vulgare Linnaeus

= Oregano =

Species of flowering plant

Oregano (US: /ɔːˈrɛɡənoʊ, ə-/, UK: /ˌɒrɪˈɡɑːnoʊ/; Origanum vulgare), sometimes called wild marjoram, is a species of flowering plant in the mint family, Lamiaceae. It is native to the Mediterranean region but widely naturalised elsewhere in the temperate Northern Hemisphere, particularly the United States and Mexico.

Oregano is a woody perennial plant, growing up to 90 cm (35 in) tall, with opposite leaves 1–4 cm (0.5–1.5 in) long covered with trichome. Young stems are typically square and hairy and become woody with age. The flowers, which can be white, pink or light purple, are 3–4 mm (0.12–0.18 in) long and produced in clustered, erect spikes in summer.

Along with its close relative O. majorana (sweet marjoram), oregano is widely used as a culinary herb. Although once used in folk medicine, there is no clinical evidence that oregano provides any health or anti-disease effects. Oregano is also an ornamental plant, with numerous cultivars bred for varying leaf colour, flower colour and habit.

== Etymology ==
The English word "oregano" is a borrowing of the Spanish orégano, which derives from the Latin orīganum, which itself comes from Classical Greek ὀρίγανον (orī́ganon). The ultimate origin is disputed; some claim it is a compound Greek term that consists of ὄρος (óros) meaning "mountain", and γάνος (gános) meaning "joy" while The Oxford English Dictionary states it is "probably a loanword [as] the plant comes from Africa".

== Description ==
Oregano is a perennial, although it is grown as an annual in colder climates, as it often does not survive the winter.

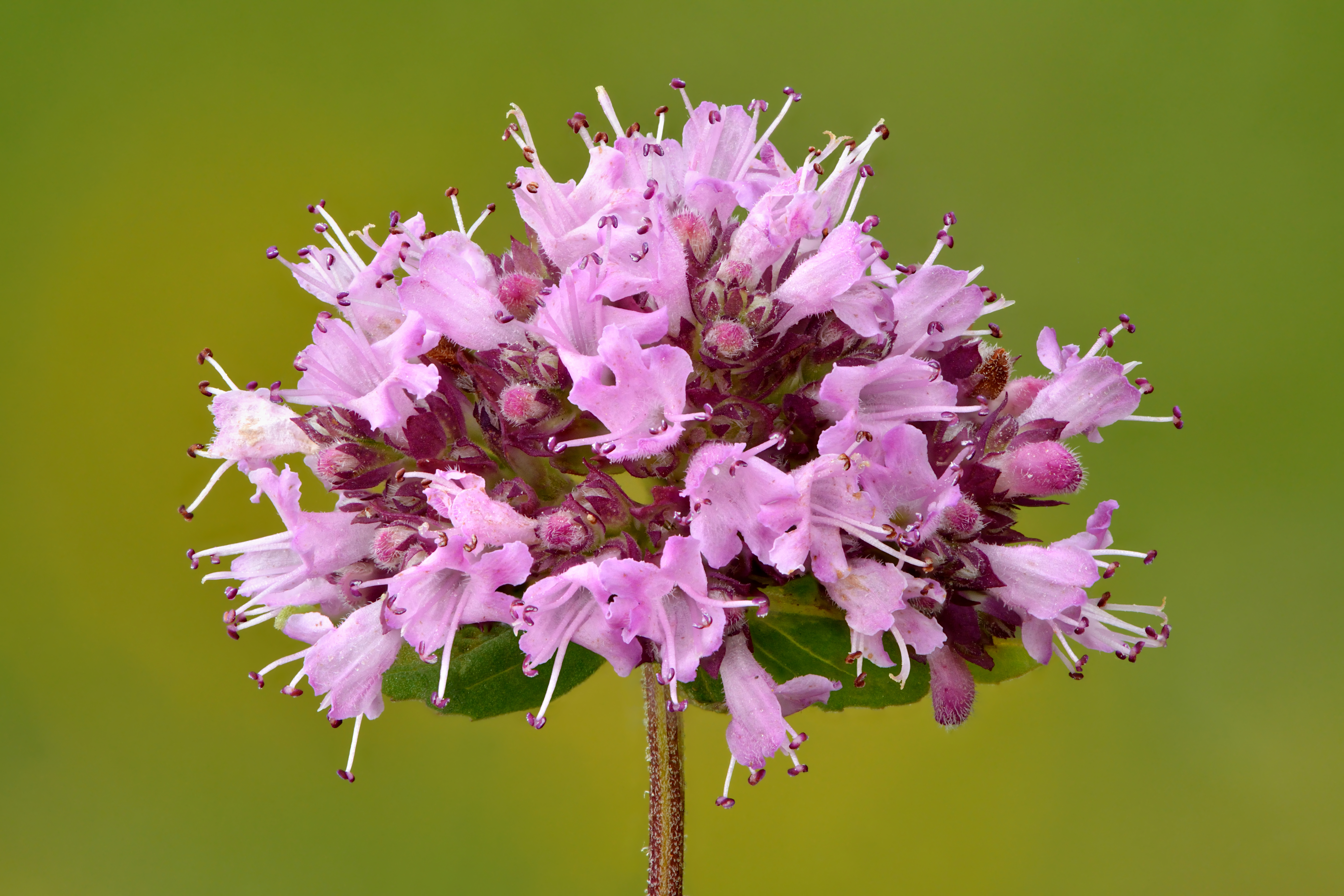
Inflorescence

It grows to 90 centimetres (35 in) tall and 50 cm (20 in) wide. The leaves are spade-shaped and olive-green. The flowers are purple, pink or white, 4–7 cm (1 1/2–2 3/4 in) long and grouped in clusters.

Oregano is related to the herb marjoram, sometimes being referred to as wild marjoram.

=== Chemistry ===
Oregano contains polyphenols, including numerous flavones.

The essential oil of oregano is composed primarily of monoterpenoids and monoterpenes, with the relative concentration of each compound varying widely across geographic origin and other factors. Over 60 different compounds have been identified, with the primary ones being carvacrol and thymol ranging to over 80%, while lesser abundant compounds include p-cymene, γ-terpinene, caryophyllene, spathulenol, germacrene D, β-fenchyl alcohol and δ-terpineol.

Drying of the plant material affects both quantity and distribution of volatile compounds, with methods using higher heat and longer drying times having greater negative impact. A sample of fresh whole plant material found to contain 33 g/kg dry weight (3.1 g/kg wet) decreased to below a third after warm-air convection drying. Much higher concentrations of volatile compounds are achieved towards the end of the growing season.

== Taxonomy ==
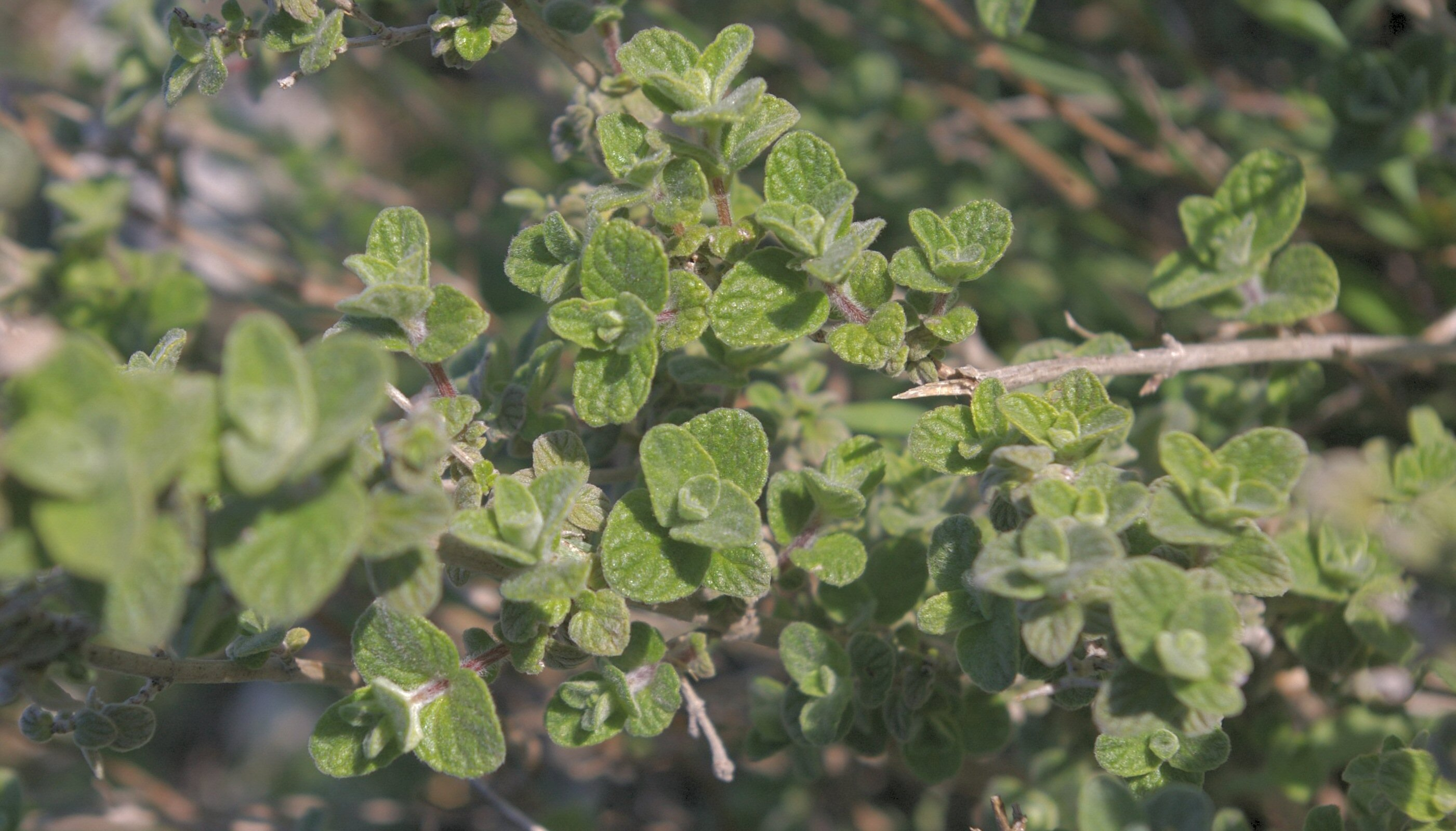
Syrian oregano (Origanum syriacum)

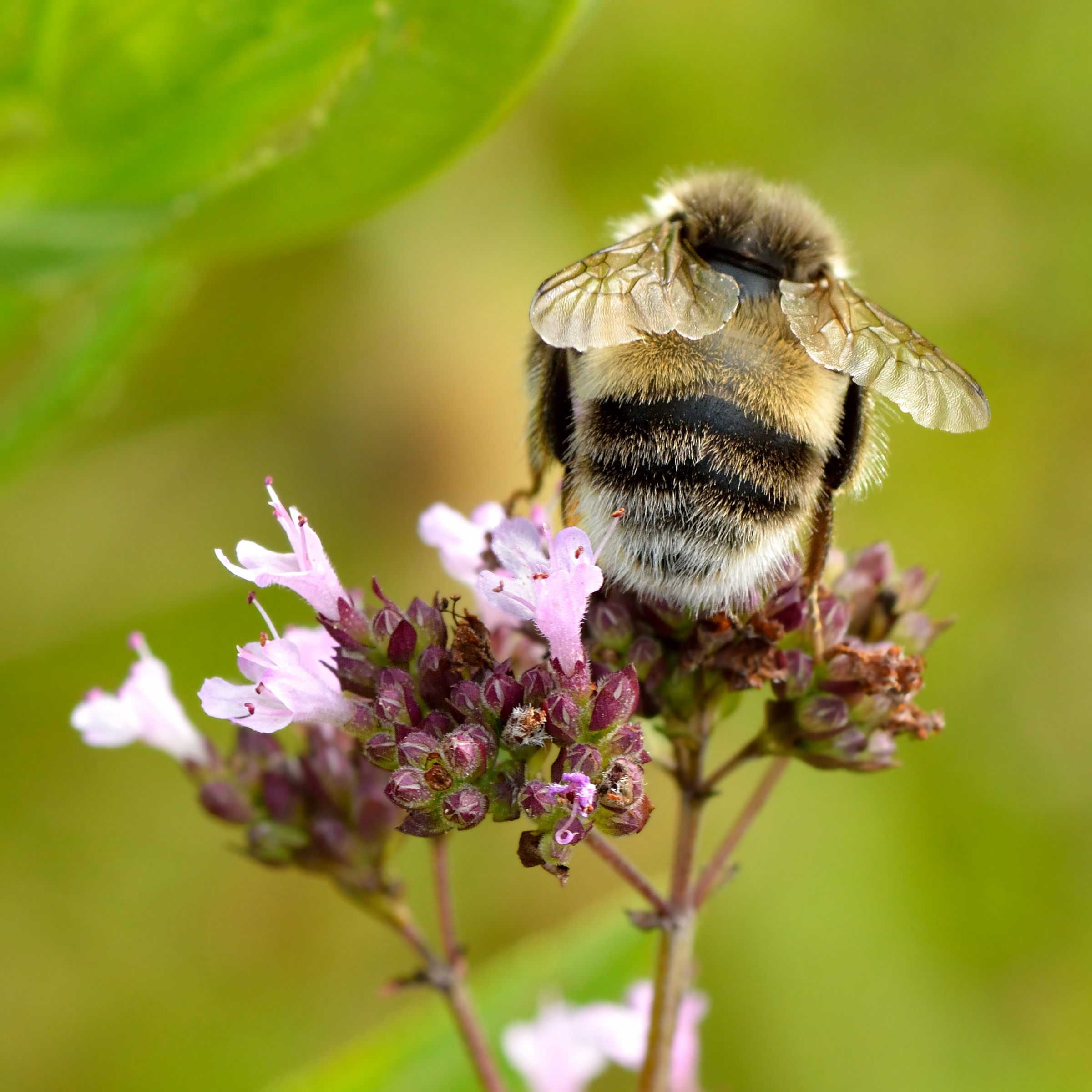
Pollination by white-tailed bumblebee

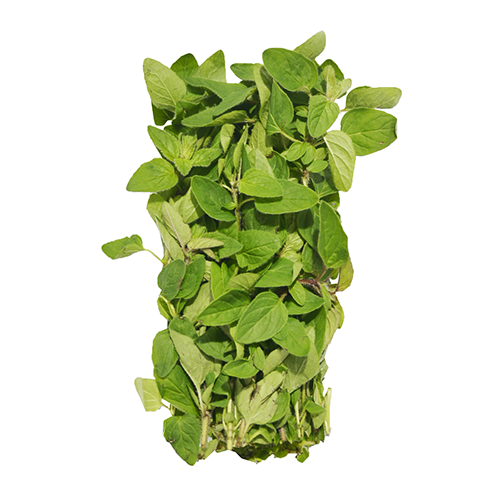
Oregano leaves

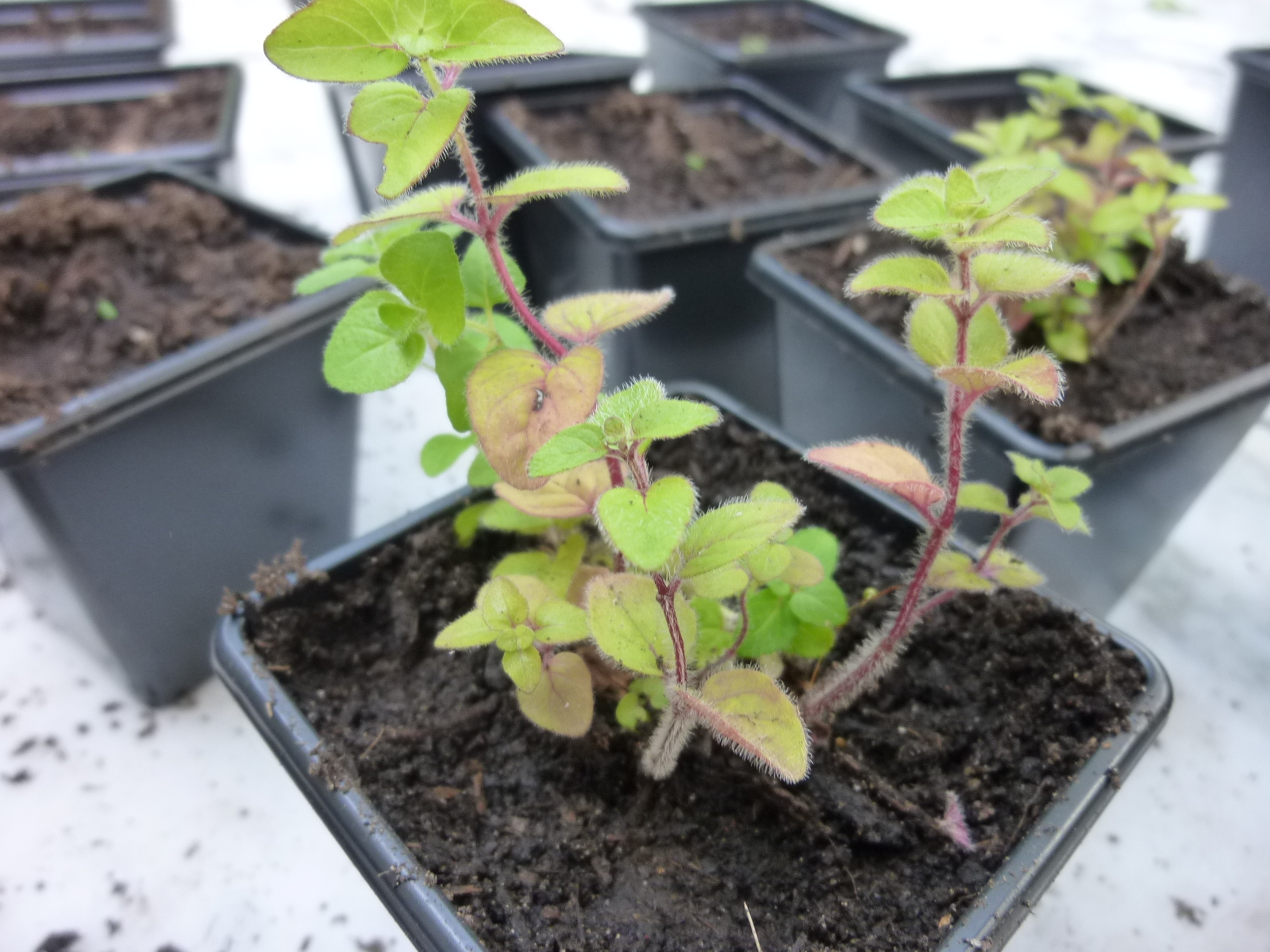
Young plant

Many subspecies and strains of oregano have been developed by humans over centuries for their unique flavours or other characteristics. Tastes range from spicy or astringent to more complicated and sweet. Simple oregano sold in garden stores as O. vulgare may have a bland taste and larger, less-dense leaves, and is not considered the best for culinary use, with a taste less remarkable and pungent. It can pollinate other more sophisticated strains, but the offspring are rarely better in quality.

The related species Origanum onites (Greece, Turkey) and O. syriacum (West Asia) have similar flavours. A closely related plant is marjoram from Turkey, which differs significantly in taste because phenolic compounds are missing from its essential oil. Some varieties show a flavour intermediate between oregano and marjoram.

=== Subspecies ===
Accepted subspecies:

1. O. v. subsp. glandulosum (Desf.) Ietsw. – Tunisia, Algeria
2. O. v. subsp. gracile (K.Koch) Ietsw. (= O. tyttanthum) has glossy green leaves and pink flowers. It grows well in pots or containers, and is more often grown for added ornamental value than other oregano. The flavour is pungent and spicy. – Central Asia, Iran, India, Turkey, Afghanistan, Pakistan.
3. O. v. subsp. hirtum (Link) Ietsw. – (Italian oregano, Greek oregano) is a common source of cultivars with a different aroma from those of O. v. gracile. Growth is vigorous and very hardy, with darker green, slightly hairy foliage. Generally, it is considered the best all-purpose culinary subspecies. – Greece, Balkans, Turkey, Cyprus
4. O. v. subsp. virens (Hoffmanns. & Link) Ietsw. – Iberian Peninsula, Macaronesia, Morocco
5. O. v. subsp. viridulum (Martrin-Donos) Nyman – widespread from Corsica to Nepal
6. O. v. subsp. vulgare – widespread across Europe + Asia from Ireland to China; naturalized in North America + Venezuela

=== Cultivars ===
Example cultivars of oregano include:

- 'Aureum' – golden foliage (greener if grown in shade), mild taste: It has gained the Royal Horticultural Society's Award of Garden Merit
- 'Greek Kaliteri' – O. v. subsp. hirtum strains/landraces, small, hardy, dark, compact, thick, silvery-haired leaves, usually with purple undersides, excellent reputation for flavour and pungency, as well as medicinal uses, strong, archetypal oregano flavour (Greek kaliteri: the best)
- 'Hot & Spicy' – O. v. subsp. hirtum strain
- 'Nana' – dwarf cultivar

Cultivars traded as Italian, Sicilian, etc. are usually hardy sweet marjoram (O. × majoricum), a hybrid between the southern Adriatic O. v. subsp. hirtum and sweet marjoram (O. majorana). They have a reputation for sweet and spicy tones, with little bitterness, and are prized for their flavour and compatibility with various recipes and sauces.

== Cultivation ==
Oregano is planted in early spring, the plants being spaced 30 cm (12 in) apart in fairly dry soil, with full sun. It will grow in a pH range between 6.0 (mildly acidic) and 9.0 (strongly alkaline), with a preferred range between 6.0 and 8.0. It prefers a hot, relatively dry climate, but does well in other environments.

== Uses ==
=== Culinary ===
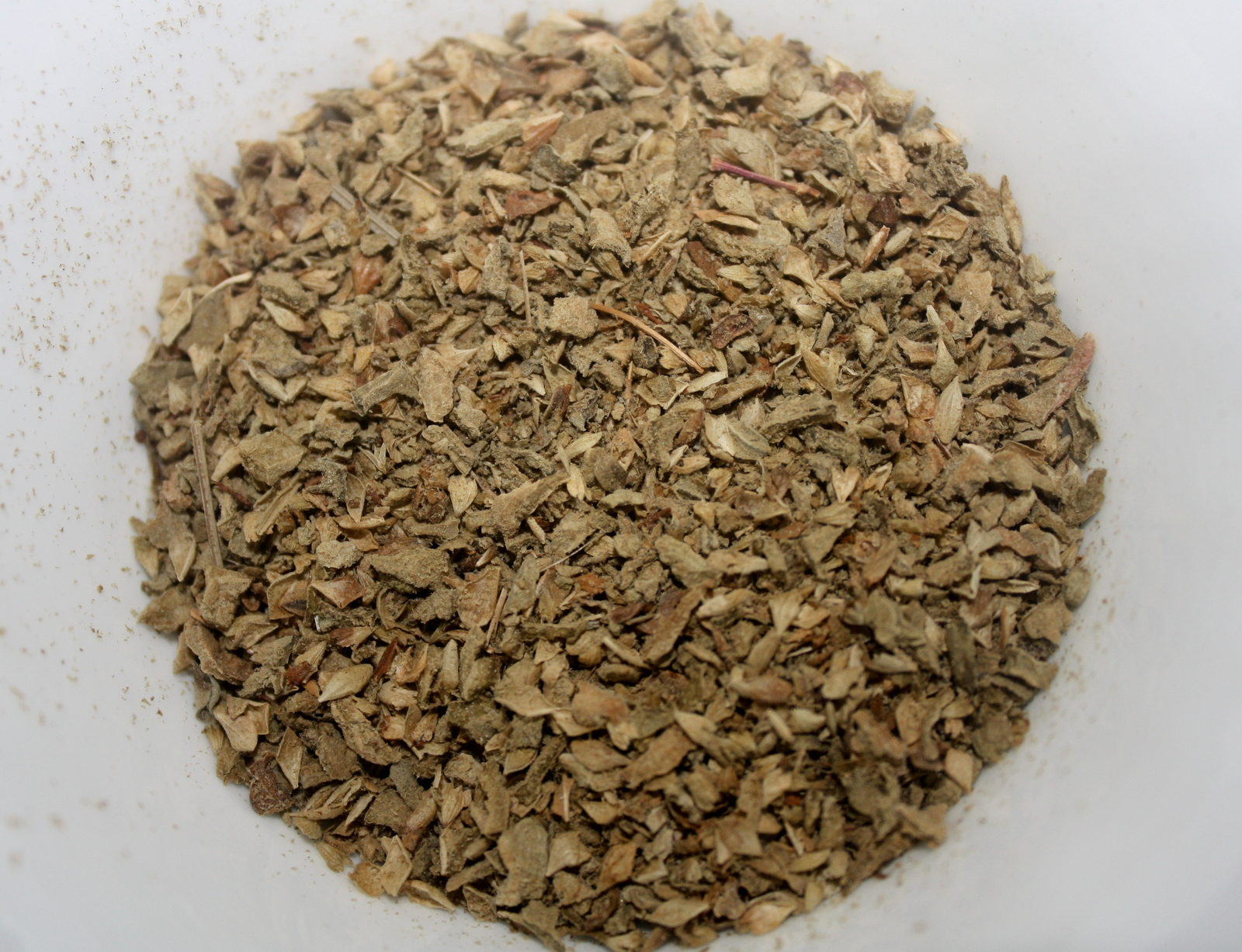
Dried oregano leaves

Oregano is a culinary herb, used for the flavour of its leaves, which can be more intense when dried than fresh. It has an earthy, warm, and slightly bitter taste, which can vary in intensity. Good-quality oregano may be strong enough to almost numb the tongue, but cultivars adapted to colder climates may have a lesser flavour. Factors such as climate, season, and soil composition may affect the aromatic oils present, and this effect may be greater than the differences between the various species of plants. Among the chemical compounds contributing to the flavour are carvacrol, thymol, limonene, pinene, ocimene, and caryophyllene.

Oregano is the staple herb of Italian cuisine, most frequently used with roasted, fried, or grilled vegetables, meat, and fish. Oregano combines well with spicy foods popular in Southern Italy. It is less commonly used in the North, where marjoram is preferred. It became popular in the U.S. after soldiers returning from World War II brought back a taste for the "pizza herb", which had probably been eaten in Southern Italy for centuries.

Oregano is widely used in cuisines of the Mediterranean Basin and Latin America, especially in Mexican cuisine and Argentine cuisine. In Turkish cuisine, oregano is mostly used for flavouring meat, especially mutton and lamb. Throughout the Middle East, it is a popular variation in the spice blend za'atar, and is a key ingredient in Argentine chimichurri.

During the summer, generous amounts of dried oregano are often added as a topping to a tomato and cucumber salad in Portugal, but it can be used to season meat and fish dishes as well. In Spain, apart from seasoning, it is used in preparations of a variety of traditional dishes such as morcilla (Iberian pig blood sausage) and adobo sauce for fish and meat. The dried and ground leaves are most often used in Greece to add flavour to Greek salad, and is usually added to the lemon-olive oil sauce that accompanies fish or meat grills and casseroles. In Albania, dried oregano is often used to make herbal tea which is especially popular in the northern part of Albania.

=== Oregano oil ===
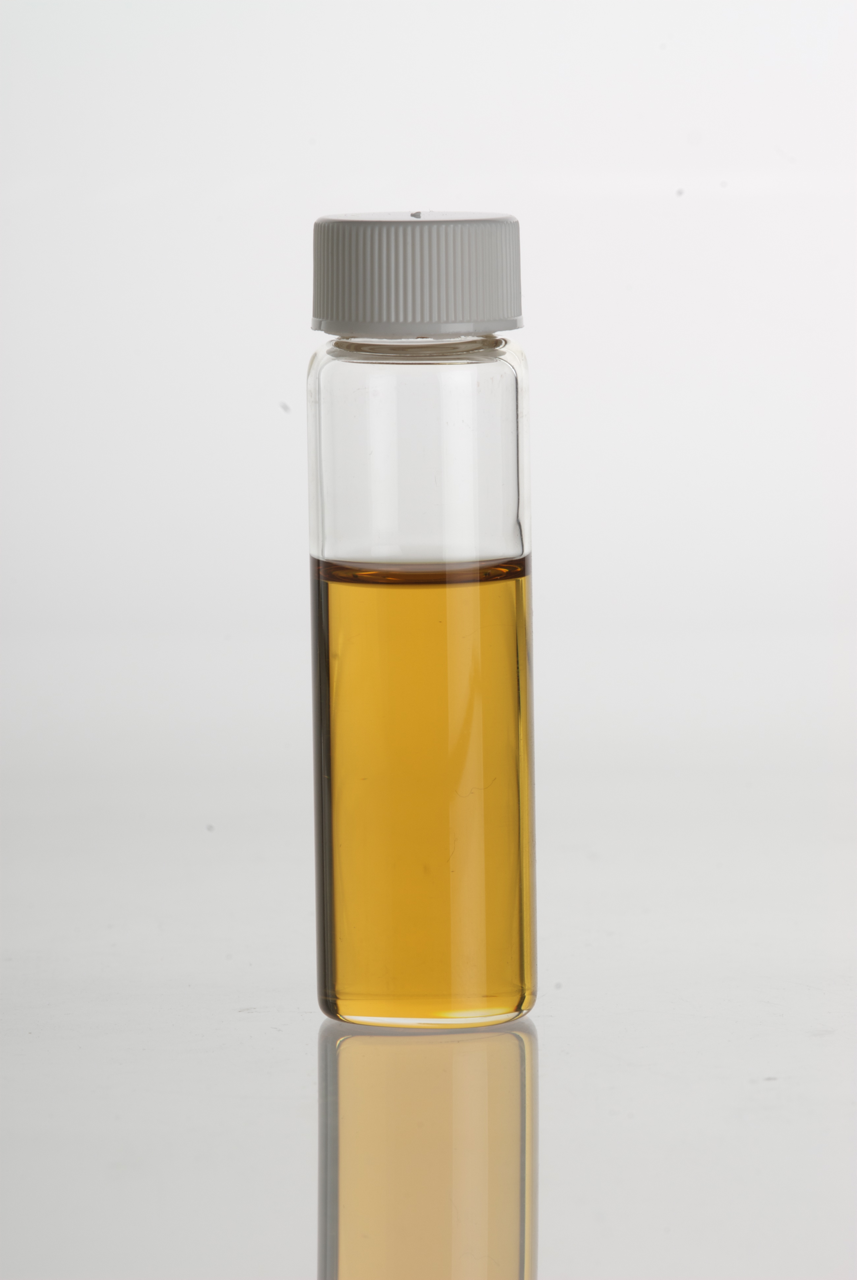
Oregano essential oil in a clear glass vial

Oregano oil has been used in folk medicine over centuries. Oregano essential oil is extracted from the leaves of the oregano plant. Although oregano or its oil may be used as a dietary supplement, there is no clinical evidence to indicate that either the oil or extract is safe or effective for human health.

In 2014, the U.S. Food and Drug Administration (FDA) warned a Utah company, Young Living, that its herbal products, including oregano essential oil, were being promoted to have numerous unproven anti-disease effects, and so were being sold as unauthorized misbranded drugs subject to seizure and federal penalties. Similar FDA warning letters for false advertising and unproven health claims about oregano essential oil products were published in 2017, 2018 and 2021.

=== Cultural ===
In Greek mythology, oregano was created by the goddess Aphrodite as a symbol of happiness and planted in her garden on Mount Olympus. The ancient Greeks used oregano in wedding ceremonies and as funerary offerings.

== Other plants called "oregano" ==
- Coleus amboinicus, known as Cuban oregano, orégano poleo ('pennyroyal oregano'), orégano francés ('French oregano'), Mexican mint, Mexican thyme, and many other names, is also of the mint family (Lamiaceae). It has large and somewhat succulent leaves. Common throughout the tropics, including Latin America, Africa, and Southeast Asia, it is probably of eastern-hemisphere origin.
- Lippia graveolens, Mexican oregano, known in Spanish as orégano cimarrón ('wild oregano'), is not in the mint family, but in the related vervain family (Verbenaceae). The flavour of Mexican oregano has a stronger savory component instead of the piney hint of rosemary-like flavour in true oregano, and its citrus accent might be more aromatic than in oregano. It is becoming more commonly sold outside of Mexico, especially in the southeastern United States. It is sometimes used as a substitute for epazote leaves.
- Hedeoma patens, known in Spanish as orégano chiquito ('small oregano'), is also among the Lamiaceae. It is used as an herb in the Mexican states of Chihuahua and Coahuila.
- Poliomintha longiflora, common names: Mexican oregano and rosemary mint, is native to Mexico and also grown and used in the United States.

== See also ==
- Thymus vulgaris, thyme
