= Hedeoma patens =

Oregano chiquito

Scientific classification
- Kingdom: Plantae
- Clade: Tracheophytes
- Clade: Angiosperms
- Clade: Eudicots
- Clade: Asterids
- Order: Lamiales
- Family: Lamiaceae
- Genus: Hedeoma
- Species: H. patens

Binomial name
- Hedeoma patens M.E.Jones

Species of plant

Hedeoma patens (Spanish common name, orégano chiquito, 'small oregano') is a small herb in the genus Hedeoma, family Lamiaceae. It is native to the Mexican states of Chihuahua and Coahuila. It is not very closely related to true oregano.

== Uses ==
The plant is highly aromatic. It is used by natives of northwestern Mexico to flavor various food items, especially beans.

== See also ==
- Lippia graveolens, Mexican oregano or orégano cimarrón ('wild oregano')
- Coleus amboinicus, known as Cuban oregano, orégano poleo ('pennyroyal oregano'), orégano francés ('French oregano'), Mexican mint, Mexican thyme, and many other names. Common throughout the tropics, including Latin America, but probably of eastern-hemisphere origin.
