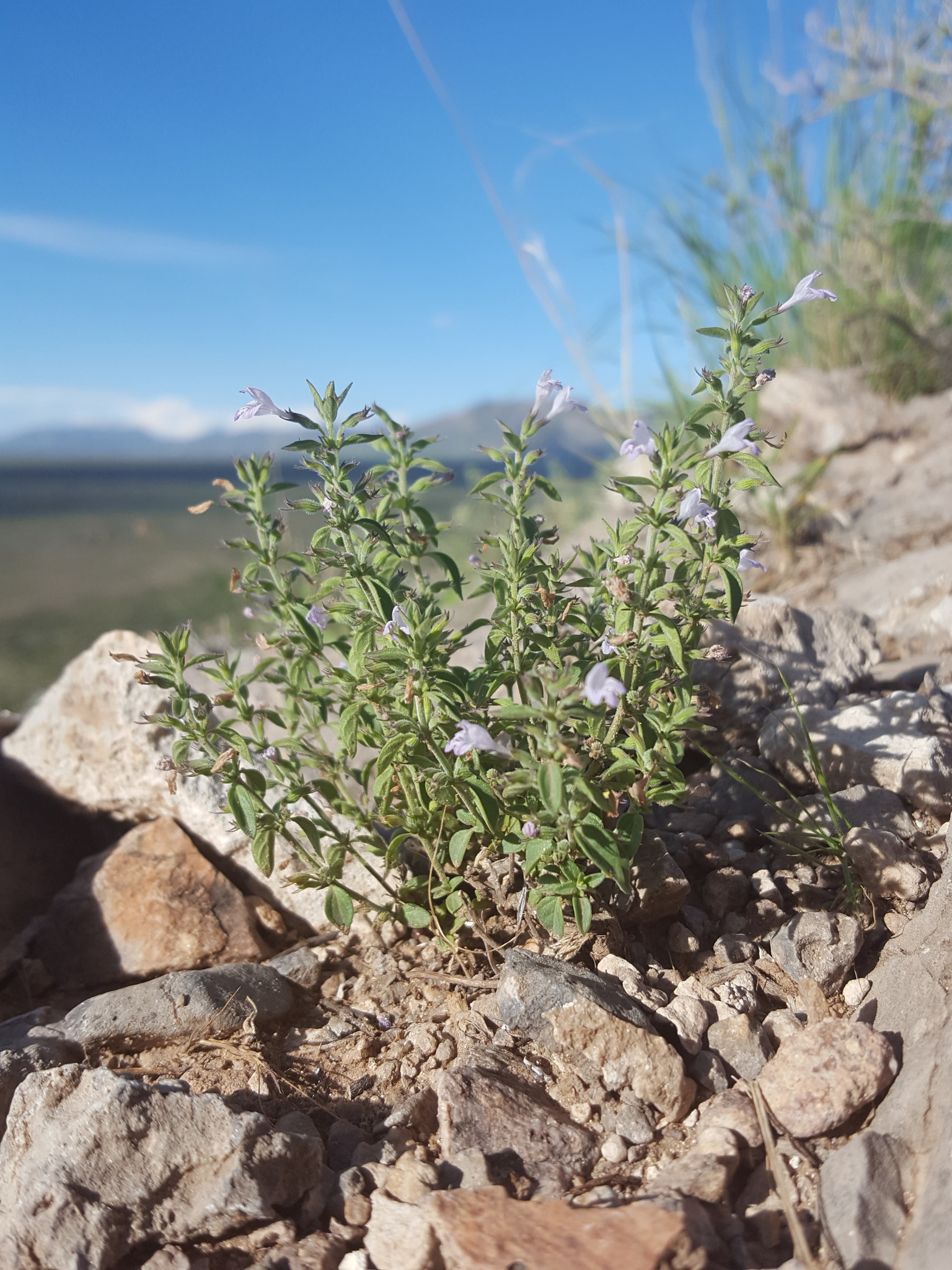

Scientific classification
- Kingdom: Plantae
- Clade: Tracheophytes
- Clade: Angiosperms
- Clade: Eudicots
- Clade: Asterids
- Order: Lamiales
- Family: Lamiaceae
- Genus: Hedeoma
- Species: H. nana

Binomial name
- Hedeoma nana (Torr.) Briq.

= Hedeoma nana =

Species of flowering plant

Hedeoma nana, the dwarf false pennyroyal, is a species of flowering plant in the mint family (Lamiaceae). It is native to parts of the southwestern and central United States and extends into northeastern Mexico. This occasionally aromatic herb occurs in a variety of open and semi-arid habitats and is known for its small, gland-dotted leaves and axillary clusters of flowers with inflated/flared corollas.

== Description ==
Hedeoma nana is a perennial herb (occasionally woody at the base) typically 10–25 cm tall, often branching from the base with wiry stems. The leaves are small, opposite, and finely glandular, sometimes releasing a mild minty fragrance when crushed. The flowers are arranged in small clusters at the leaf axils, with tubular corollas usually in shades of blue-purple or pinkish hues, and bloom from spring through fall in much of its range.

== Distribution and habitat ==
This species is native to the southwestern and south-central United States — including Arizona, California (especially the Mojave and other desert regions), Nevada, New Mexico, Texas, and Utah — and extends into northeastern Mexico. It typically grows in rocky calcareous slopes, desert scrub, pinyon-juniper woodland, and other open, dry habitats at elevations ranging from low valleys to mountainous regions.

== Ecology ==
As a member of the mint family, Hedeoma nana produces nectar-rich flowers that attract a variety of insects. It is adapted to dry conditions and often contributes to the floral diversity of desert and semi-arid plant communities.

== Taxonomy ==
The species was originally described as a variety (Hedeoma dentata var. nana Torr.) and later elevated to species status as Hedeoma nana by Briquet. It has several accepted infraspecific taxa, including subspecies such as Hedeoma nana subsp. californica and Hedeoma nana subsp. mexicana, reflecting regional variation within its broad range. The species is treated as distinct by major taxonomic authorities such as POWO, USDA, and regional floras.
