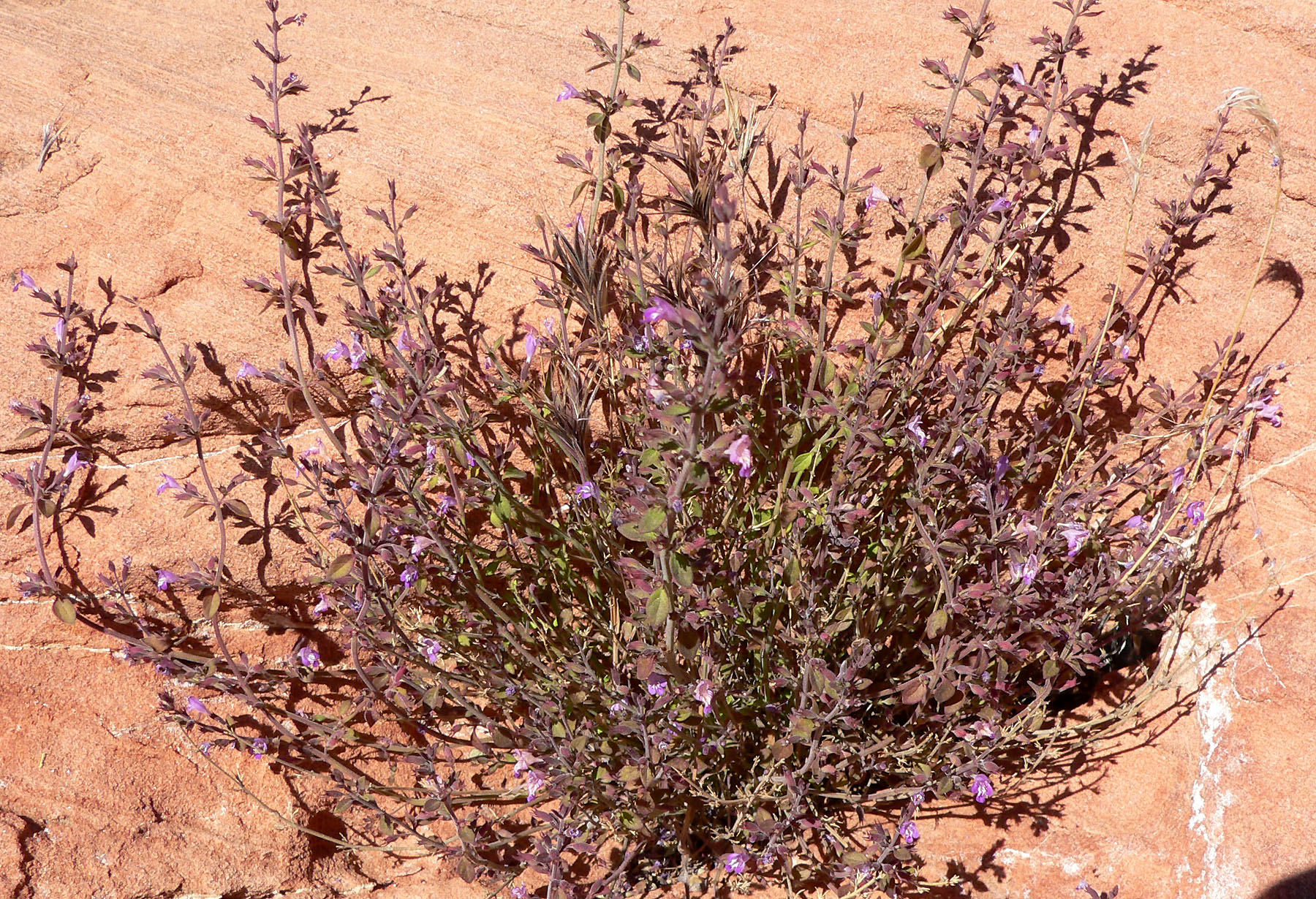
- Hedeoma nana, Mohave Desert

Scientific classification
- Kingdom: Plantae
- Clade: Tracheophytes
- Clade: Angiosperms
- Clade: Eudicots
- Clade: Asterids
- Order: Lamiales
- Family: Lamiaceae
- Subfamily: Nepetoideae
- Tribe: Mentheae
- Genus: Hedeoma; Pers.

Synonyms
- Pseudocunila Brade

= Hedeoma =

False pennyroyals

Genus of flowering plants

Hedeoma is a genus of flowering plants in the mint family, Lamiaceae. It is native to North and South America. They are commonly known as false pennyroyals.

The genus name is derived from the Greek words ἡδύς (hedys), meaning "sweet," and ὀσμή (osme), meaning "odour". It refers to the scent of the leaves. Hedeoma patens M.E. Jones (common name, oregano chiquito) is used by natives of northwestern Mexico to flavor various food items.

Species

1. Hedeoma acinoides Scheele – Slender false pennyroyal - Texas, Oklahoma, Coahuila
2. Hedeoma apiculata W.S.Stewart – McKittrick's false pennyroyal - western Texas, southeastern New Mexico
3. Hedeoma bella (Epling) R.S.Irving - Jalisco
4. Hedeoma chihuahuensis (Henrard) B.L.Turner - Chihuahua
5. Hedeoma ciliolata (Epling & W.S.Stewart) R.S.Irving - Gypsum false pennyroyal - Nuevo León
6. Hedeoma costata Hemsl. – Ribbed false pennyroyal - Mexico, Guatemala, Texas, Arizona, New Mexico
7. Hedeoma crenata R.S.Irving - Rio de Janeiro
8. Hedeoma dentata Torr. – Dentate false pennyroyal - Arizona, Sonora, New Mexico
9. Hedeoma diffusa Greene – Spreading (or Flagstaff) false pennyroyal - Nevada, Arizona
10. Hedeoma drummondii Benth. – Drummond's false pennyroyal - western United States, Alabama, Mississippi, Nuevo León, Coahuila, Chihuahua, Sonora
11. Hedeoma floribunda Standl. - Chihuahua
12. Hedeoma hispida Pursh – Rough false pennyroyal - Canada, central + eastern United States (especially the Great Plains)
13. Hedeoma hyssopifolia A.Gray – Aromatic false pennyroyal - northern Mexico, New Mexico, Arizona
14. Hedeoma johnstonii R.S.Irving - Coahuila
15. Hedeoma jucunda Greene - Durango
16. Hedeoma mandoniana Wedd. - Peru, Bolivia, Jujuy Province of Argentina
17. Hedeoma martirensis Moran - Baja California
18. Hedeoma matomianum Moran - Baja California
19. Hedeoma medium Epling - Argentina, Uruguay
20. Hedeoma microphylla R.S.Irving - San Luis Potosí
21. Hedeoma mollis Torr. – Softhair false pennyroyal - western Texas
22. Hedeoma montana Brandegee - Coahuila
23. Hedeoma multiflora Benth - Argentina, Uruguay, southern Brazil
24. Hedeoma nana (Torr.) Briq. – Dwarf false pennyroyal - Chihuahua, Texas, New Mexico, Arizona, Utah, Nevada, Mohave Desert in California
25. Hedeoma oblatifolia Villarreal - Coahuila
26. Hedeoma oblongifolia (A.Gray) A.Heller – Oblongleaf false pennyroyal - Chihuahua, Sonora, New Mexico, Arizona
27. Hedeoma palmeri Hemsl. - San Luis Potosí, Nuevo León, Coahuila
28. Hedeoma patens M.E. Jones –oregano chiquito - Chihuahua, Coahuila
29. Hedeoma patrina W.S.Stewart - Zacatecas
30. †Hedeoma pilosa R.S.Irving – Old blue false pennyroyal - Brewster County in Texas but apparently extinct
31. Hedeoma piperita Benth. - Hidalgo, México State
32. Hedeoma plicata Torr. – Veiny false pennyroyal - Texas, Arizona, New Mexico, northern Mexico
33. Hedeoma polygalifolia Benth. - southern Brazil
34. Hedeoma pulcherrima Wooton & Standl. – White Mountain false pennyroyal - New Mexico
35. Hedeoma pulegioides (L.) Pers. – American false pennyroyal - eastern Canada, central + eastern United States
36. Hedeoma pusilla (R.S.Irving) R.S.Irving - Nuevo León
37. Hedeoma quercetora Epling - Nuevo León
38. Hedeoma reverchonii (A.Gray) A.Gray – Reverchon's false pennyroyal - southern Great Plains (Texas, Oklahoma, western Arkansas)
39. Hedeoma rzedowskii B.L.Turner - Aguascalientes, San Luis Potosí
40. Hedeoma × serpyllifolia Small - Texas, New Mexico
41. Hedeoma tenuiflora Brandegee - Baja California
42. Hedeoma tenuipes Epling - northeastern Mexico
43. Hedeoma todsenii R.S.Irving – Todsen's false pennyroyal - New Mexico

== Formerly placed here ==
- Clinopodium glabrum (Nutt.) Kuntze (as H. arkansana Nutt.)
- Poliomintha incana (Torr.) A.Gray (as H. incana Torr.)
