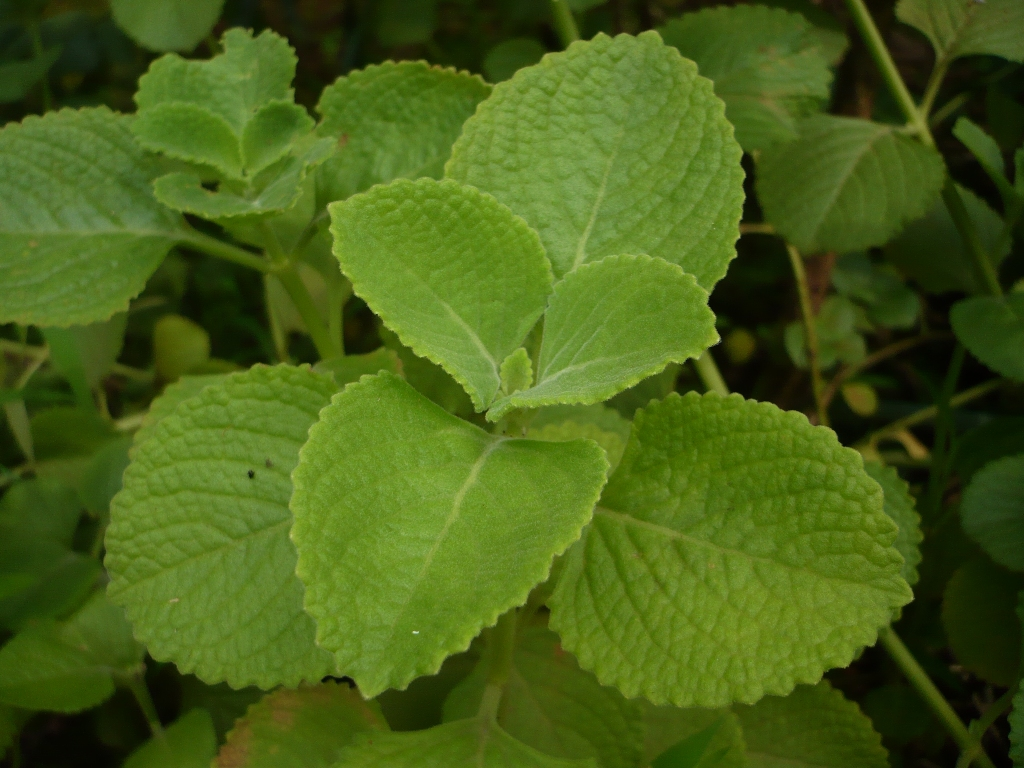

Scientific classification
- Kingdom: Plantae
- Clade: Tracheophytes
- Clade: Angiosperms
- Clade: Eudicots
- Clade: Asterids
- Order: Lamiales
- Family: Lamiaceae
- Genus: Coleus
- Species: C. amboinicus

Binomial name
- Coleus amboinicus Lour.

Synonyms
- Majana amboinica (Lour.) Kuntze; Plectranthus amboinicus (Lour.) Spreng.; Coleus amboinicus var. violaceus Gürke; Coleus aromaticus Benth.; Coleus carnosus Hassk.; Coleus crassifolius Benth.; Coleus subfrutectosus Summerh.; Coleus suborbicularis Zoll. & Moritzi; Coleus suganda Blanco; Coleus vaalae (Forssk.) Deflers; Majana carnosa (Hassk.) Kuntze; Majana suganda (Blanco) Kuntze; Ocimum vaalae Forssk.

= Coleus amboinicus =

Species of plant

Coleus amboinicus is a species of semi-succulent perennial plant in the family Lamiaceae. It has a pungent oregano-like flavor and odor. Coleus amboinicus is considered to be native to parts of Africa, the Arabian Peninsula, and India, although it is widely cultivated and naturalized elsewhere in the tropics where it is used as a spice and ornamental plant. Common names in English include Indian borage, country borage, French thyme, Indian mint, Mexican mint, Cuban oregano, broad leaf thyme, soup mint, Spanish thyme.

The species epithet, amboinicus refers to Ambon Island, in Indonesia. In 1747, 45 years after his death, a volume written by Georg Eberhard Rumphius was published, including the plants he called Marrubium album Amboinicum, with the local name Daun hati hati. He had encountered them in Ambon and the Banda Islands, both cultivated in gardens and growing wild. In 1790, the Linnaean name Coleus amboinicus was published by João de Loureiro (1717–1791) who had encountered the plants in Cochinchina and parts of India.

== Description ==
A member of the mint family Lamiaceae, Coleus amboinicus grows up to 1 m (3.3 ft) tall. The stem is fleshy, about 30–90 cm (12–35 in), either with long rigid hairs (hispidly villous) or densely covered with soft, short and erect hairs (tomentose). Old stems are smooth (glabrescent).

Leaves are 5–7 cm (2.0–2.8 in) by 4–6 cm (1.6–2.4 in), fleshy, undivided (simple), broad, egg/oval-shaped with a tapering tip (ovate). The margins are coarsely crenate to dentate-crenate except at the base. They are thickly studded with hairs (pubescent), with the lower surface possessing the most numerous glandular hairs, giving a frosted appearance. The petiole is 2–4.5 cm (0.79–1.77 in). The aroma of the leaves can be described as a pungent combination of the aromas of oregano, thyme, and turpentine. The taste of the leaves is described as being similar to the one of oregano, but with a sharp mint-like flavor.

Flowers are on a short stem (shortly pedicelled), pale purplish, in dense 10-20 (or more) flowered dense whorls (cymes), at distant intervals, in a long slender spike-like raceme. Rachis 10–20 cm (3.9–7.9 in), fleshy and pubescent. The bracts are broadly ovate, 3–4 cm (1.2–1.6 in) long, acute. The calyx is campanulate, 2–4 mm (0.079–0.157 in) long, hirsute and glandular, subequally 5-toothed, upper tooth broadly ovate-oblong, obtuse, abruptly acute, lateral and lower teeth acute. Corolla blue, curved and declinate, 8–12 mm (0.31–0.47 in) long, tube 3–4 mm (0.12–0.16 in) long. Trumpet-like widened; limb 2-lipped, upper lip short, erect, puberulent, lower lip long, concave. Filaments are fused below into a tube around the style.

The seeds (nutlets) are smooth, pale-brown, roundish flattened, c. 0.7 by 0.5 mm (0.028 by 0.020 in).

== Distribution and habitat ==
Coleus amboinicus is native to Southern and Eastern Africa, (from South Africa (KwaZulu-Natal) and Eswatini to Angola and Mozambique and north to Kenya and Tanzania) the Arabian Peninsula and India, where it grows in woodland or coastal bush, on rocky slopes and loamy or sandy flats at low elevations. The plant was later brought to Europe, and then from Spain to the Americas, hence the name Spanish thyme.

== Research ==
In basic research, the effects of the essential oil were tested with other plant essential oils for possible use as a mosquito repellant.

== Uses ==
The leaves are strongly flavored. The herb is used as a substitute for oregano to mask the strong odors and flavors of fish, mutton, and goat. It may be batter-fried to make pakodas or rasam. In the Caribbean, leaves are commonly used when seasoning meats for its pungent aroma.

Fresh leaves are used to scent laundry and hair. It is also grown as an ornamental plant.

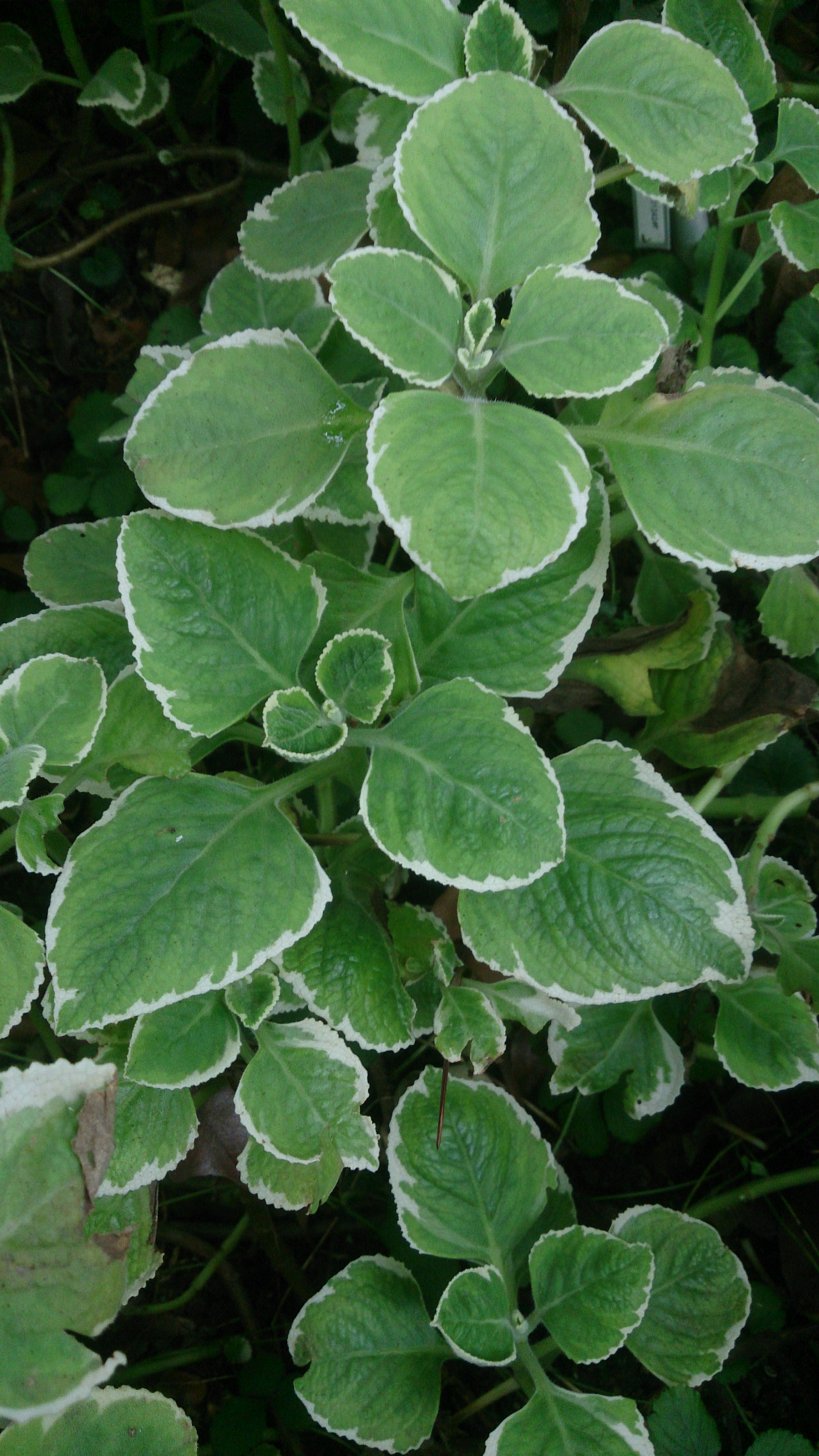
Variegated Cuban oregano (Coleus amboinicus 'Variegatus')

== Phytochemicals ==
The main chemical compounds found in the essential oil of Coleus amboinicus are carvacrol (28.65%), thymol (21.66%), α-humulene (9.67%), undecanal (8.29%), γ-terpinene (7.76%), p-cymene (6.46%), caryophyllene oxide (5.85%), α-terpineol (3.28%), and β-selinene (2.01%). Another analysis obtained thymol (41.3%), carvacrol (13.25%), 1,8-cineole (5.45%), eugenol (4.40%), caryophyllene (4.20%), terpinolene (3.75%), α-pinene (3.20%), β-pinene (2.50%), methyl eugenol (2.10%), and β-phellandrene (1.90%). The variations can be attributed to the methodology used in the extraction process, seasonal variations, soil type, climate, genetic and geographical variations of the plant.

== Cultivation ==
Coleus amboinicus is a fast-growing plant commonly grown in gardens and indoors in pots. Propagation is by stem cuttings, but it can also be grown from seeds. In dry climates the herb grows easily in a well-drained, semi-shaded position. It is frost tender (USDA hardiness zones 10–11) and grows well in subtropical and tropical locations, but will do well in cooler climates if grown in a pot and brought indoors, or moved to a warm, sheltered position in winter. In Hawaii and other humid tropical locations, the plant requires full sun. It can be harvested throughout the growing season to be used fresh, dried, or frozen.

== Common names ==
- Cuban oregano
- Country borage
- French thyme
- Indian borage
- Mexican mint (US, preferred common name)
- Oregano brujo (witch oregano) in Puerto Rico
- Soup mint
- Spanish thyme
- Thick leaf thyme or broad leaf thyme

== Gallery ==
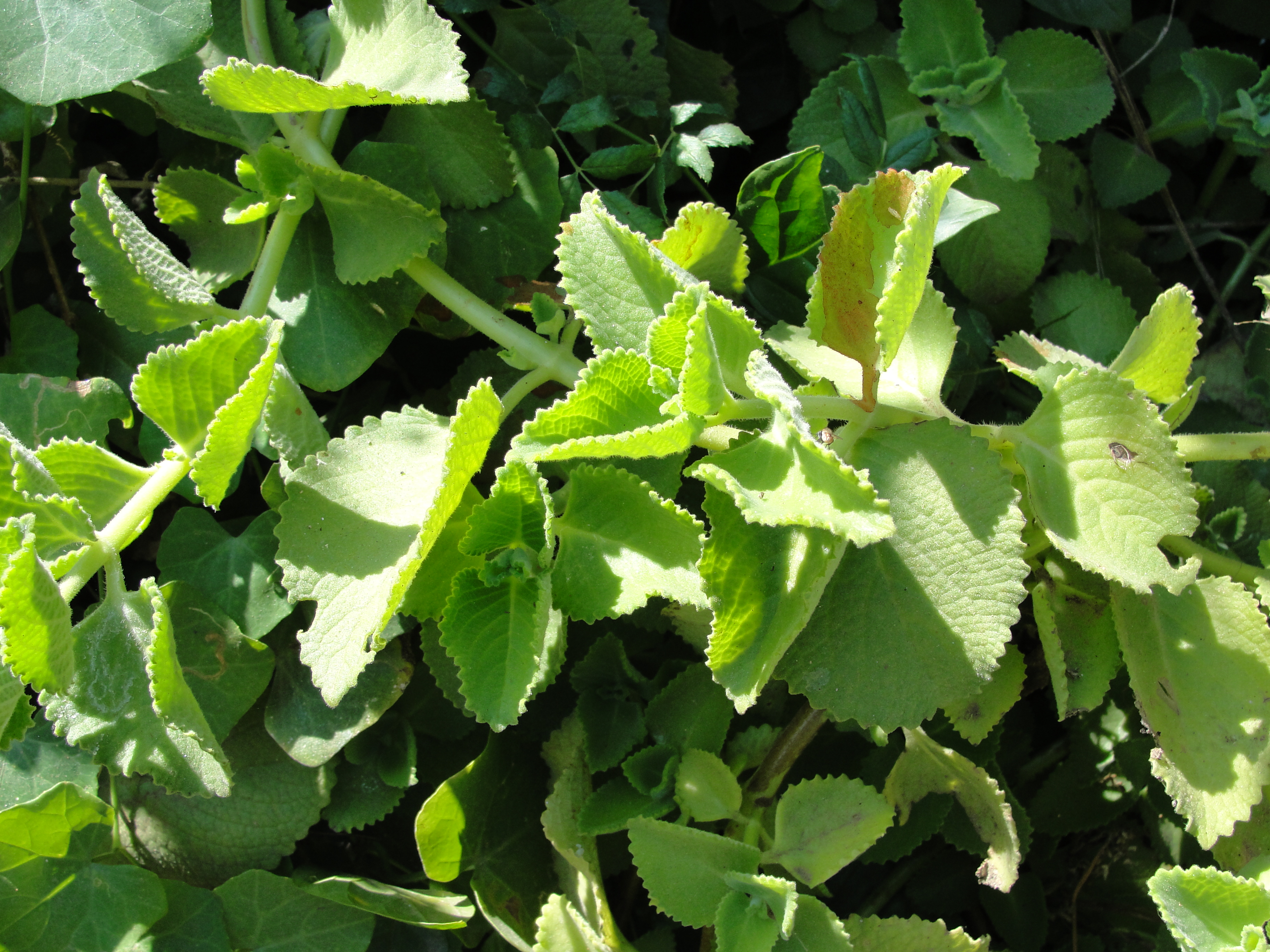
Indian borage

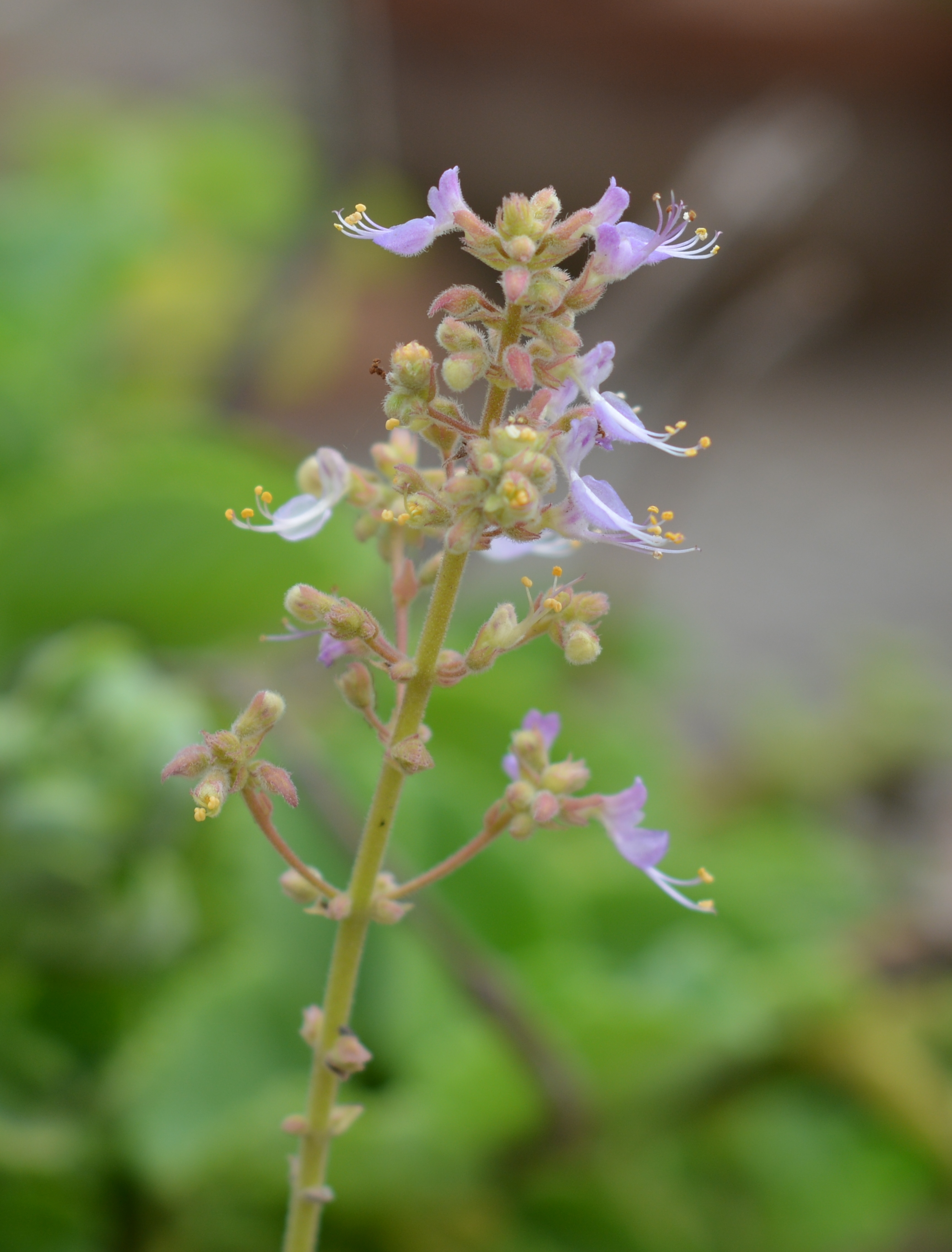
Flowers

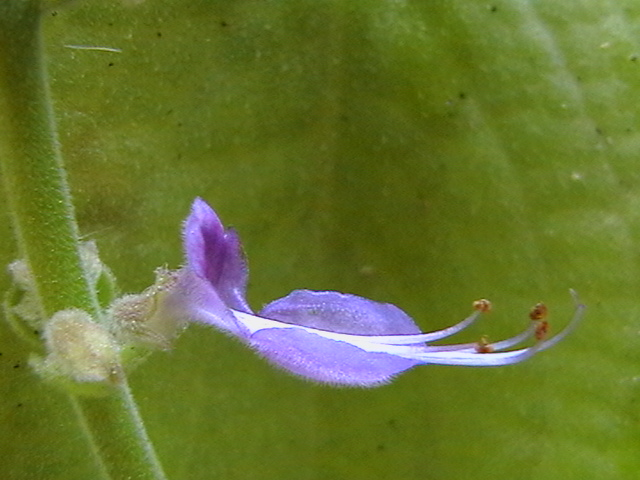
Flower

Flowers

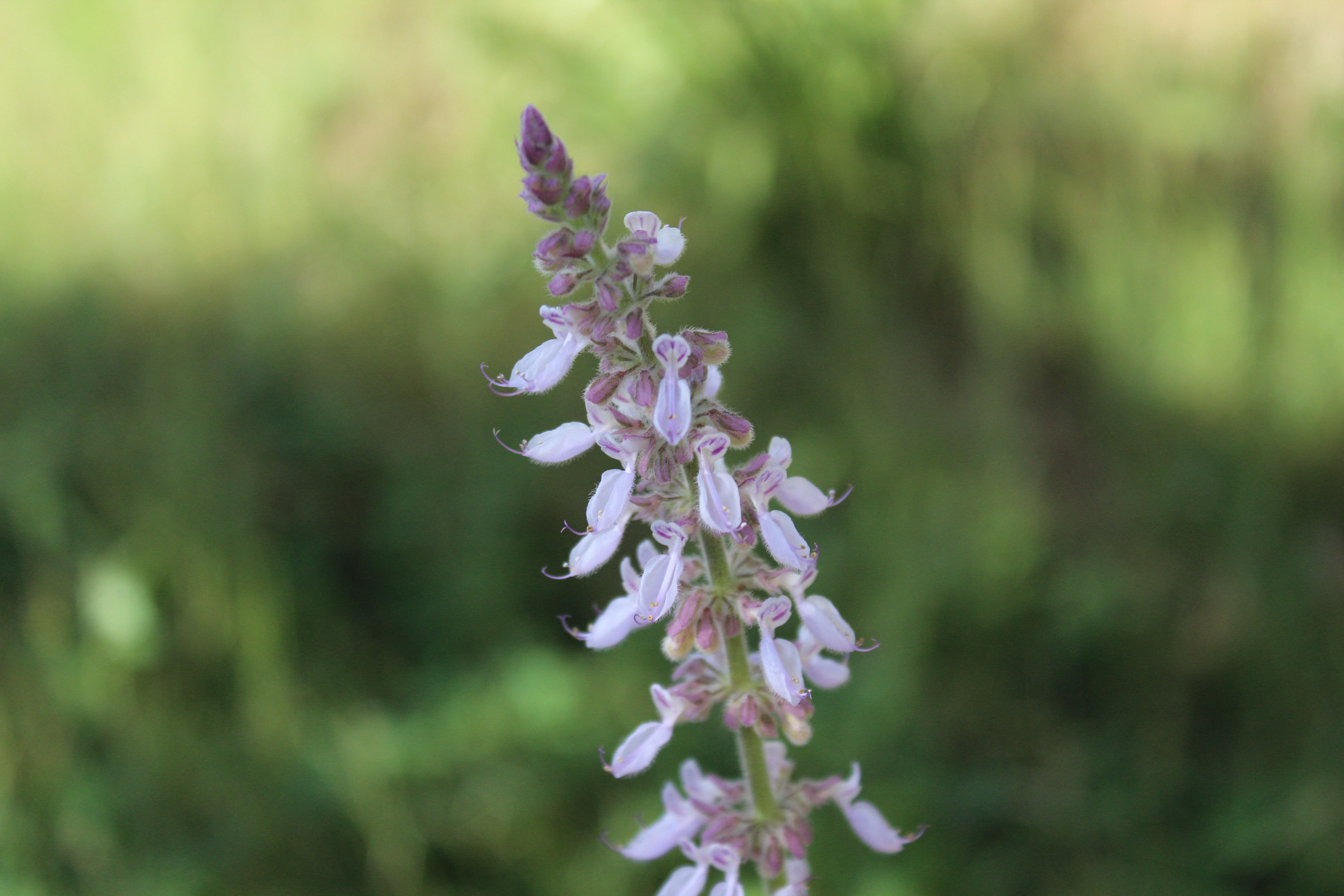
Flowers

== See also ==
- Hedeoma patens, Spanish common name orégano chiquito ('small oregano')
- Lippia graveolens, Mexican oregano or orégano cimarrón ('wild oregano')
