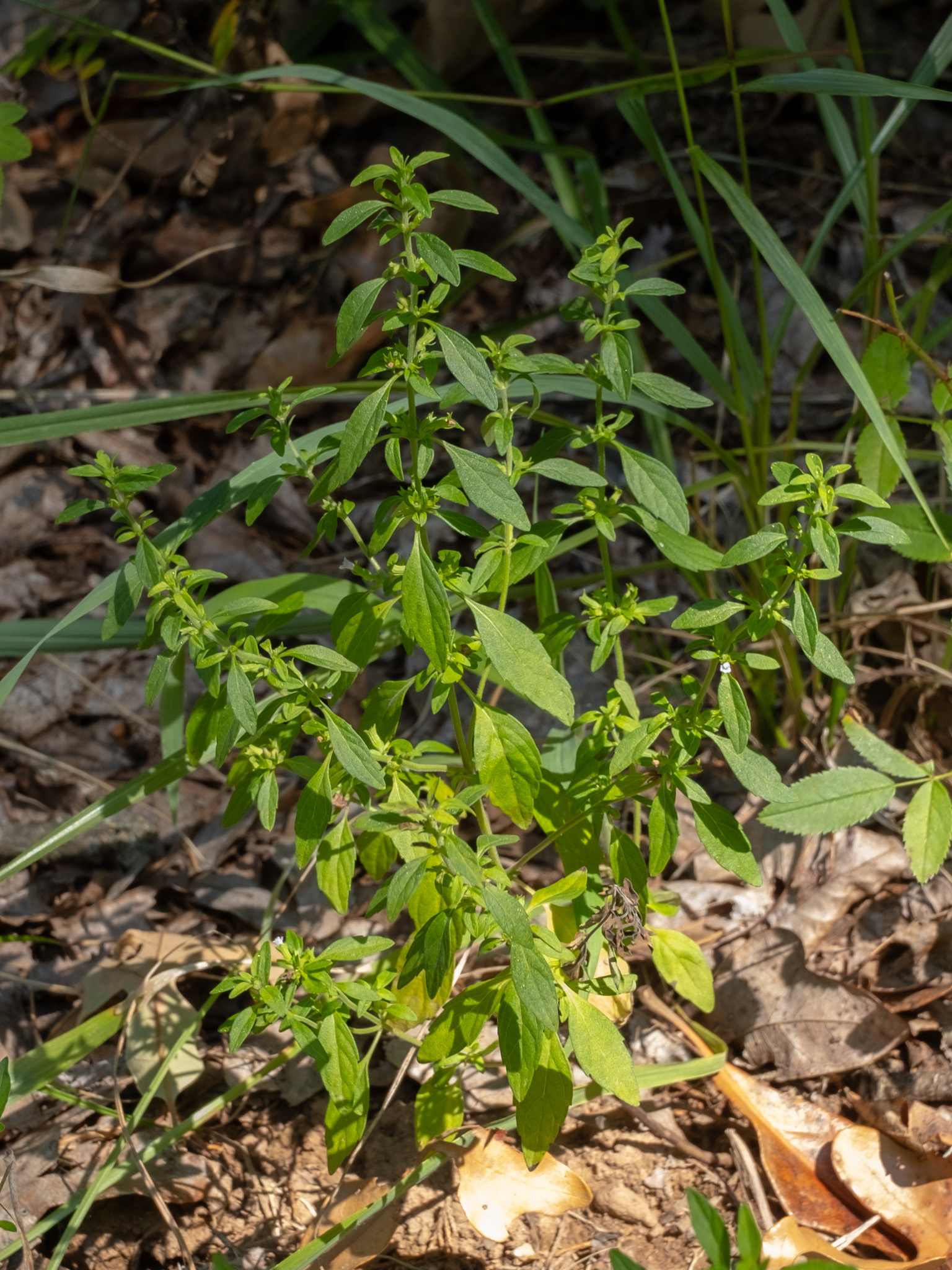

Conservation status
- Secure (NatureServe)

Scientific classification
- Kingdom: Plantae
- Clade: Tracheophytes
- Clade: Angiosperms
- Clade: Eudicots
- Clade: Asterids
- Order: Lamiales
- Family: Lamiaceae
- Genus: Hedeoma
- Species: H. pulegioides

Binomial name
- Hedeoma pulegioides (L.) Pers.
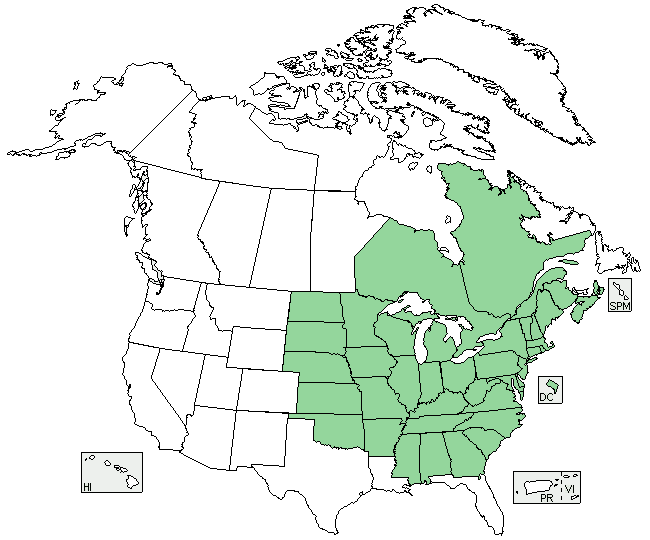
- Distribution map

Synonyms
- Cunila pulegioides L.; Melissa pulegioides (L.) L.; Ziziphora pulegioides (L.) Desf.

= Hedeoma pulegioides =

American pennyroyal

Species of flowering plant

Hedeoma pulegioides, also known as pennyrile, American pennyroyal, or American false pennyroyal, is a species of Hedeoma native to eastern North America, from Nova Scotia and southern Ontario west to Minnesota and South Dakota, and south to northern Georgia and Arkansas.

It is a low-growing, strongly aromatic herbaceous annual plant from 15 to 30 cm tall, with a slender erect much-branched, somewhat hairy and square stem. The leaves are small, thin, and rather narrow, with a strong mintlike odor and pungent taste. The flowers are pale blue, monoecious, produced in small clusters; it flowers from mid to late summer.

Other names are mock pennyroyal, tickweed, stinking balm, mosquito plant, and American false pennyroyal.

The term "pennyroyal" (or pennyrile, from a dialectal pronunciation) is also used to describe a geographic province of western Kentucky, the Pennyroyal Plateau, where H. pulegioides grew in profusion sufficient to lend its name to the whole area.

== Etymology ==
The name pulegioides is derived from the Latin pulegium, and means "like pennyroyal", in reference to European pennyroyal (Mentha pulegium). The name pulegium was given to European pennyroyal by Pliny the Elder in the first century CE, for its use in repelling fleas (pulex, plural pulices) when it was spread on floors.

== Uses ==
In the early 20th century, it was used "in domestic medicine, in the form of a warm infusion, to promote perspiration and as an emmenagogue." Upon ingestion, one of its components, pulegone, metabolizes into hepatotoxic metabolites that depending on dosage can lead to organ failure, seizures, and death.

In the 19th century it was recommended for flea control: "Sprigs of wild myrtle, or penny-royal, or small flat camphor-bags dispersed about your under-clothes, and conveniently fastened, will keep fleas from molesting your person during the day. At night, let penny-royal be scattered over the bed-covers, and laid under the pillows and bolster; strewing a large quantity between the sacking and the matrass. Wash yourself before going to bed in water that has had essence of pennyroyal mixed with it."

In contemporary usage, it is frequently recommended as low growing ground cover with insect repellent properties, especially against ticks, fleas, and mosquitoes.

== Images ==
Frontal view of a flower

Calyx and corolla side view

Leaf

Inflorescence

Habit

Habitat

== See also ==
- Mentha pulegium
