= Oregano (web browser) =

Commercial web browser

- Developer: Oregan Networks
- Release: 20 May 2000
- Final release: 2.2.18rev3 / August 2005
- Operating system: RISC OS
- Type: Web Browser
- License: Proprietary commercial software
- Website: www.genesys.org.uk/oregano2.html

Oregano is a commercial web browser for RISC OS computers. Oregano is a derivative of a browser developed by Oregan Networks Ltd under the name Oregan Media Browser for consumer electronics devices, games consoles and IP (Internet Protocol) Set Top Boxes.

Its first version appeared in 2000 and was originally published by Castle Technology Ltd. Oregano 2 was launched in March 2003, was included in the software distribution of Castle's Iyonix PC and made available for other RISC OS systems. Later in the development of Oregano 2 control of the publishing and distribution was transferred from Castle to GeneSys Developments Ltd, previously known as Oregano UK Ltd.

Oregan's technology architecture features an abstraction layer, which enables its software to be ported across various hardware and Operating System platforms. An abstraction layer implementation has been created for the RISC OS environment, which enables the Oregan software to run on RISC OS based desktop machines.

Oregano 2, the last released version, supports HTML 4.01 (partially), CSS-1, DOM-0, JavaScript 1.5 and Flash 4.0 content.

GeneSys Developments Ltd did secure licensing rights for the latest version of Oregan's browser technology, and a RISC OS version called Oregano 3 was planned, offering complete HTML 4.01 support, XHTML 1.0, CSS-2, DOM-2, JavaScript 1.5, and Flash 6.0 compatibility. However, in April 2007 GeneSys cancelled the project.
