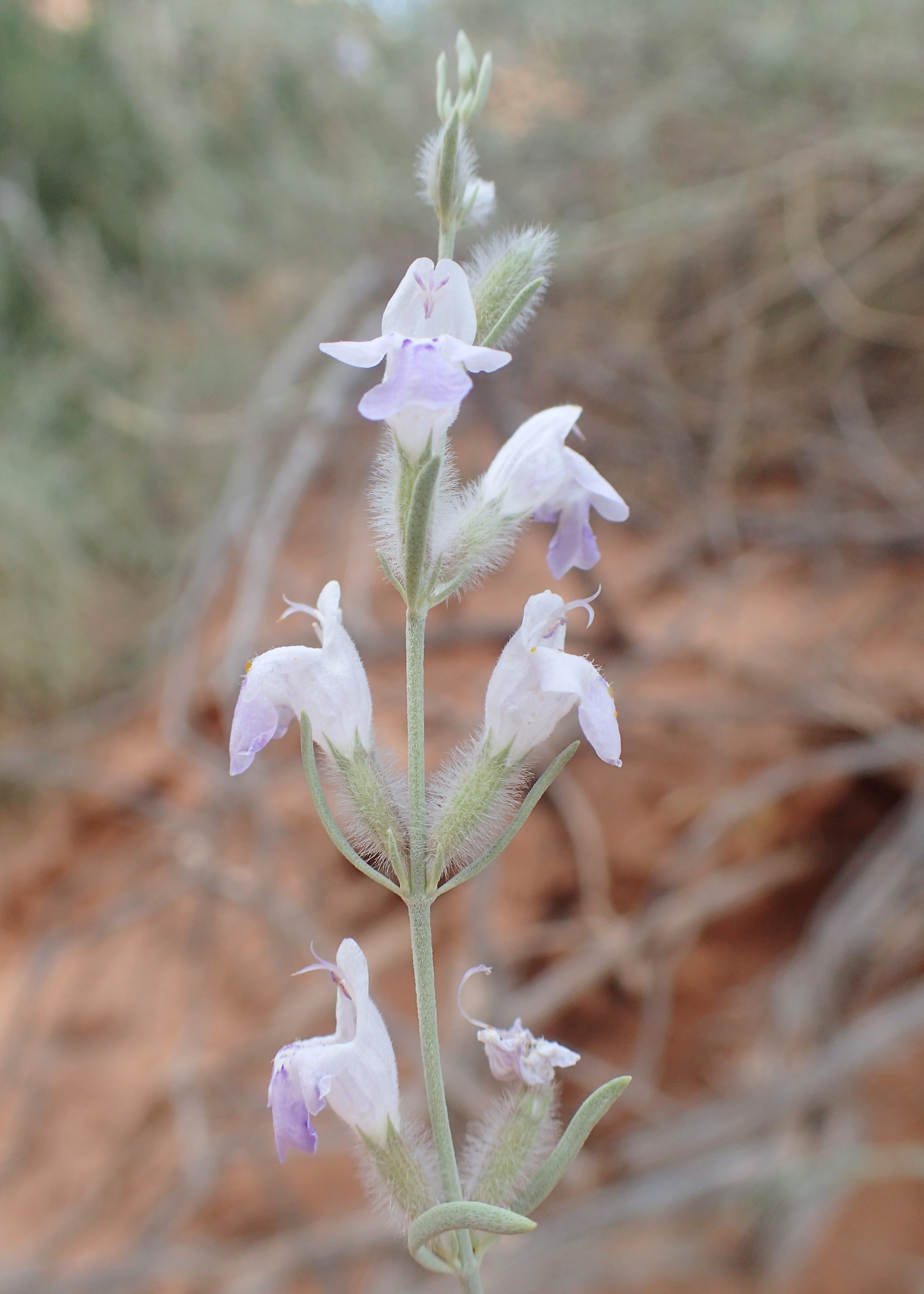

Conservation status
- Apparently Secure (NatureServe)

Scientific classification
- Kingdom: Plantae
- Clade: Embryophytes
- Clade: Tracheophytes
- Clade: Spermatophytes
- Clade: Angiosperms
- Clade: Eudicots
- Clade: Asterids
- Order: Lamiales
- Family: Lamiaceae
- Genus: Poliomintha
- Species: P. incana

Binomial name
- Poliomintha incana (Torr.) A.Gray

Synonyms
- Hedeoma incana Torr.

= Poliomintha incana =

Plant species in the mint family

Poliomintha incana is a species of flowering plant in the mint family which is known as frosted mint. It is native to dry and desert areas of the southwestern United States and northern Mexico. It is a strongly aromatic shrub with dark green foliage covered in small white hairs. Scattered about the foliage are fuzzy, tubular flowers in shades of light purple and blue with tiny purple spots. Frosted mint is eaten fresh or dried or used as a flavoring by Native American groups, particularly the Tewa and Hopi.
