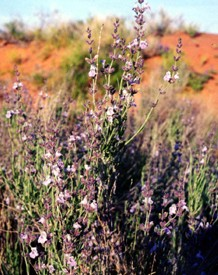
- Poliomintha incana

Scientific classification
- Kingdom: Plantae
- Clade: Tracheophytes
- Clade: Angiosperms
- Clade: Eudicots
- Clade: Asterids
- Order: Lamiales
- Family: Lamiaceae
- Subfamily: Nepetoideae
- Tribe: Mentheae
- Genus: Poliomintha; A.Gray

= Poliomintha =

Genus of flowering plants

Poliomintha is a genus of flowering plants in the mint family, Lamiaceae. It is native to the southwestern United States, Haiti, and northern Mexico.

The name is derived from the Greek words πολιός (polios), meaning "grey," and μίνθη (minthe), meaning "mint." Members of the genus are commonly known as rosemary-mints.

Species

1. Poliomintha bustamanta B.L.Turner - Nuevo León; also called Mexican oregano
2. Poliomintha conjunctrix Epling & Wiggins - Baja California
3. Poliomintha dendritica B.L.Turner - Coahuila
4. Poliomintha glabrescens A.Gray – Leafy rosemary-mint - Big Bend region of western Texas, Coahuila
5. Poliomintha incana (Torr.) A.Gray – Frosted mint, hoary rosemary-mint - Chihuahua, western Texas, New Mexico, Arizona, Utah, southwestern Colorado, San Bernardino County in California
6. Poliomintha longiflora A.Gray - Nuevo León, Coahuila, Haiti; also called Mexican oregano
7. Poliomintha maderensis Henrard - Coahuila
8. Poliomintha marifolia (S.Schauer) A.Gray - Hidalgo
