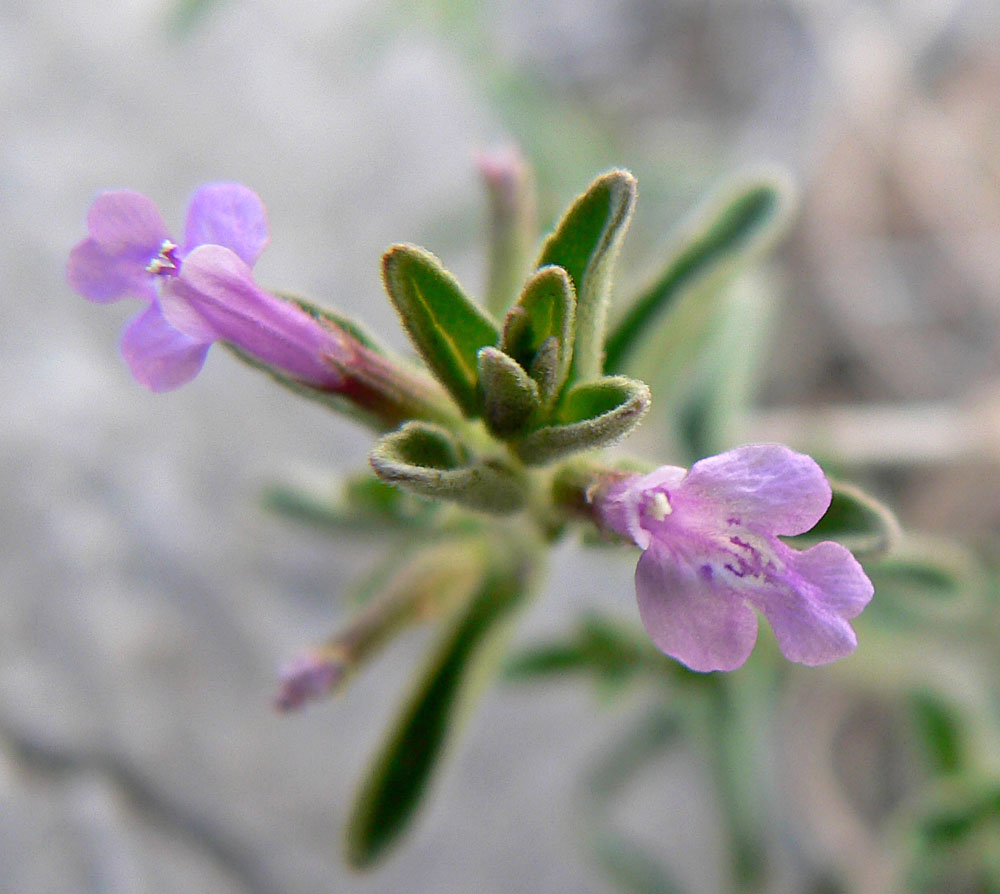

Conservation status
- Secure (NatureServe)

Scientific classification
- Kingdom: Plantae
- Clade: Tracheophytes
- Clade: Angiosperms
- Clade: Eudicots
- Clade: Asterids
- Order: Lamiales
- Family: Lamiaceae
- Genus: Hedeoma
- Species: H. drummondii

Binomial name
- Hedeoma drummondii Benth.

Varieties
- H. drummondii var. crenulata R.S.Irving; H. drummondii var. drummondii

Synonyms
- List: Hedeoma camporum Rydb.; Hedeoma ciliata Nutt.; Hedeoma longiflora Rydb.; Hedeoma ovata A.Nelson; Hedeoma sancta Small

= Hedeoma drummondii =

Plant species in the mint family

Hedeoma drummondii is a species of flowering plant in the mint family known by the common name Drummond's false pennyroyal. It is native to western North America, where it is distributed mainly in the United States west of the Mississippi River and adjacent Mexico. This is a hairy perennial herb with an erect mintlike form up to 45 centimeters tall. The oppositely arranged paired leaves are linear to narrowly oval in shape, pointed, and up to about a centimeter long. The leaves have a strong sweet mint scent when crushed. The herb tastes like peppermint and is used as a minty flavoring in parts of Mexico. The inflorescence arises from the axils of these leaf pairs, bearing three to seven flowers each between one and two centimeters in length on short pedicels. The flowers are generally light to deep lavender with some white markings. The fruit is a waxy, mucilaginous nutlet.
