= Oregan Networks =

British software company

Oregan Networks Ltd
- Type: Private limited company
- Industry: Digital TV; Software
- Founded: 1997
- Founder: Mark Perry; Nic Bourne
- Headquarters: London, United Kingdom
- Area served: Global
- Key people: David Berglund (Chairman); Mark Perry (CEO); Milya Timergaleyeva (CMO)
- Products: Digital TV Middleware; System Integration; Consultancy Services
- Number of employees: 100
- Website: www.oregan.net

Oregan Networks Ltd is a global software and services company, providing an embedded middleware platform for delivery of multi-network Digital TV services to hybrid broadcast receivers.

The company's software is utilised in devices deployed by leading telecoms and broadcast operators including British Telecom, Telefonica, CAT Telecom, NTT Plala and Batelco.

A derivative of Oregan's software is also used in retail streaming video products, such as media players and Connected TV's that are sold at retail by brands including Sony, Philips, Dixons and Sharp.

Oregan's headquarters and primary R&D centre are located in London UK, with branch offices in Singapore, Mexico, Korea, Taiwan and Argentina.

== History ==
In its early days, Oregan provided web browser and media streaming software to Sony Computer Entertainment Europe for enabling PlayStation 2 to render the Sony games portal, Central Station.

In December 2009 Oregan launched Onyx, an Oregan branded solution for Connected TVs, which was deployed by UK based LCD TV manufacturer Cello Electronics for distribution by UK retailers such as Marks & Spencers and Dixons. These Onyx powered TVs are understood to be the first Connected TVs to deliver BBC iPlayer content as well as YouTube and other OTT video services into UK homes, but were quickly followed by similar products from LCD TV market behemoths Samsung, Sony and LG due to significant market demand for accessing BBC iPlayer on Connected TVs.

In more recent years, Oregan has seemingly focused on providing technology and professional services to telecoms and broadcast operators, for delivery of Pay TV solutions over DVB and IP networks. Aside from providing software for the BT Vision 2.0 STB from British Telecom in the UK, the company is active in emerging market territories including South America, SE Asia and the Middle East.

In May 2018, Oregan launched advanced set-top box SparQ middleware for Linux and Android TV.

== See also ==
- Digital Television
- Personal Video Recorder
- IPTV
- Video On Demand
- Interactive Television
- Smart TV
- Set Top Box
