= Za'atar =

Levantine herb or herb blend

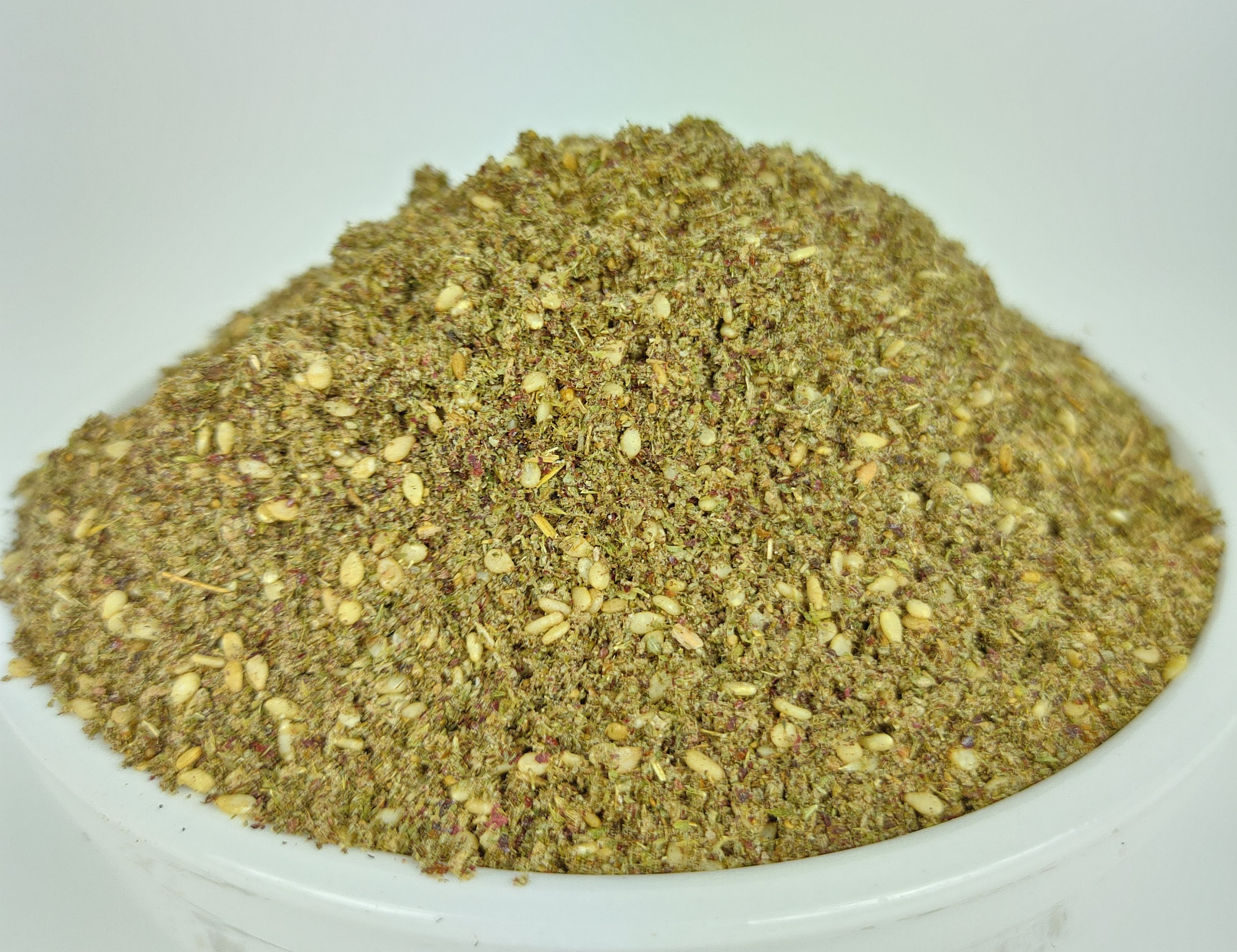
- Type: Spice mix
- Region or state: Levant
- Main ingredients: Origanum syriacum, sumac, toasted sesame seeds, salt

Za'atar (Note: Also romanized zaatar, za'tar, or zatar.) (/ˈzɑːtɑːr/ ZAH-tar; Arabic: زَعْتَر, IPA: [ˈzaʕtar]) is a versatile herb blend and family of wild herbs native to the Levant, central to Middle Eastern cuisine and culture. The term refers both to aromatic plants of the Origanum and Thymbra genera (including Origanum syriacum, known as Bible hyssop) and to the prepared spice mixture of dried herbs (traditionally Origanum syriacum), toasted sesame seeds, sumac, and salt. With roots stretching back to ancient Egypt and classical antiquity, za'atar has been used for millennia as a seasoning, folk remedy, and cultural symbol.

The spice blend varies regionally, with Lebanese versions emphasizing sumac's tartness, while Palestinian varieties may include caraway. It flavors iconic dishes like manakish (za'atar flatbread), enhances labneh and hummus, and is mixed with olive oil as a dip (za'atar-wu-zayt). Beyond cuisine, medieval Arabic and Jewish medical texts, including works by Maimonides, documented za'atar's digestive benefits, and Palestinian tradition associates it with mental alertness.

== Etymology ==
The linguistic origins of za'atar trace back to ancient Semitic languages. Assyriologist Ignace Gelb identified the Akkadian word sarsar as potentially referring to a spice plant, which may represent an early cognate. This term appears related to the Syriac satre (ܨܬܪܐ) and Arabic za'atar (زعتر), alternatively spelled sa'tar (صعتر). Scholars suggest these terms may have influenced the Latin Satureia, referring to plants in the Satureja genus.

The species Satureja thymbra demonstrates this linguistic connection through its various vernacular names across cultures: known as "Persian za'atar" in some contexts, while Arabic sources refer to it as za'atar rumi (Roman hyssop) and za'atar franji (European hyssop). In Modern Hebrew, the term za'atar (זעתר) was adopted as a direct loanword from Arabic.

== Botany and species ==
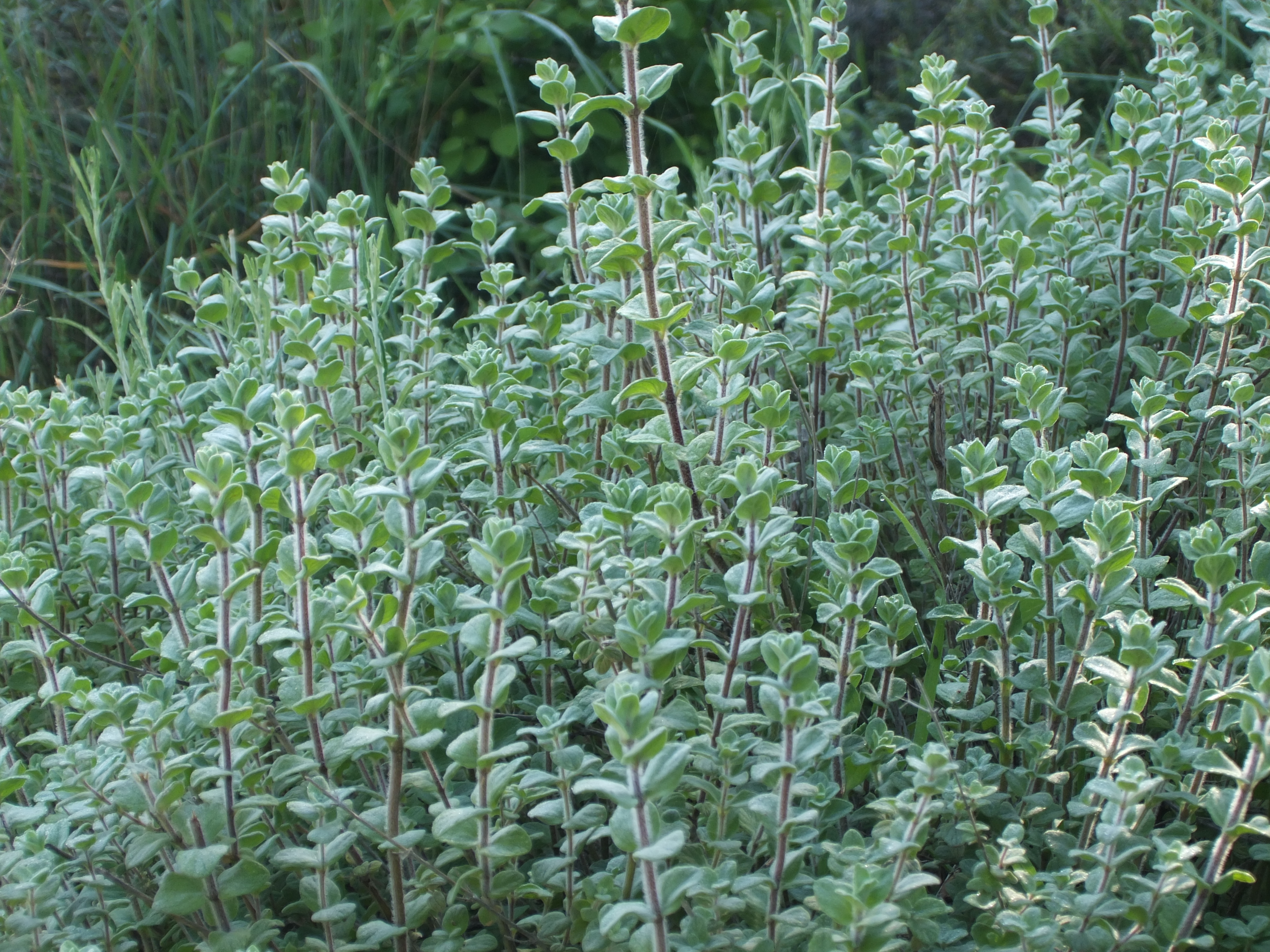
Origanum syriacum, in springtime

Several aromatic plants from the Lamiaceae family are identified as za'atar across the Middle East. The primary species include Origanum syriacum, known regionally as Bible hyssop, Arabic oregano, or wild marjoram. This plant, along with its close relatives Origanum vulgare (European oregano) and Origanum majorana (sweet marjoram), forms the botanical basis for za'atar preparations, though these species are frequently confused due to their similar characteristics.

The designation "za'atar" extends to other aromatic plants, including Thymbra spicata, a Levantine native cultivated in North America by Lebanese and Syrian immigrant communities since the 1940s. Another significant variety, Thymus capitatus (also classified as Satureja capitata), grows throughout the Mediterranean Middle East and holds particular cultural significance in Palestine, where thyme remains deeply tied to local culinary traditions.

Regional terminology sometimes includes Origanum vulgare under the name "wild za'atar" (Arabic: زعتر بري), though it is more commonly known internationally as European oregano or wild marjoram. This species thrives across Lebanon, Syria, Jordan, and Palestine, where it contributes to distinctive local variations of the spice mixture.

== History ==
The use of za'atar plants dates back to ancient civilizations, with archaeological and textual evidence indicating its importance in multiple cultures. In Ancient Egypt, botanical remains identified as Thymbra spicata – one of the species used in modern za'atar preparations – were discovered in the tomb of Tutankhamun (14th century BCE). The Greek physician Dioscorides later recorded that this species was known to the Egyptians as saem, though the precise ancient Egyptian name for za'atar remains uncertain.

Classical sources further document the plant's significance. Pliny the Elder's Natural History (1st century CE) mentions maron as a component of Regale Unguentum ("Royal Perfume"), a luxurious fragrance used by Parthian rulers. While the exact identification of maron remains debated, scholars have suggested possible connections to za'atar-related species.

Jewish tradition has consistently associated za'atar with biblical references. Prominent scholars including Saadia Gaon (10th century), Abraham ibn Ezra (12th century), Maimonides (12th–13th century), and Obadiah of Bertinoro (15th–16th century) identified the ezov mentioned in the Hebrew Bible (Exodus 12:22 and other passages) with the Arabic za'atar. This connection appears in both Rabbinic and Samaritan traditions, as evidenced by the consistent identification across different Hebrew and Samaritan scriptural versions.

== Preparation and variations ==
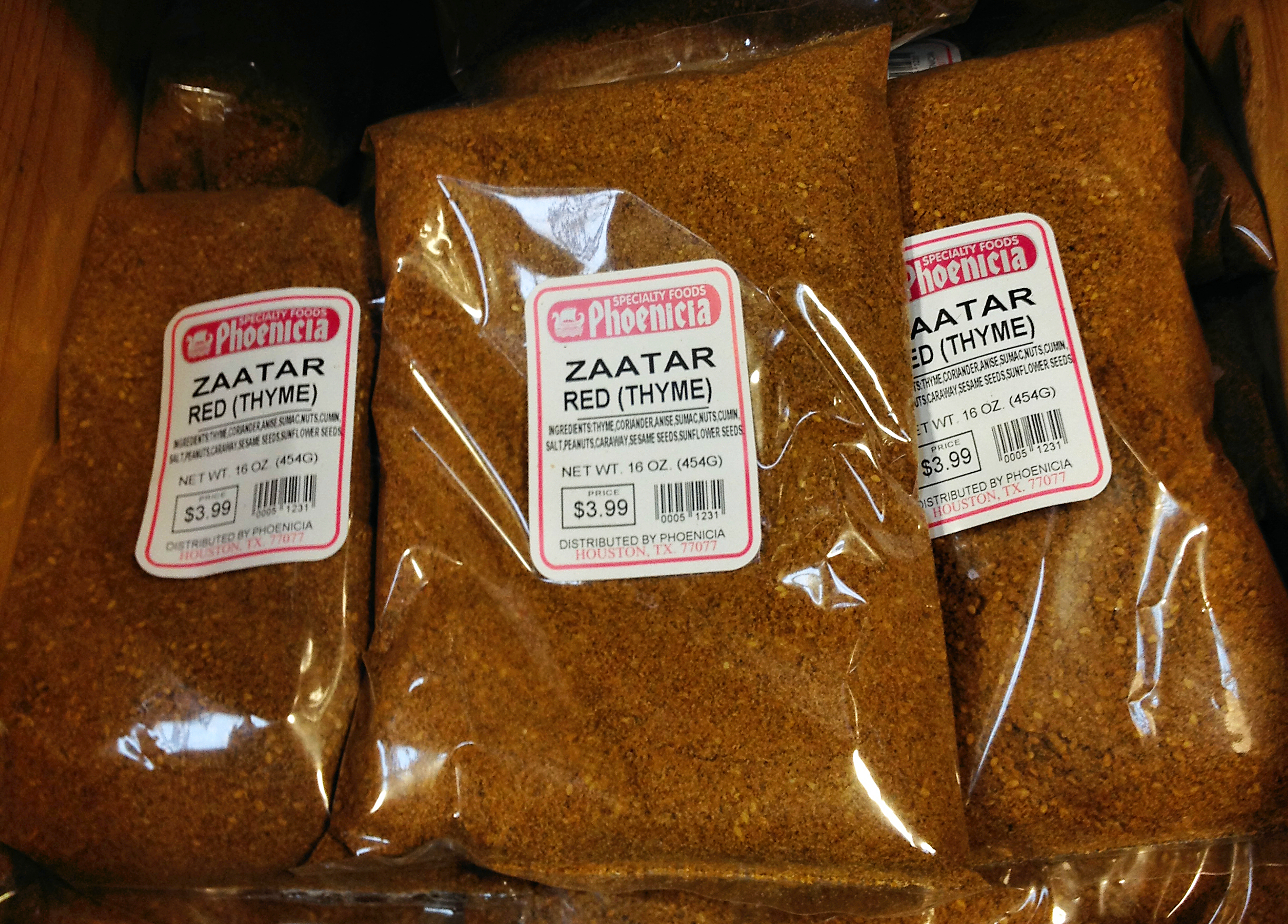
Red za'atar, containing sumac berries

Za'atar refers both to wild herbs of the Origanum and Thymbra genera and to the prepared spice mixture that has become a culinary staple across the Middle East. Traditionally, the condiment is made by grinding Origanum syriacum and mixing it with roasted sesame seeds and salt, often enhanced with sumac berries for tartness. Where Origanum syriacum is unavailable, cooks substitute thyme, oregano, marjoram, or blends thereof, demonstrating the adaptability of this ancient seasoning. This practice of creating household variations throughout the Fertile Crescent, Iraq, and the Arabian Peninsula has contributed to Western observers' challenges in precisely identifying the spice components referenced in historical texts, with some potential early mentions found in the Yale Babylonian Collection though lacking definitive attribution.

Regional variations showcase za'atar's diversity. Lebanese versions are distinguished by their dark red hue from generous amounts of sumac, sometimes accented with orange zest, while Palestinian blends often incorporate caraway seeds for distinctive flavor notes. Commercial preparations have adapted to modern markets, sometimes using wheat flour as a bulking agent or adding spices like savory, cumin, coriander, and fennel seed for complexity. Like other traditional Arab spice blends such as baharat (the Egyptian mixture of cinnamon, cloves, and allspice), za'atar is valued not only for its flavor but also for its high antioxidant content.

== Culinary uses ==
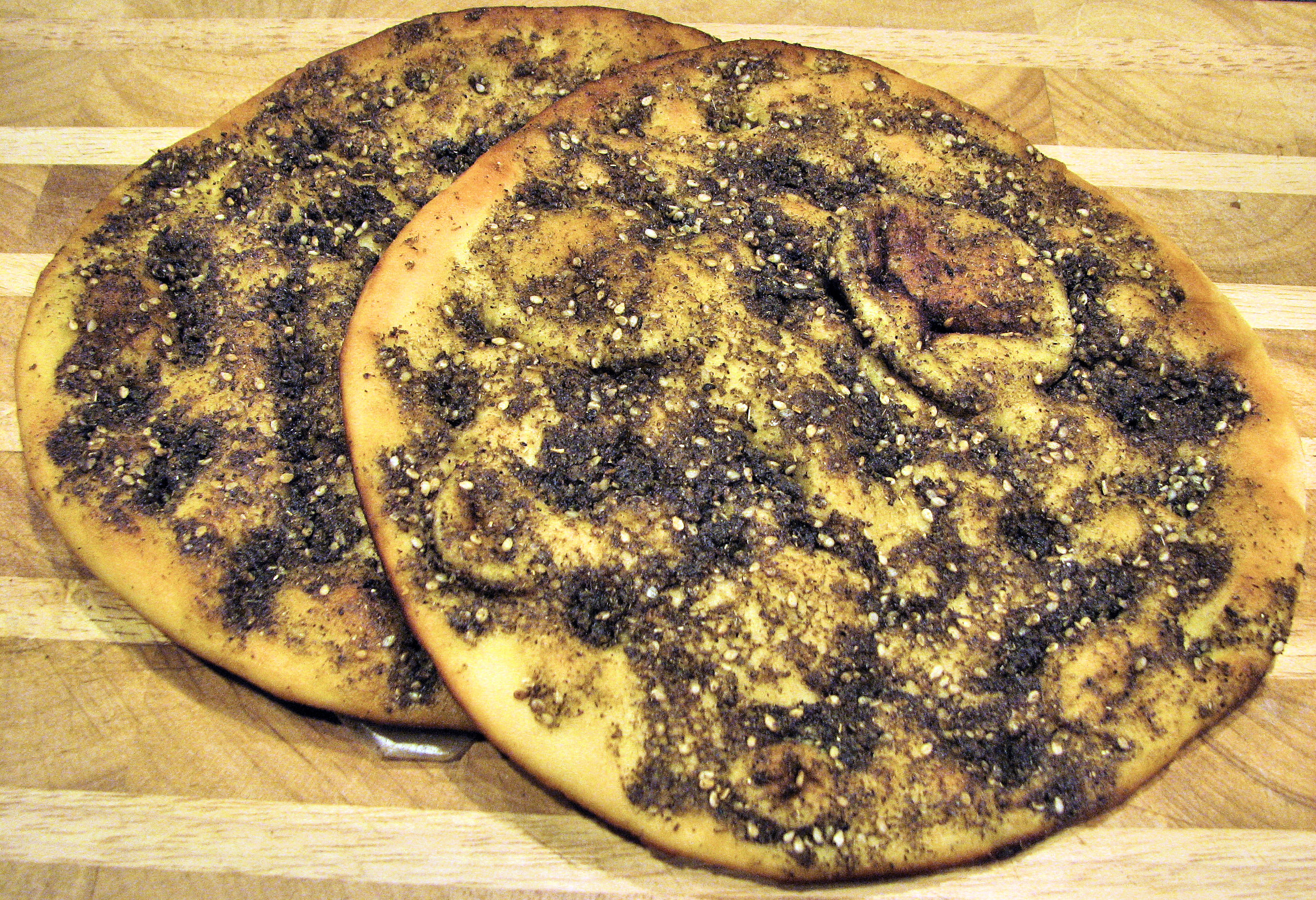
Za'atar manakish

Za'atar enjoys widespread use across Middle Eastern cuisine, both as a dried spice blend and fresh herb. The traditional preparation involves sun-drying the herb mixture before combining it with salt, toasted sesame seeds, and tart sumac.

One of the most iconic uses is in baked goods, particularly manakish bi zaatar – flatbreads topped with a paste of za'atar and olive oil before baking. Similarly, ka'ak, the soft sesame bread popular throughout the eastern Mediterranean, is frequently served with za'atar either as a dipping accompaniment or as a filling. The combination of za'atar with olive oil creates za'atar-wu-zayt (called zeit ou za'atar in some regions), a creamy spread commonly consumed with pita bread.

Beyond breads, za'atar seasons a variety of dishes. It enhances grilled meats and roasted vegetables, adds depth to hummus, and complements dairy products like labneh, the thick strained yogurt cheese. In Lebanon, this pairing reaches its zenith with shanklish – labneh balls cured and rolled in za'atar for a flavorful coating. Fresh za'atar leaves feature prominently in Levantine salads, particularly salatet al-zaatar al-akhdar, which combines the herb with onions, garlic, lemon, and olive oil.

The herb's versatility extends to stuffed pastries like börek and even beverages. In Oman, za'atar transforms into an aromatic herbal tea when steeped in hot water, showcasing its range beyond savory applications. These diverse uses reflect za'atar's integral role in the region's food culture, from everyday breakfasts in Jordan, Palestine, Israel, Saudi Arabia, Syria, and Lebanon to specialty dishes across the Arab world.

== Folk medicine ==
Za'atar has held a significant place in traditional medicine across Mediterranean and Middle Eastern cultures for centuries. Historical records document its therapeutic applications, with medieval Arabic medical texts particularly emphasizing its value. The 13th-century materia medica al-Muʻtamad fī al-adwiyah al-mufradah (The approved book in single drugs), attributed to physician al-Turkomani (1222–1297), classifies za'atar as both a culinary and medicinal herb, specifically noting its efficacy in treating gastrointestinal disorders. The text describes its ability to soothe abdominal pain, strengthen intestinal membranes, and improve digestion.

This medicinal reputation extended across cultural traditions. The renowned Jewish philosopher-physician Maimonides (1135–1204), who practiced medicine in al-Andalus (Iberia), Fez, Acre, Jerusalem, Alexandria, and Cairo, before finally settling in Fustat, recommended za'atar for its health-promoting properties in his medical writings.

In traditional Lebanese and Palestinian folk medicine, it is believed that if children consume it at breakfast it enhances mental alertness before school.

== Cultural and political significance ==
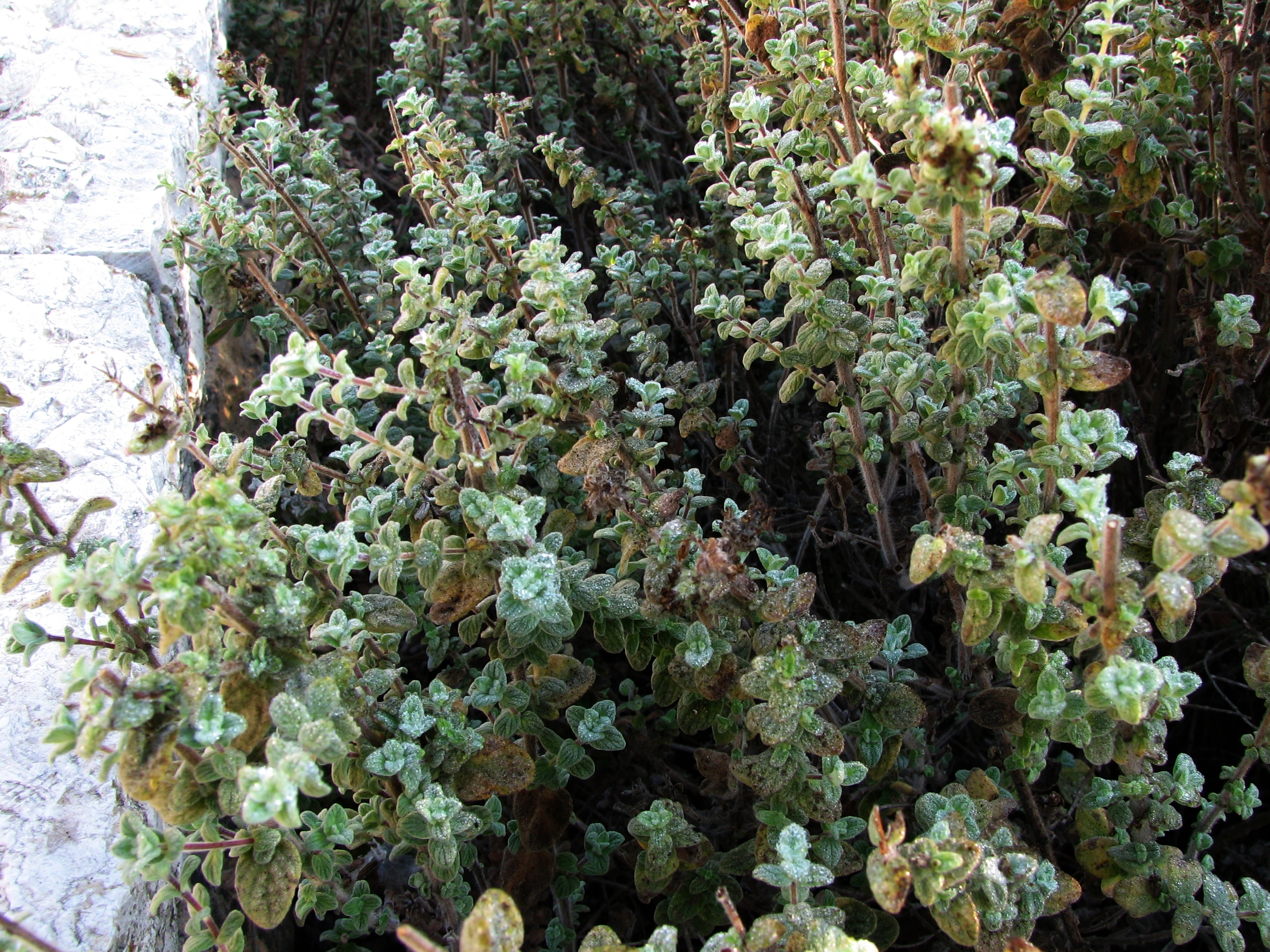
Za'atar shrub growing in Jerusalem

Za'atar holds deep cultural meaning across the Levant, serving as both a culinary staple and a symbol of heritage. The herb has been an integral part of Arab cuisine since medieval times, used alongside other spiced salts in daily cooking. For Palestinians in particular, za'atar carries special significance as a cultural marker – its presence in a household often signifies a Palestinian home, while for refugees, it serves as a tangible connection to their villages and regions of origin.

The plant's significance has evolved in modern political contexts. While traditionally harvested by Arab communities and used in Arab bakeries, za'atar has also been adopted into Israeli cuisine since the mid-20th century. Some Israeli producers market za'atar products using terms like "hyssop" or "holy hyssop," though true Hyssopus officinalis does not grow wild in the region, unlike the common Origanum vulgare.

Conservation efforts have created complex legal situations. In 1977, Israel declared Origanum syriacum a protected species due to overharvesting concerns, with stricter limits imposed in 2005 carrying potential fines for violations. While intended as environmental protection, these measures have drawn criticism from some Arab citizens who view them as restricting traditional foraging practices, with some characterizing the laws as "almost anti-Arab". The regulations extended to the West Bank, where in 2006 there were reported instances of za'atar plants being confiscated at Israeli checkpoints.

== Distribution ==
The use of za'atar spans the Levant, from Lebanon and Syria to Jordan, Palestine, and extends across the Arab world to Iraq, Saudi Arabia, Egypt, Libya, and Tunisia.

== Bibliography ==
- Al-Fasi, D. (1936–1945). Solomon L. Skoss (ed.). The Hebrew-Arabic Dictionary of the Bible, Known as 'Kitāb Jāmiʿ al-Alfāẓ' (Agron) (in Hebrew). Vol. 1–2. New Haven: Yale University Press.
- Allen, Gary (2007). The Herbalist in the Kitchen (Illustrated ed.). University of Illinois Press. ISBN 978-0-252-03162-5.
- Basan, Ghillie (2007). Middle Eastern Kitchen. with special photography by Jonathan Basan. Hippocrene Books. ISBN 978-0-7818-1190-3.
- Carter, Terry; Dunston, Lara; Humphreys, Andrew (2004). Syria & Lebanon. Lonely Planet. ISBN 978-1-86450-333-3.
- Cheshin, Amir S.; Hutman, Bill; Melamed, Avi (2001). Separate and Unequal: The Inside Story of Israeli Rule in East Jerusalem (Illustrated ed.). Harvard University Press. ISBN 978-0-674-00553-2.
- Dalby, Andrew (2000). Empire of pleasures: luxury and indulgence in the Roman world (Illustrated ed.). Routledge. ISBN 978-0-415-18624-7.
- Dalby, Andrew (2002). Dangerous Tastes: The Story of Spices (Illustrated ed.). University of California Press. ISBN 978-0-520-23674-5.
- Faculté de Médecine de Paris (1818). Codex medicamentarius: sive Pharmacopoea Gallica jussu regis optimi et ex mandato summi rerum internarum regni administri. apud Hacquart.
- Gardner, Jo Ann (2004). Herbs in bloom: a guide to growing herbs as ornamental plants. illustrations by Holly S. Dougherty (Reprint, illustrated ed.). Timber Press. ISBN 978-0-88192-698-9.
- Ignace J Gelb; et al., eds. (1980). Assyrian dictionary, Volume 21. University of Chicago. Oriental Institute. ISBN 978-0-918986-05-4.
- Heine, Peter (2004). Food culture in the Near East, Middle East, and North Africa (Illustrated ed.). Greenwood Publishing Group. ISBN 978-0-313-32956-2.
- Ibn Ǧanāḥ, Yonah (1896). A. Berliner (ed.). Book of the Roots (Sepher Haschoraschim) (in Hebrew). Berlin.
- Isser, Stanley Jerome (1976). The Dositheans: a Samaritan sect in late antiquity. Brill Archive. ISBN 978-90-04-04481-4.
- Kaufman, Cathy K. (2006). Cooking in ancient civilizations (Illustrated, annotated ed.). Greenwood Publishing Group. ISBN 978-0-313-33204-3.
- Lien, Marianne E.; Nerlich, Brigitte, eds. (2004). The Politics of Food. Berg Publishers. ISBN 978-1-85973-853-5.
- Maimonides (1963–1967). Mishnah, with Maimonides' Commentary (in Hebrew). Vol. 1–3. Translated by Yosef Qafih. Jerusalem: Mossad Harav Kook.
- Manniche, Lise (1989). An ancient Egyptian herbal (Illustrated ed.). University of Texas Press. ISBN 978-0-292-70415-2.
- Marín, Manuela; Deguilhem, Randi (2002). Writing the feminine: women in Arab sources — Volume 1 of The Islamic Mediterranean. I.B. Tauris. ISBN 978-1-86064-697-3.
- Marks, Gil (2010). Encyclopedia of Jewish Food. John Wiley and Sons. ISBN 978-0-470-39130-3.
- Marshall Cavendish Corporation (2007). Peoples of Western Asia (Illustrated ed.). Marshall Cavendish. ISBN 978-0-7614-7677-1.
- Nabhan, Gary Paul (2004). Why some like it hot: food, genes, and cultural diversity. Island Press. ISBN 978-1-55963-466-3.
- Nathan ben Abraham (1955), "Perush Shishah Sidrei Mishnah - A Commentary on the Six Orders of the Mishnah", in Sachs, Mordecai Yehudah Leib (ed.), The Six Orders of the Mishnah: with the Commentaries of the Rishonim (in Hebrew), vol. 1, Jerusalem: El ha-Meqorot, OCLC 233403923
- Ray, Krishnendu (2004). The Migrant's Table: Meals and Memories in Bengali-American Households. Temple University Press. ISBN 978-1-59213-096-2.
- The Poetry Society, ed. (2006). Poetry on a Plate: A Feast of Poems and Recipes (2nd ed.). Salt Publishing. ISBN 978-1-84471-114-7.
- Roberts, Margaret (2000). Margaret Roberts' A-Z Herbs: Identifying Herbs, How to Grow Herbs, the Uses. Struik. ISBN 978-1-86872-499-4.
- Savill, Joanna; O'Meara, Maeve (2005). The SBS eating guide to Sydney: a guide to Sydney's world of restaurants, cafes & food shops (10th, illustrated ed.). Allen & Unwin. ISBN 978-1-74114-578-6.
- Seidemann, Johannes (2005). World Spice Plants. Berlin: Springer. ISBN 978-3-540-22279-8.
- Swedenburg, Ted (2003). Memories of revolt: the 1936–1939 rebellion and the Palestinian national past. University of Arkansas Press. ISBN 978-1-55728-763-2.
