= Carvacrol =

- Carvacrol

Names
- Preferred IUPAC name 2-Methyl-5-(propan-2-yl)phenol
- Systematic IUPAC name 2-Methyl-5-(propan-2-yl)benzenol
- Other names Carvacrol; 5-Isopropyl-2-methylphenol; 2-Methyl-5-(1-methylethyl)phenol; Isothymol

Identifiers
CAS Number	499-75-2
3D model (JSmol)	Interactive image
ChEMBL	ChEMBL281202
ChemSpider	21105867
ECHA InfoCard	100.007.173
IUPHAR/BPS	2497
KEGG	C09840
PubChem CID	10364
UNII	9B1J4V995Q
CompTox Dashboard (EPA)	DTXSID6042074
- InChI: InChI=1S/C10H14O/c1-7(2)9-5-4-8(3)10(11)6-9/h4-7,11H,1-3H3 Key: RECUKUPTGUEGMW-UHFFFAOYSA-N; InChI=1/C10H14O/c1-7(2)9-5-4-8(3)10(11)6-9/h4-7,11H,1-3H3 Key: RECUKUPTGUEGMW-UHFFFAOYAI
- SMILES: Cc1ccc(cc1O)C(C)C

Properties
Chemical formula	C_{10}H_{14}O
Molar mass	150.217 g/mol
Density	0.9772 g/cm^{3} at 20 °C
Melting point	1 °C (34 °F; 274 K)
Boiling point	237.7 °C (459.9 °F; 510.8 K)
Solubility in water	insoluble
Solubility	soluble in ethanol, diethyl ether, carbon tetrachloride, acetone
Magnetic susceptibility (χ)	−1.091×10^{−4} cm^{3}/mol
- Except where otherwise noted, data are given for materials in their standard state (at 25 °C [77 °F], 100 kPa). verify (what is ?) Infobox references

Carvacrol, or cymophenol, C_{6}H_{3}(CH_{3})(OH)C_{3}H_{7}, is a monoterpenoid phenol. It has a characteristic pungent, warm odor of oregano.

== Natural occurrence ==
Carvacrol is present in the essential oil of Origanum vulgare (oregano), oil of thyme, oil obtained from pepperwort, and wild bergamot. The essential oil of thyme subspecies contains between 5 and 75% of carvacrol, while Satureja (savory) subspecies have a content between 1 and 45%. Origanum majorana (marjoram) and dittany of Crete are rich in carvacrol, 50 and 60–80%, respectively.

It is also found in tequila and Lippia graveolens (Mexican oregano) in the verbena family.

== Sources ==
- Coleus amboinicus
- Lavandula multifida
- Lepidium species
- Lippia graveolens (Mexican oregano)
- Monarda didyma
- Monarda fistulosa (bergamot)
- Nigella sativa
- Origanum compactum
- Origanum dictamnus (dittany of Crete)
- Origanum majorana (marjoram)
- Origanum microphyllum
- Origanum minutiflorum
- Origanum onites
- Origanum scabrum
- Origanum syriacum
- Origanum vulgare (oregan)
- Plectranthus amboinicus
- Satureja spp.
- Satureja thymbra
- Tequila
- Thymbra spicata
- Oil of thyme
- Thymus glandulosus

== Synthesis and derivatives ==
Carvacrol may be synthetically prepared by a number of routes. The fusion of cymol sulfonic acid with caustic potash results in desulfonation. By the action of nitrous acid on 1-methyl-2-amino-4-propyl benzene, one effects diazotization. Prolonged heating of camphor and iodine or carvone with glacial phosphoric acid have also been demonstrated. The dehydrogenation of carvone with a palladium-carbon catalyst has been established.

It has also been prepared by transalkylation of isopropylated cresols.

It is extracted from Origanum oil by means of a 50% potash solution. It is a thick oil that sets at -20 °C to a mass of crystals of melting point 0 °C and boiling point 236–237 °C. Oxidation with ferric chloride converts it into dicarvacrol, whilst phosphorus pentachloride transforms it into chlorcymol.

Thymoquinone is a quinone derivative that can be synthesized through the catalytic oxidation of carvacrol.

== Antimicrobial effects ==
In vitro, carvacrol has antimicrobial activity against 25 different phytopathogenic bacteria and strains including: Cladosporium herbarum, Penicillium glabrum, Pseudomonas syringae, and fungi such as Fusarium verticillioides/F. moniliforme, Rhizoctonia solani/R. solani, Sclerotinia sclerotiorum, and Phytophthora capsici.

== Compendial status ==
- British Pharmacopoeia

== See also ==
- Thymol
- Essential oil
