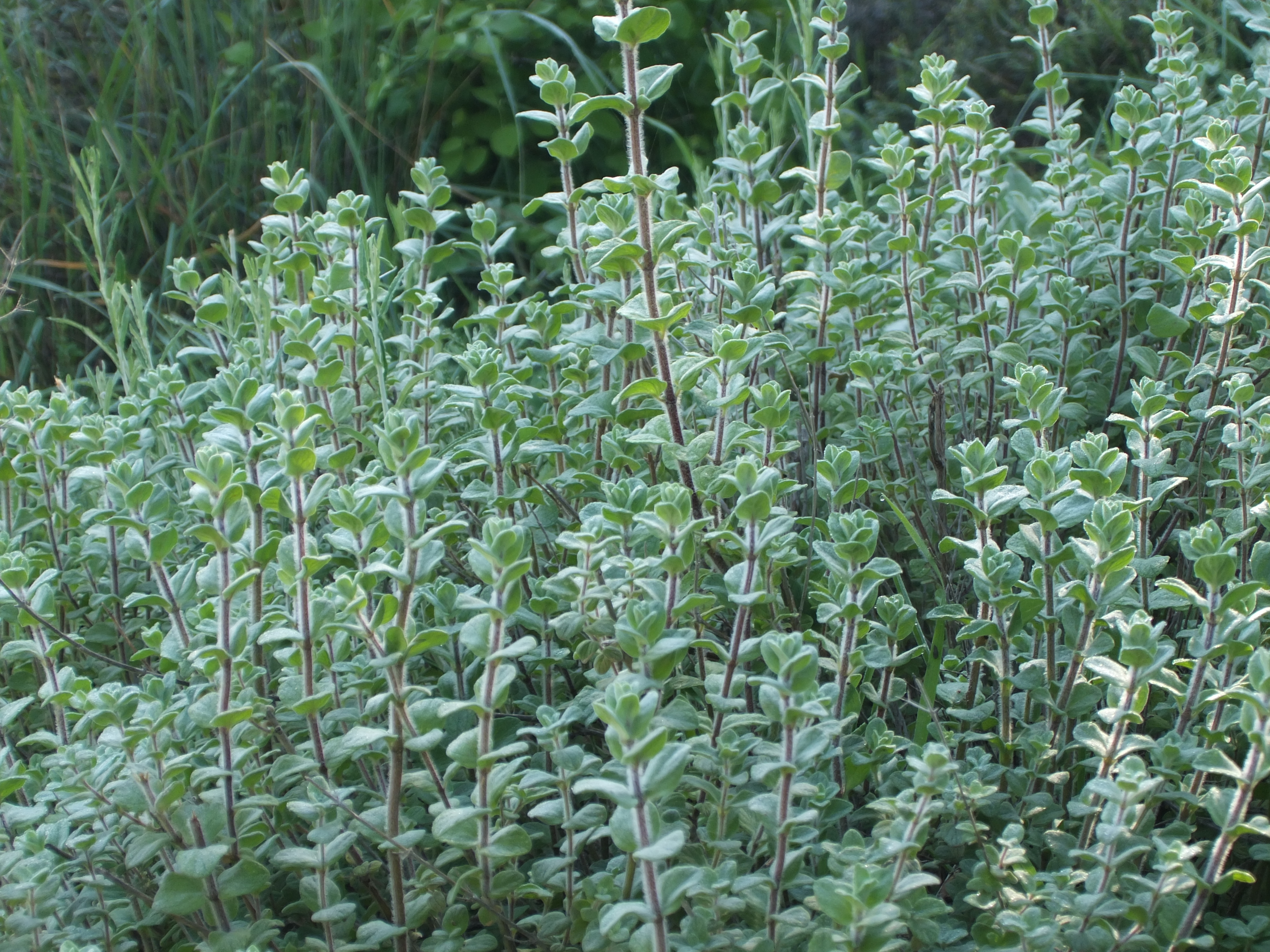

Scientific classification
- Kingdom: Plantae
- Clade: Tracheophytes
- Clade: Angiosperms
- Clade: Eudicots
- Clade: Asterids
- Order: Lamiales
- Family: Lamiaceae
- Genus: Origanum
- Species: O. syriacum

Binomial name
- Origanum syriacum L.

Synonyms
- Majorana syriaca (L.) Raf.; Schizocalyx syriacus (L.) Scheele; Majorana aegyptiaca (L.) Kostel.; Majorana crassa Moench; Majorana crassifolia Benth.; Majorana scutellifolia Stokes; Origanum aegyptiacum L.; Origanum maru L.; Origanum vestitum E.D.Clarke; Zatarendia egyptiaca Raf.

= Origanum syriacum =

Species of flowering plant

Origanum syriacum subsp. syriacum; syn. Majorana syriaca (also Origanum maru, although this primarily refers to a hybrid of O. syriacum), bible hyssop, Biblical-hyssop, Lebanese oregano or Syrian oregano, is an aromatic perennial herb in the mint family, Lamiaceae.

It is a preferred primary ingredient in the spice mixture za'atar.

O. syriacum is native to the Palestine region and was formerly used in ceremonial functions in the Temple in Jerusalem, such as for sprinkling the waters of a purification mixture made by the ashes of a burned red heifer on persons defiled by the dead.

== Etymology ==
The Arabic word zaʿatar (Arabic: زَعْتَر), may refer to one of several plants, as well as the spice mixture of the same name which the plants are associated with. In many English translations of the Bible, ezov is rendered as hyssop, hence the common name for bible hyssop, believed to be a different plant generally identified with Hyssopus officinalis.

Problems with identification arise from Jewish oral tradition, where it expressly prohibits the use of Greek hyssop, and where the biblical plant is said to have been identical to the Arabic word za'atar (Origanum syriacum), which is not to be confused with other types of ezov that often bear an additional epithet, such as za'atar parsi (Thymus capitatus), zaatar rumi (Satureja thymbra), and zaatar mani (Clinopodium insulare).

== Description ==
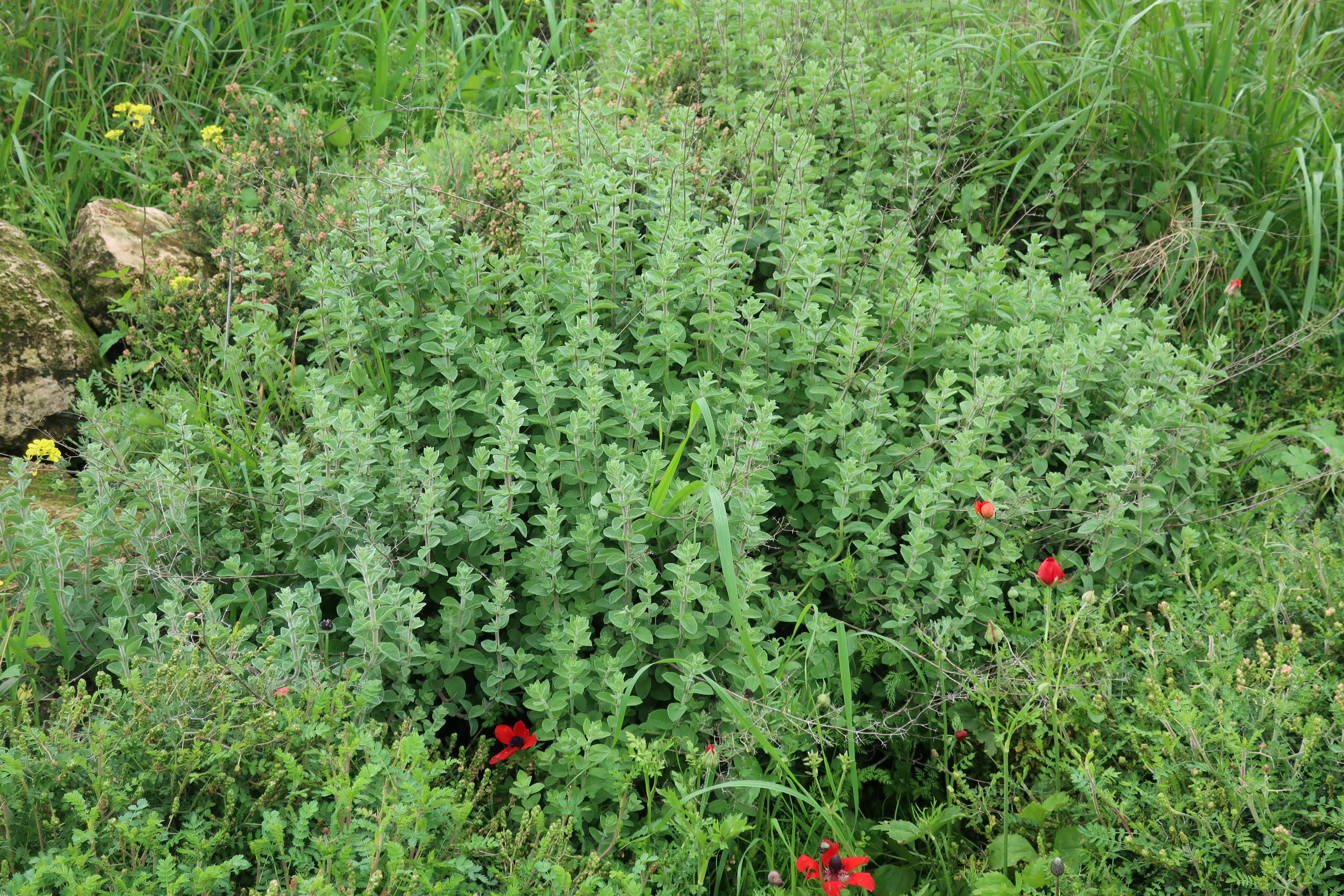
In habitat in the Judean mountains

Origanum syriacum grows to a height of 1 meter. The plant is pollinated by bees. Flowers are small and white or pale pink.

== Distribution ==
Origanum syriacum is native to the Middle East. In Egypt, Origanum syriacum subsp. sinaicum is a very rare plant that grows on stony ground in Sinai Peninsula including the coastal Mediterranean strip. Wild hyssop and sage are protected under Israeli law as endangered plants, but no major studies on their status have been conducted since 1977. Foraging for za'atar is illegal under Israeli law.

== Use ==
=== Food ===
Origanum syriacum is harvested in the wild for use in preparing za'atar, a mixture of dried herbs, sesame and sumac for flavoring and garnish. For example, in Lebanon, a typical za'atar blend often consists of dried leaves from Origanum syriacum and Thymbra spicata. This blend is complemented with ground fruits of Rhus coriaria (sumac), toasted sesame seeds, and salt. It is a common practice to mix za'atar with olive oil at home, creating a spread that is then applied to flatbreads called manakish.

=== Folk medicine ===
In Lebanon, dried O. syriacum is used against gastrointestinal issues such as pharyngitis, stomach aches and cough.

=== Collection and restrictive measures ===
So precious is this herb that in the Levant, native Palestinians will forage and gather it between May and August. However, following the implementation of protective laws, those caught collecting wild hyssop can be prosecuted and face large fines. It has recently entered cultivation due to high levels of demand.

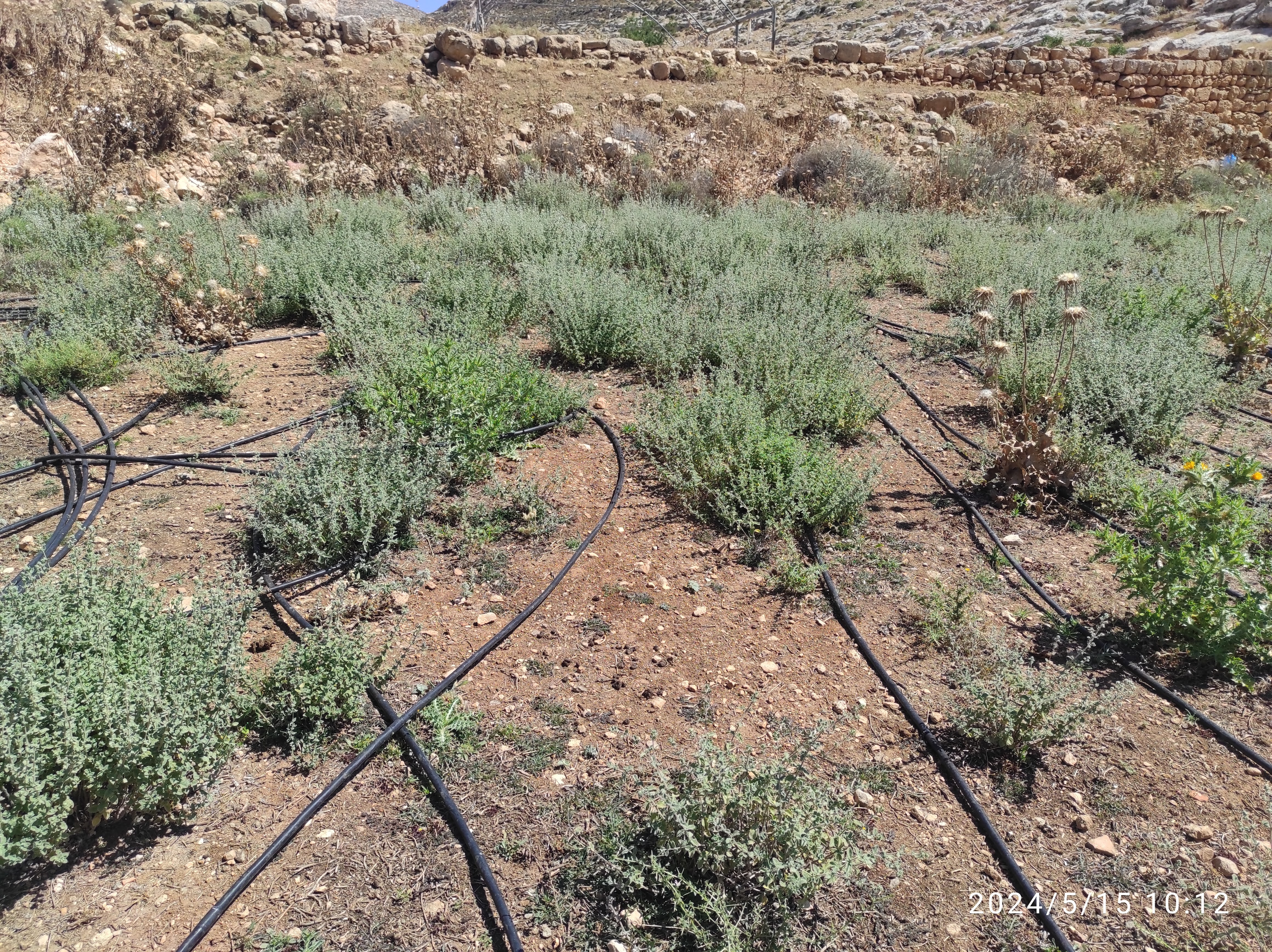
In cultivation in Ein Samiya, Palestine
