= Water of lustration =

Water with the ashes of a red heifer, used for ritual purification in the Torah

The water of lustration or water of purification (Hebrew: מי נדה, romanized: mê niddāh) was the water created with the ashes of the red heifer, according to the instructions given by God to Moses and Aaron in the Book of Numbers.

== Biblical references ==
The Hebrew Bible taught that any Israelite who touched a corpse, a Tumat HaMet (literally, "impurity of the dead"), was ritually unclean. The water was to be sprinkled on a person who had touched a corpse, on the third and seventh days after doing so, in order to make the person ritually clean again. A tent in which someone had died was similarly considered to be unclean.

The water was to be used as follows:

An unclean person they shall take some of the ashes of the heifer burnt for purification from sin, and running water shall be put on them in a vessel. A clean person shall take hyssop and dip it in the water, sprinkle it on the tent, on all the vessels, on the persons who were there, or on the one who touched a bone, the slain, the dead, or a grave. The clean person shall sprinkle the unclean on the third day and on the seventh day; and on the seventh day he shall purify himself, wash his clothes, and bathe in water; and at evening he shall be clean.

The water was used again in Numbers 31:23 for the purification on the metallic booty brought back by the Israelites following their victory over the Midianites.

In other biblical translations the water is referred to as water of expiation (Douay–Rheims Bible), water of separation (King James Version), water of cleansing (New International Version) or water for impurity (American Standard Version, Revised Standard Version). The Jerusalem Bible uses the term lustral water. In Hebrew, the water was called mei niddah (מי נדה) by the Torah and mei chatat by Chazal.

== Commentaries ==
John Wesley stated that the term 'water of separation' indicated that the water was 'appointed for the cleansing of them that are in a state of separation, who for their uncleanness are separated from the congregation'. Thomas Coke noted that 'the heathens had their water of lustration with which to sprinkle themselves in token of purification', and thought this was probably borrowed from the Mosaic law. Albert Barnes used both terms: 'the water of purification' to describe the purifying effect of the water, and 'the water of separation' to refer to the state of legal separation from the community, for which the water was to act as a remedy.

== Other uses of the terms ==
Annie Dillard, in Pilgrim at Tinker Creek, drew from her meditations at Tinker Creek in Virginia the experience of flowing water as a cause of separation:

These are the waters of beauty and mystery, issuing from a gap in the granite world; .... and these are also the waters of separation: they purify, acrid and laving, and they cut me off.

== See also ==
- Holy water
