= Yimakh shemo =

Hebrew curse

Yimakh shemo (Hebrew: יִמַּח שְׁמוֹ, romanized: yimmaḥ šəmō, lit. 'may his name be erased') is a Hebrew curse placed after the name of particular enemies of the Jewish people, or on rare occasions, after the name of evildoing Jews. A variant is yimakh shemo v'zikhro (Hebrew: יִמַּח שְׁמוֹ וְזִכְרוֹ, romanized: yīmmaḥ šəmō vəzīḵrō, lit. 'may his name and his remembrance be erased').

== Usage ==
The term, although Hebrew, may be inserted as a set phrase in languages other than Hebrew, including Yiddish, for example, "Dos iz a kol-boynik, yemakh-shmoy!" ("He is a scoundrel, yemakh-shmoy!") and English. When the phrase is used in English of plurals the Hebrew plural -am ("their names and their memories" yimach shemam ve-zichram) is applied. The epithet may be abbreviated as "Y. S." in some English texts. In Hebrew the abbreviation is (יש״ו) y-sh"u The curse connects with examples of erasure of names in other cultures. It has been called "the classic Jewish curse".

=== Biblical origin: Psalms, Haman, and Amalek ===
The phrase has its origins in Psalm 109 verse 13.

13 May his end be to be cut off; in another generation may their name be blotted out. יגיְהִֽי־אַֽחֲרִית֥וֹ לְהַכְרִ֑ית בְּד֥וֹר אַ֜חֵ֗ר יִמַּ֥ח שְׁמָֽם:

The Extra word (vezikhro) originates with Purim and is applied to Haman.

Although the immediate context of the phrase yimakh shemo vezikhro is related to Haman, some sources suggest that the second part of the phrase, "and his memory" (vezikhro), harks back to the instruction to "obliterate the memory of Amalek" (תִּמְחֶה אֶת־זֵכֶר עֲמָלֵק) in Deuteronomy 25:19, and Exodus 17:14. This connection is supported in some sources by the idea that Haman is a descendant of Amalek.

==== Relation to damnatio memoriae ====
The obliteration of Amalek's memory has been compared to the Latin damnatio memoriae by several European academics.

=== Historical national enemies ===
The phrase can also be applied to anyone perceived as "a great enemy of the Jewish nation" such as Sabbatai Zevi, Bohdan Khmelnytsky, Joseph Stalin, Adolf Hitler, Adolf Eichmann, Josef Mengele, and other Nazis.

=== Jesus ===
There are only a very small number of texts where yimakh shemo is used of Jesus, although the tradition that Yeshu (יֵשׁוּ – יֵשׁוּעַ minus the ayin) is related to the yimach shemo has a little popular circulation, maybe an inheritance from medieval polemical traditions. An early introduction of this connection into Lutheran literature was made by convert Johan Kemper.

=== In English and Yiddish literature ===
Saul Bellow places the phrase in the mouth of the titular character of his novel Herzog to comically depict his anger. Leo Haber's The Red Heifer (2001), set in New York's Lower East Side in the 1940s, includes the term in a glossary.

== Derived Jewish terms ==
In Yiddish a derived noun, formed with the Slavonic -nik nominalizing suffix, is yemakh-shmoynik 'scoundrel' (feminine yemakh-shmoynitse), but this is not used with the strength of the original epithet yemakh-shmoy.

The term yimakh shemo is often used in combination with the term meshummad from the root shamad, which signifies to destroy.

== See also ==
- Grager
- Honorifics for the dead in Judaism, which include terms with the opposite function
