= Eliyahueyni ben HaKof =

Eliyahueyni ben HaKof was a tanna of the (3rd tannaitic generation) and served as a priest in the Second Temple, mentioned once in the Mishnah.

== Period ==
Eliyahueyni ben HaKof lived during the third tannaitic generation, the fifth generation after the Great Assembly.

He as appointed by King Agrippa to the High Priest for 2 years, 27–25 years before the destruction of the Second Temple.

He died in 621 year from fourth millennium.

== About ==
"Eliyahueyni ben HaKof" performed the seventh Red heifer ritual after Ezra.

The author of "Beer Sheva" believes that the Book "Tanna Devei Eliyahu" was composed by "Eliyahueyni ben HaKof", but Rabbi Chaim Yosef David Azulai z"l dispute this opinion.
