= Johan Kemper =

- Born: Moshe ben Aharon (Hebrew: משה בן אהרון) c. 1670; Kraków, Polish–Lithuanian Commonwealth
- Died: 3 May 1716 (O.S.); 14 May 1716 (N.S.); Uppsala, Swedish Empire
- Other names: Moses Aaron; Johann Christian Jacob
- Occupation(s): Schoolmaster (Melamed); Hebrew teacher Author
- Notable work: Likutei ha-Zohar; Me'irat Einayim; Eyn Sheyn Purim Shpil
- Spouses: Siphra; Anna Strömer (m. 1701)

Johan Kemper (1670–1716), formerly Moshe ben Aharon Ha-Kohen of Kraków or Moses Aaron, baptized Johann Christian Jacob; was a Polish Sabbatean Jew who converted from Judaism to Lutheran Christianity. His conversion was motivated by his studies in Kabbalah and his disappointment following the failure of a prophecy spread by the Polish Sabbatean prophet Zadok of Grodno, which predicted that Sabbatai Zevi would return in the year 1695/6. It is unclear whether he continued to observe Jewish practices after his conversion.

Between 1696 and 1698 he worked for the Hebraist Johann Christoph Wagenseil (1633-1705), for whom he composed a Yiddish Purim play.

In March 1701 he was employed as a teacher of Rabbinic Hebrew at Uppsala University in Sweden, until his death in 1716. Some scholars believe that he was Emanuel Swedenborg's Hebrew tutor.

During his time at Uppsala, he wrote his three-volume work on the Zohar entitled Likutei ha-Zohar (Compilations from the Zohar, 1710–13). In it, especially its first part Matteh Moshe (The Staff of Moses, 1710), he attempted to show that the Zohar contained the Christian doctrine of the Trinity.

This belief also drove him to make a literal Hebrew translation of the Gospel of Matthew from Syriac (1703). He also wrote Me'irat 'Enayim (The Enlightenment of the Eyes), (1704) a Christian Cabala commentary on Matthew, which emphasized the unity of the Old and New Testaments and used elements from the Sabbatean and non-Sabbatean Kabbalistic traditions to derive Christian beliefs and meanings from traditional Jewish beliefs and practices.

In his commentary on polemical treatment of Christianity in rabbinical literature he was one of the first Lutherans to comment on the connection between the form of the name "Joshua" used for Jesus in the Talmud, Yeshu, instead of the normal Yeshua used for other figures, and connected the dropping of the final ayin with the ancient curse yimakh shemo.

After his death, Kemper's student Andreas Norrelius (1679–1749) translated the commentary into Latin as Illuminatio oculorum (The Light of the Eyes), (1749).

== Works ==
- Unterthäniger Bericht (1696)
- Eyn Sheyn Purim Shpil (1697)
- Hebrew Translation of Matthew's Gospel (1703)
- Meirat Enayim (1704)
- Likutei ha-Zohar (1710-1713)
