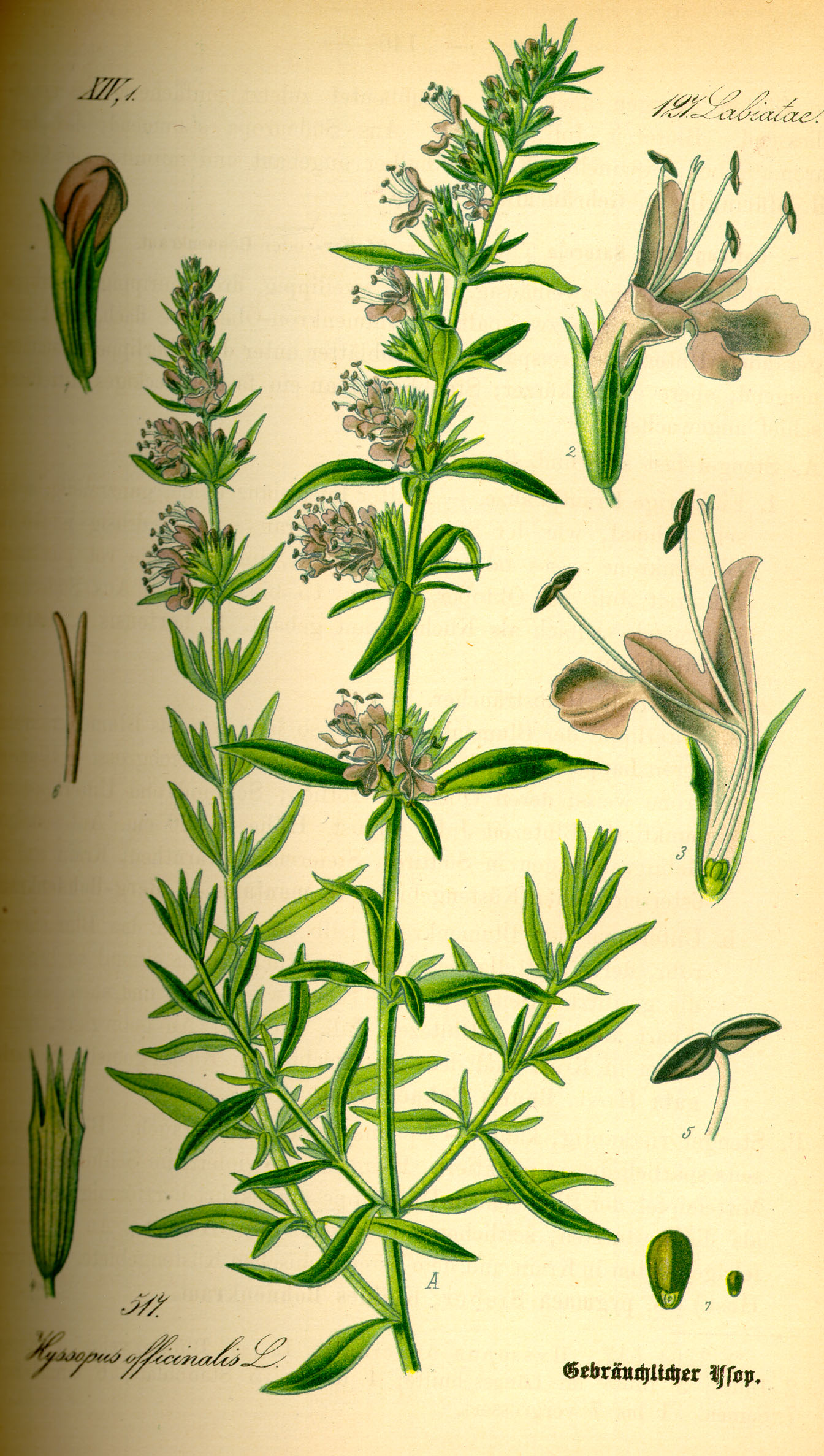
- 1885 illustration

Scientific classification
- Kingdom: Plantae
- Clade: Tracheophytes
- Clade: Angiosperms
- Clade: Eudicots
- Clade: Asterids
- Order: Lamiales
- Family: Lamiaceae
- Genus: Hyssopus
- Species: H. officinalis

Binomial name
- Hyssopus officinalis L.

Synonyms
- Hyssopus alopecuroides Fisch. ex Benth.; Hyssopus altissimus Mill.; Hyssopus angustifolius M.Bieb.; Hyssopus aristatus Godr.; Hyssopus beugesiacus Jord. & Fourr.; Hyssopus canescens (DC.) Nyman nom. inval.; Hyssopus caucasicus Spreng. ex Steud.; Hyssopus cinerascens Jord. & Fourr.; Hyssopus cinereus Pau; Hyssopus cretaceus Dubj.; Hyssopus decumbens Jord. & Fourr.; Hyssopus fischeri Steud.; Hyssopus hirsutus Hill; Hyssopus judaeorum Sennen; Hyssopus montanus Jord. & Fourr.; Hyssopus myrtifolius Desf.; Hyssopus orientalis Adam ex Willd.; Hyssopus passionis Sennen & Elias; Hyssopus polycladus Jord. & Fourr.; Hyssopus pubescens Jord. & Fourr.; Hyssopus recticaulis Jord. & Fourr.; Hyssopus ruber Mill.; Hyssopus schleicheri G.Don ex Loudon; Hyssopus torresii Sennen; Hyssopus vulgaris Bubani; Thymus hyssopus E.H.L.Krause

= Hyssopus officinalis =

Hyssop

Species of plant

Hyssopus officinalis or hyssop is a shrub in the Lamiaceae or mint family native to Southern Europe, the Middle East, and the region surrounding the Caspian Sea. Due to its purported properties as an antiseptic, cough reliever, and expectorant, it has been used in traditional herbal medicine.

== Description ==
Hyssop is a brightly coloured shrub or subshrub that ranges from 30 to 60 cm (12 to 24 in) in height. The stem is woody at the base, from which grow a number of upright branches. Its leaves are lanceolate, dark green, and from 2 to 2.5 cm (3/4 to 1 in) long.

During the summer, hyssop produces pink, blue (ssp. aristatus), or, more rarely, white fragrant (ssp. f. albus) flowers. These give rise to small oblong tetra-achenes.

== History ==
A plant called hyssop has been in use since classical antiquity. Its name is a direct adaptation from the Greek ὕσσωπος (hyssopos). The Hebrew word אזוב (ezov, esov, or esob) and the Greek word ὕσσωπος probably share a common (but unknown) origin. The name hyssop appears as a translation of ezov in some translations of the Bible, notably in Psalms 51:7: "Purge me with hyssop, and I shall be clean", but researchers have suggested that the Biblical accounts refer not to the plant currently known as hyssop but rather to one of a number of different herbs, including Origanum syriacum (Syrian oregano, commonly referred to as "bible hyssop"). 1 Kings 4:33 mentions that 'ezov' was a small plant and some scholars believe it was a wall plant. It was burned with the red heifer (Numbers 19:6) and used for purification of lepers (Leviticus 14:4–6, Leviticus 14:49–51; Numbers 19:18), and at Passover it was used to sprinkle the blood of the sacrificial lamb on the doorposts (Exodus 12:22). A sponge attached to a hyssop branch was used to give Jesus on the cross a drink of vinegar.

Suggestions abound for the modern day correlation of biblical hyssop ranging from a wall plant like moss or fern, to widely used culinary herbs like thyme, rosemary or marjoram. Another suggestion is the caper plant which is known to grow in the rocky soils of the region and along walls.

Hyssop was also used for purgation (religious purification) in Egypt, where, according to Chaeremon the Stoic, the priests used to eat it with bread in order to purify this type of food and make it suitable for their austere diet.

== Essential oil ==
The essential oil includes the chemicals thujone and phenol, which give it antiseptic properties. Its high concentrations of thujone and chemicals that stimulate the central nervous system, including pinocamphone and cineole, can provoke epileptic reactions. The oil of hyssop can cause seizures and even low doses (2–3 drops) can cause convulsions in children.

== Herbal medicine ==
In herbal medicine hyssop is believed to have soothing, expectorant, and cough suppressant properties. Hyssop has been used for centuries in traditional medicine in order to increase circulation and to treat multiple conditions such as coughing and sore throats. Hyssop can stimulate the gastrointestinal system.

== Gallery ==
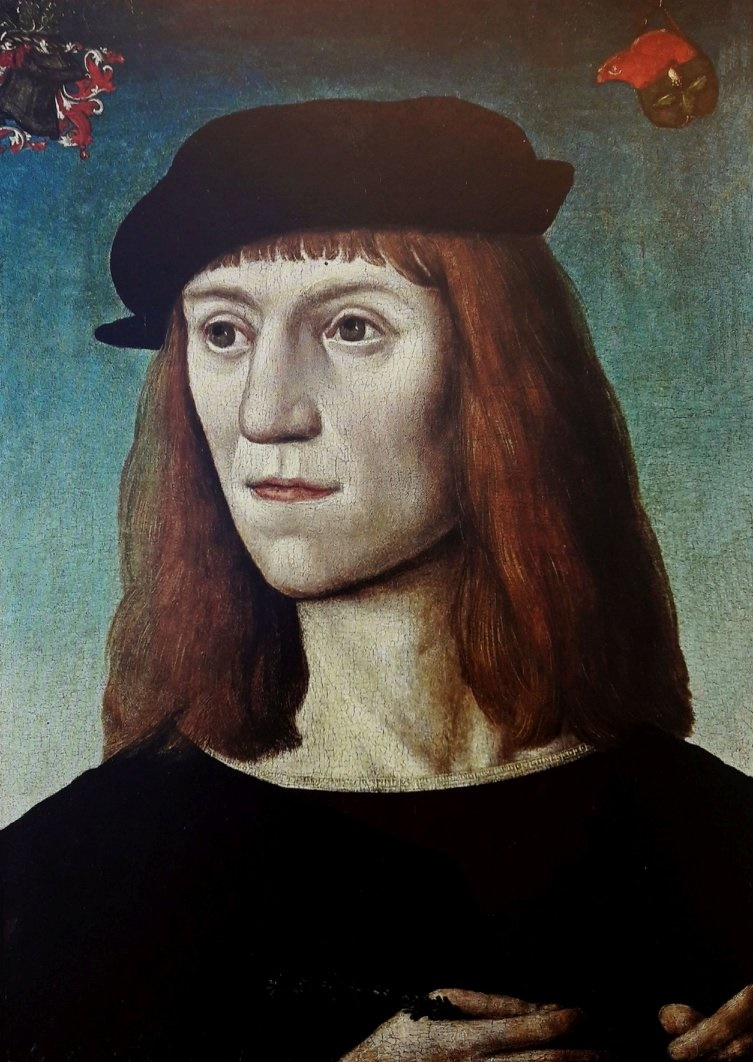
Portrait of Christoph von Suchten holding a hyssop branch in his hand, 1507

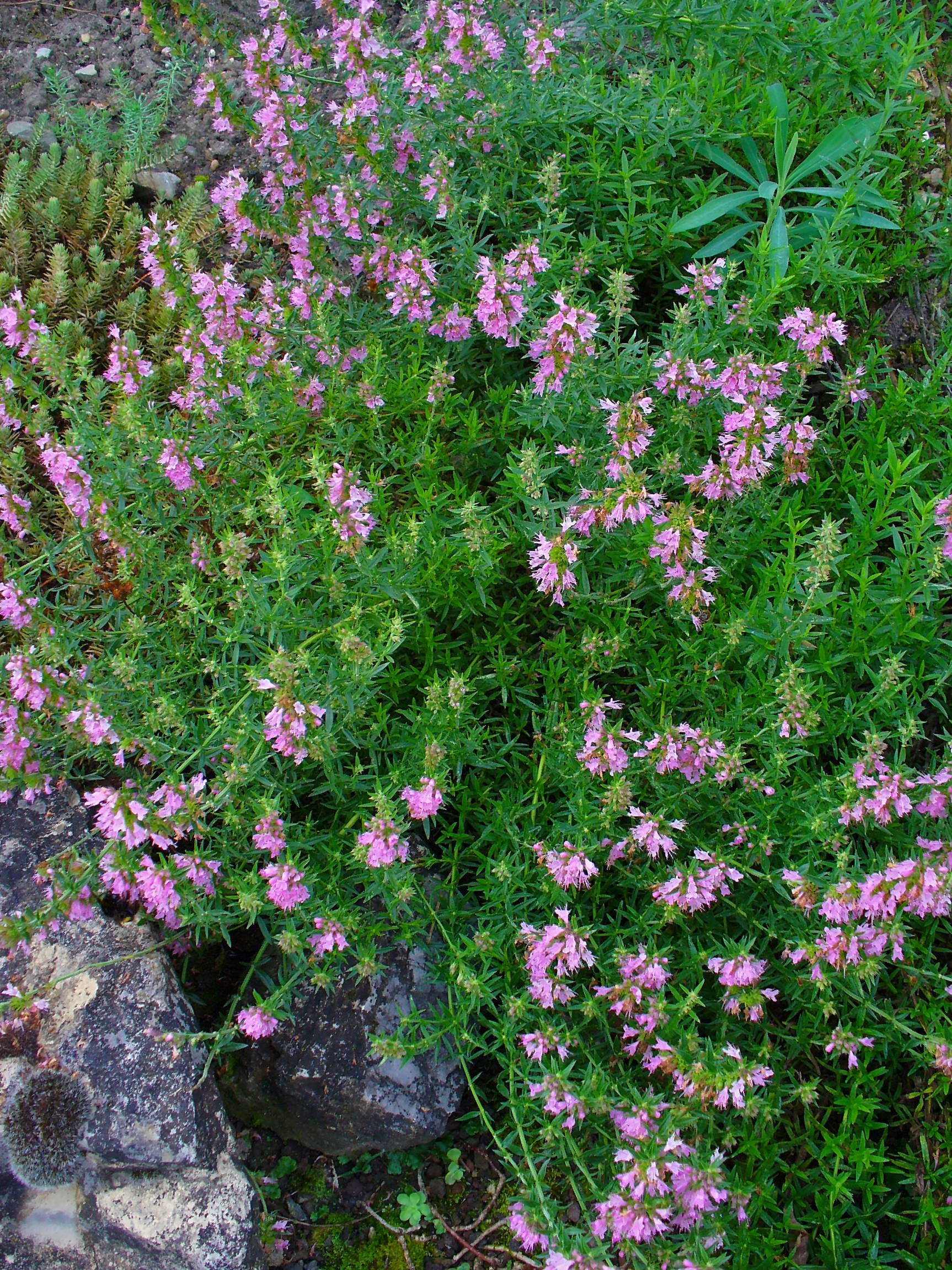
Hyssopus officinalis

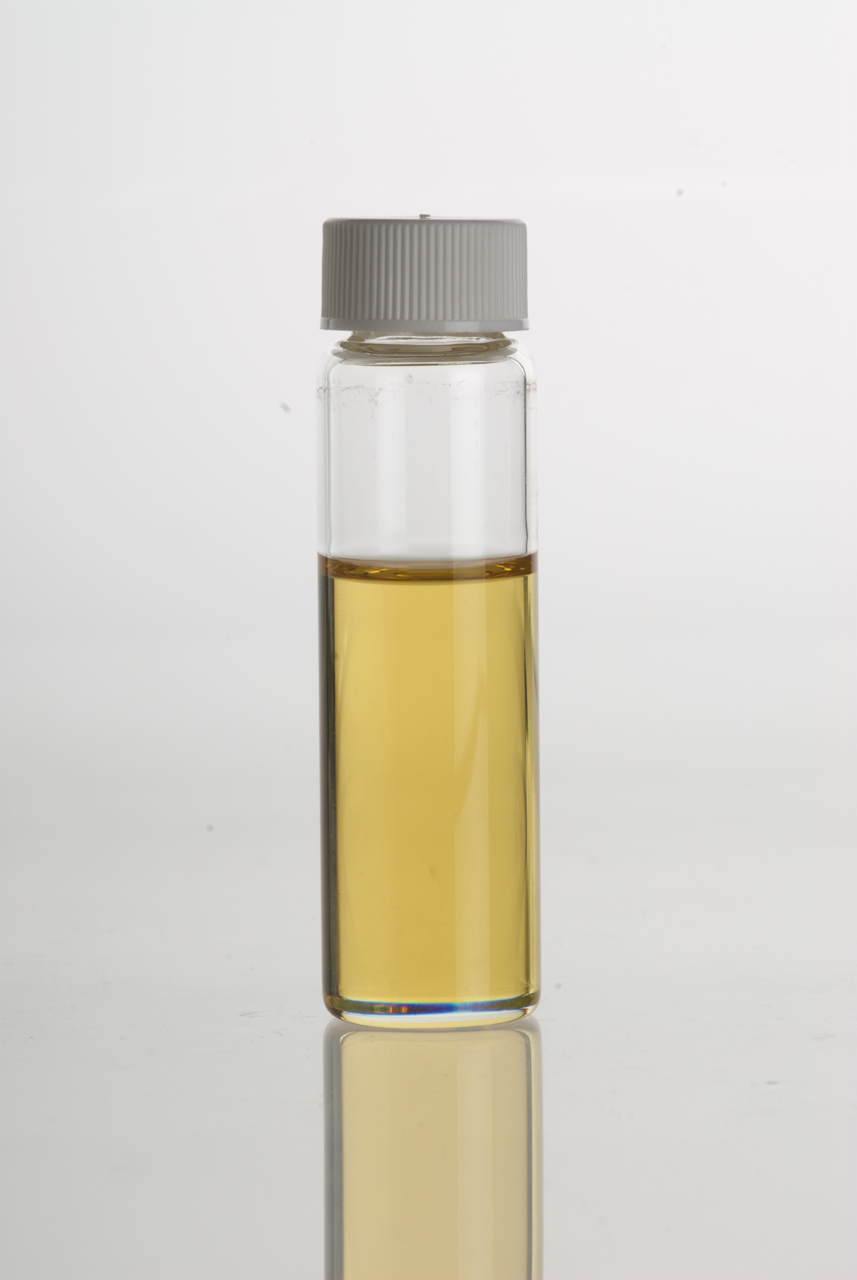
Hyssop essential oil
