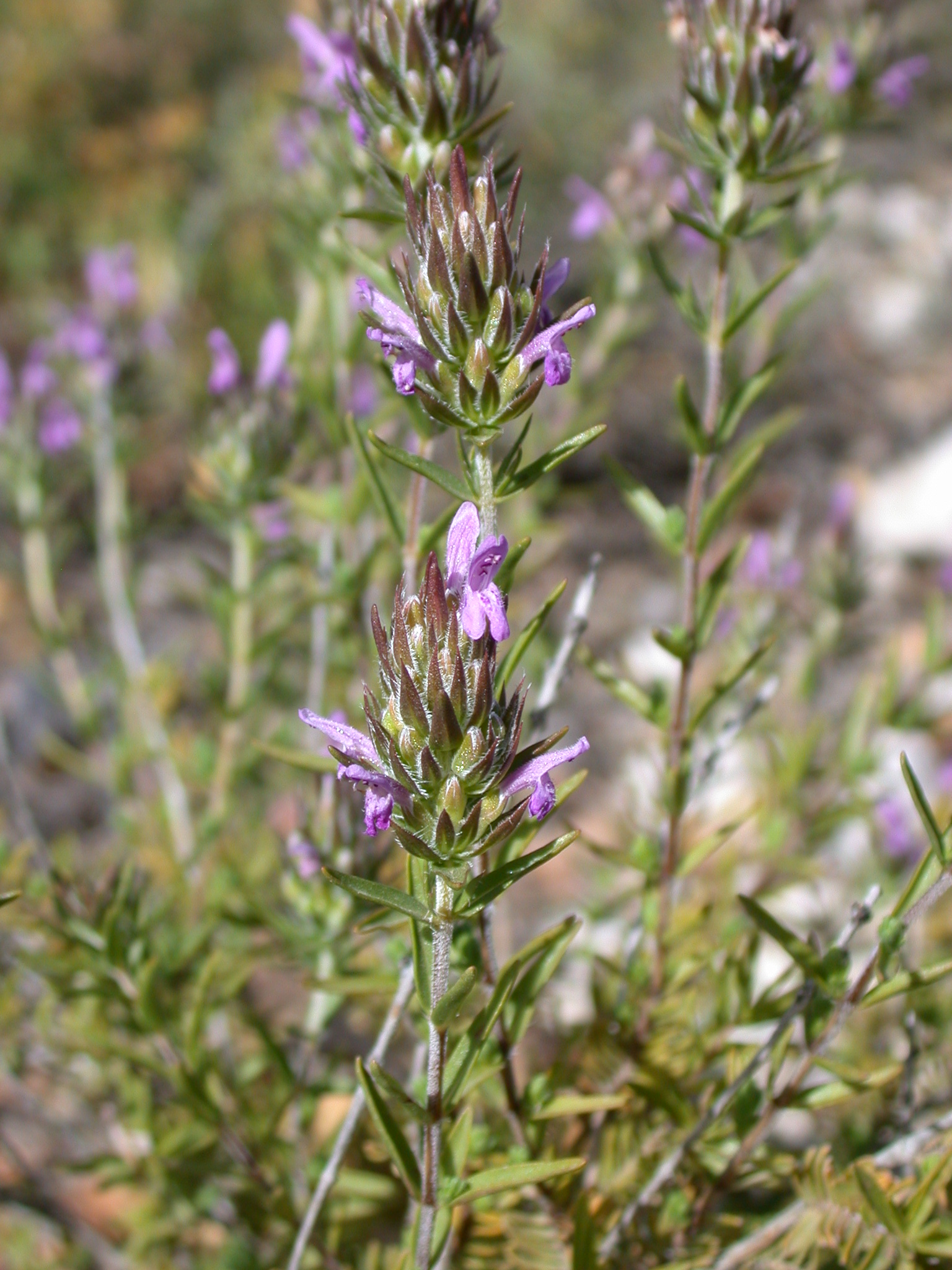

Scientific classification
- Kingdom: Plantae
- Clade: Tracheophytes
- Clade: Angiosperms
- Clade: Eudicots
- Clade: Asterids
- Order: Lamiales
- Family: Lamiaceae
- Genus: Thymbra
- Species: T. spicata

Binomial name
- Thymbra spicata L.

Synonyms
- Satureja spicata (L.) Garsault; Thymbra ambigua (E.D.Clarke); Thymbra verticillata (L.)

= Thymbra spicata =

Species of plant

Thymbra spicata, also commonly known as spiked savoury, spiked thymbra, thyme spike and donkey hyssop, is a perennial-green dwarf shrub of the family Lamiaceae, native to Greece, Cyprus, Turkey, Syria, Lebanon, Israel, Palestine, Jordan, Iraq and Iran, having erect stems bearing strongly scented leaves, rich in polyphenols such as rosmarinic acid, carvacrol (CVL) and different flavonoids.

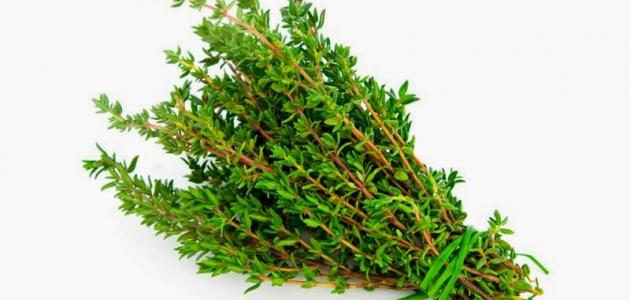
Freshly picked Thymbra spicata

== Description ==
Thymbra spicata resembles Satureja thymbra in the shape and color of its leaves (the former tending to be more linear and arranged in a crisscross pattern), and is quite close to it in the color, size, and shape of its flowers. However, the flowers in this shrub are not arranged in nest-like clusters, as in Satureja thymbra, with gaps between them in leaps, but are crowded together in a dense raceme at the top of the stem. The petiole of the plant is extremely long and narrow, 9–12 mm (3/8–1/2 in) long. The plant reaches a height of 20–30 cm.

The leaves are covered with tiny glandular hairs, and their edges have long cilia. The flowers are bright lilac in color, blossoming between April and June (in Israel) and between June and August (in Turkey). The flowers are arranged at the ends of the stems in dense oval inflorescences that lengthen as they ripen. The plant's leaf glands secrete essential oils, which give to Thymbra spicata its pungent odor. For this reason, the plant is used as a spice (some add it to the spice mixture zaatar), but it is too pungent for making tea.

In Arabic, the plant is known as za'tar sebele (زعتر سبلة), while others call it za'tar farsi (زعتر فارسي). Although the plant is protected under Israeli law, the leaves of the plant are sometimes foraged by the local population between April and June, in preparation for making a spice mixture. In Ottoman Palestine, the flower's pollen was harvested by honey bees in the production of honey.

== Habitat ==
Garrigues are the natural habitat of Thymbra spicata. The plant is typical of exposed marlstone and chalk patches in the mountains, where it accompanies thyme or dominates independent patches. It prefers dry sunny hillsides and high dry meadows.

== Anti-bacterial properties ==
The presence of high levels of phenolic components found in the plant are thought to endow the plant with special antibacterial and antioxidant properties. Its practical use and application in agronomy and in medicine, however, has yet to be fully tested and utilized.

== Bibliography ==
- Daneshvar-Royandezagh, S.; Khawar, K.M.; Ozcan, S. (2009). "In Vitro Micropropagation of Garden Thyme (Thymbra Spicata L. Var. Spicata L.) Collected from Southeastern Turkey using Cotyledon Node". Biotechnology & Biotechnological Equipment. 23 (3). Co-published with Har Krishan Bhalla & Sons: 1319–1321. doi:10.1080/13102818.2009.10817661.
- Hareubeni, Efraim; Hareubeni, Hanna (1949). "The Hyssops: The Roman Hyssop, the Wild one, and the Blue one". Tarbiz (in Hebrew). 21 (1). Mandel Institute for Jewish Studies: 40–46. JSTOR 23585798.
- Shmida, Avi (2005). MAPA's Dictionary of Plants and Flowers in Israel (in Hebrew). Tel-Aviv: MAPA Publishers. OCLC 716569354.
- Tesdell, Omar, ed. (2018). Palestinian Wild Food Plants (النباتات البرية الغذائية الفلسطينية) (in English and Arabic). Rāmallāh: Markaz Khalīl al-Sakākīnī al-Thaqāfī. ISBN 978-9950-385-72-6. OCLC 1050944096.
- Toncer, Ozlem; Karaman, Sengul; Diraz, Emel; Sogut, Tahsin; Kizil, Suleyman (2016). "Diurnal Variation Effects in Essential Oils of Wild Thyme (Thymbra spicata var. spicata L.) Under Cultivation Conditions". Journal of Essential Oil Bearing Plants. 19 (8). Co-published with Har Krishan Bhalla & Sons: 2037–2048. Bibcode:2016JEOBP..19.2037T. doi:10.1080/0972060X.2016.1252694.
