= Ezov =

Plant mentioned in the Bible

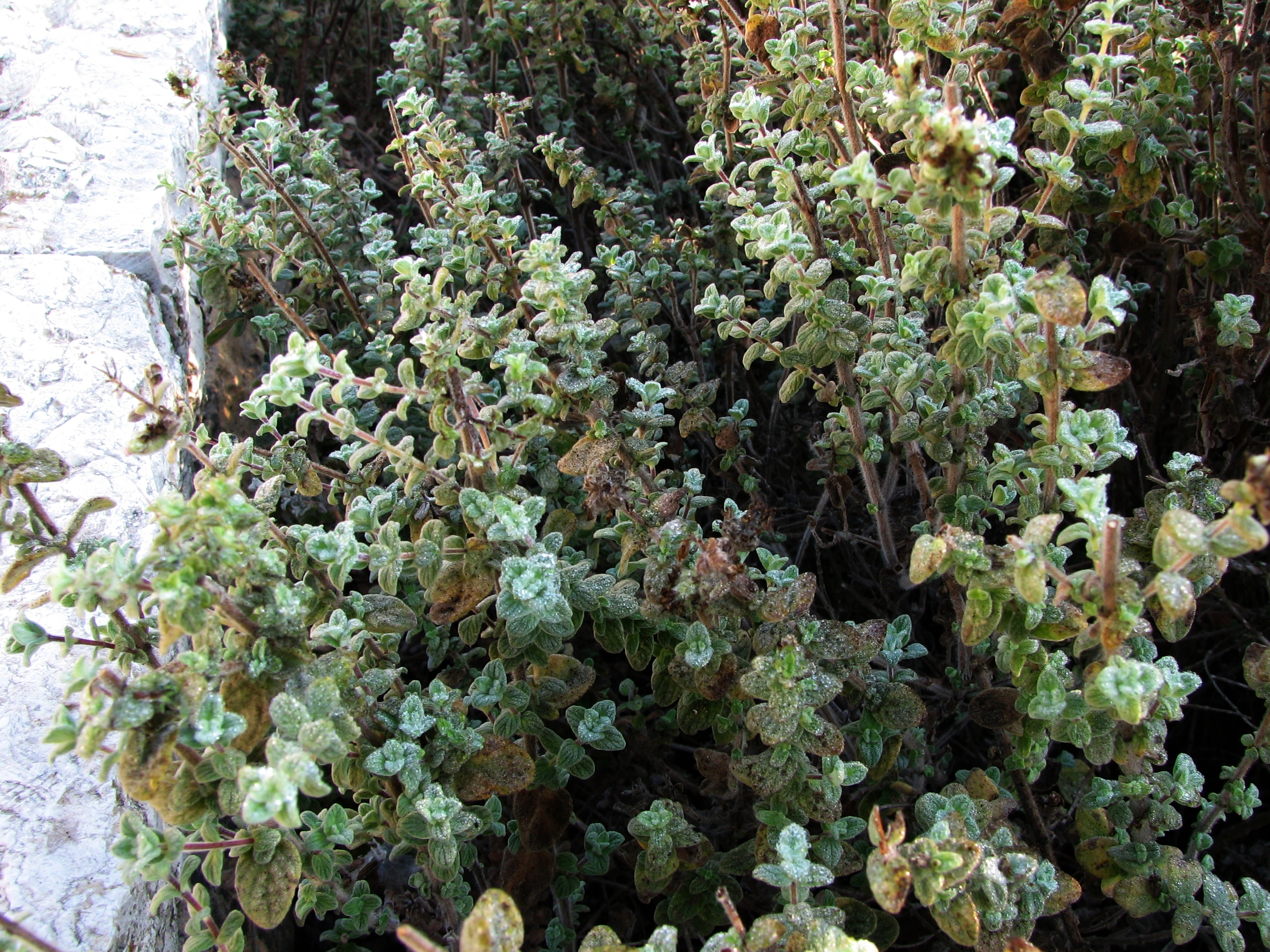
Ezov shrub in Jerusalem

Ezov (Hebrew: אֵזוֹב, romanized: ʾēzōḇ, transliterated in some English-language Bibles as ezob) is the Classical Hebrew name of the plant Origanum syriacum mentioned in the Hebrew Bible in the context of religious rituals.

Maimonides, Saadia Gaon and earlier Jewish commentators identified ezov with the herb Origanum syriacum, which has aromatic and cleansing properties, grows wild in Israel, and can easily be bunched together to be used for sprinkling. Origanum syriacum is the primary ingredient in the spice mixture za'atar.

== Etymology ==
The Septuagint translates Hebrew אֵזוֹב ezov as ὕσσωπος hyssop, and English translations of the Bible often follow this rendering. Ezov and the Greek word ὕσσωπος hyssops share a common etymological origin in an ancient culture word that originated in Asia Minor. While the catalyst for the spread of this culture word is unknown, Asia Minor may have been the place of Origanum’s first ritual usage, from which it spread to other regions. Dioscorides' description of ὕσσωπος indicates that he identified this plant with Origanum (De materia medica 3.25); the Vienna Dioscurides depicts ὕσσωπος as Origanum syriacum.

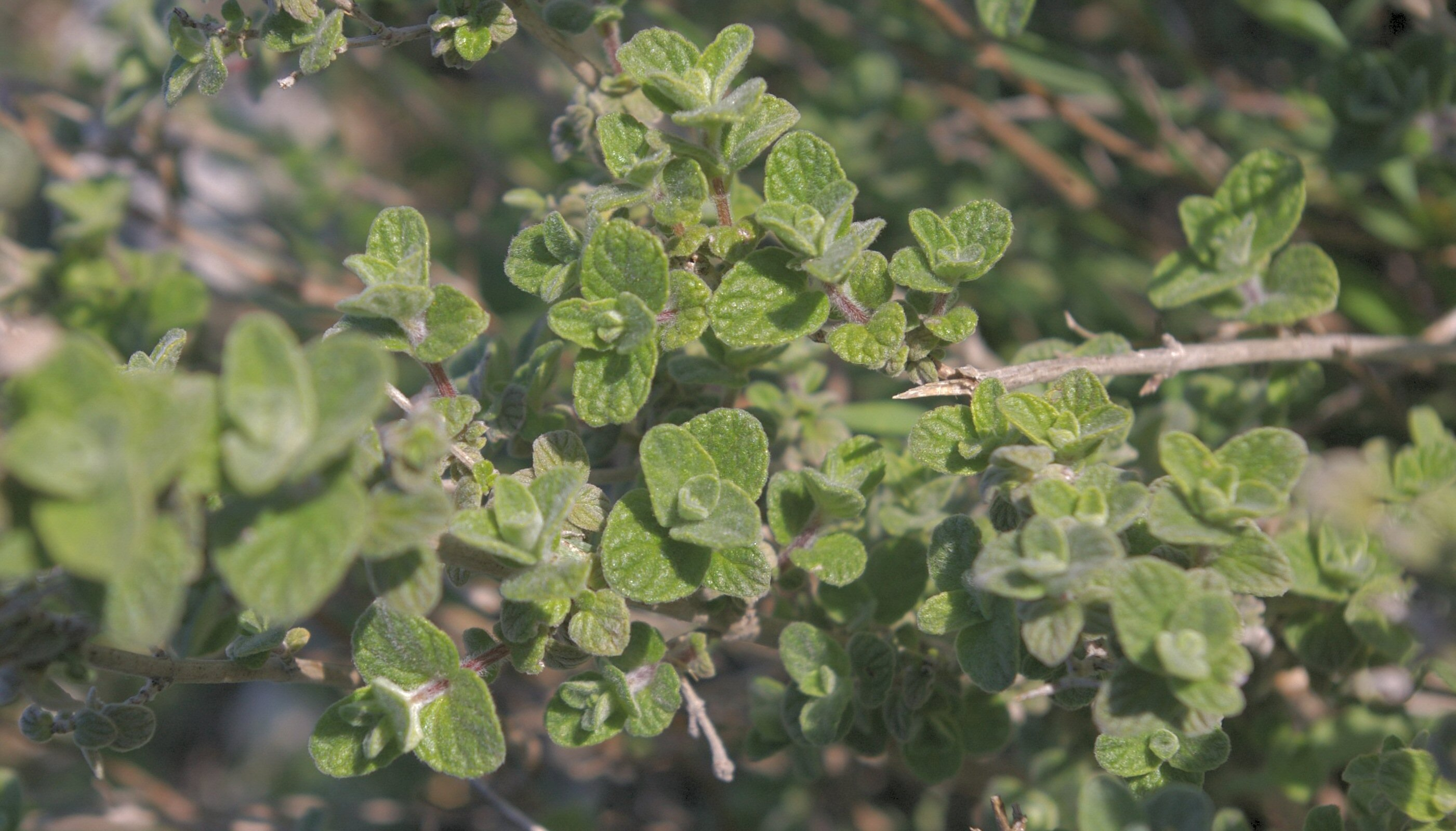
Origanum syriacum

== Old Testament ==
Ezov is described as a small plant found on or near walls, with an aromatic odor.

The Israelites used ezov in the Passover ritual when they were enslaved in Egypt, according to the Hebrew Bible and Old Testament, to sprinkle lamb's blood on the door posts and lintels of the slaves' quarters in which they lived, so that God would pass over them as he slew the first-born of the Egyptians. The Israelites used ezov more regularly for other rituals when they had settled in Israel. It was used in the ritual for cleansing from leprosy and corpse uncleanness, as well as for the burning of the red heifer. In Psalms, the sprinkling of ezov is used metaphorically to refer to purification of the heart.

== New Testament ==
The book of John in the New Testament (written in Koine Greek) mentions that hyssop was used, along with vinegar, to alleviate the thirst of Jesus, during his Passion. Matthew and Mark mention the occasion but refer to the plant using the general term κάλαμος (kálamos), which is translated as "reed" or "stick."

The Roman Catholic Church and some Christian sects interpret ezov as hyssop and have adopted the practice of using it to sprinkle water to ritually cleanse objects, including churches and people, in a ritual termed aspersion during the Asperges.
