= Red heifer =

Cow sacrificed in biblical times

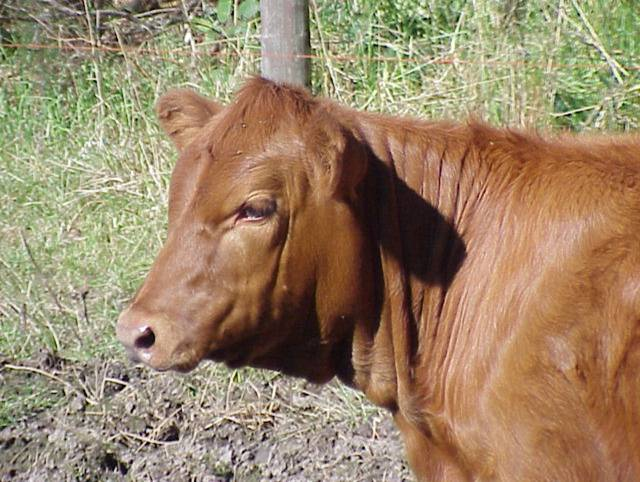
A Red Angus cow which is grown by the Temple Institute for the red heifer sacrifice and burning in the reconstruction of the Third Temple in Jerusalem

The red heifer (Hebrew: פָּרָה אֲדֻמָּה, romanized: pārā ʾădummā) was a red cow sacrificed by Temple priests as a purification ritual in biblical times.

== Ritual in the Torah ==
The red heifer offering is described in Numbers 19. The Torah specifies that the heifer in question must be without spots or blemish, and never yoked or milked. It is slaughtered and burned outside of the camp. Cedarwood, a herb called ezov, and wool dyed scarlet are added to the fire, and the remaining ashes are placed in a vessel containing pure spring water.

To purify a person, water from the vessel is sprinkled on them using a bunch of ezov (hyssop), on the third and seventh day of the purification process. The kohen (priest) who performs the ritual then himself becomes ritually impure and must then wash himself and his clothes in spring waters.

== Rationale ==
The commandment of the Red Heifer appears in Numbers chapter 19 and begins with the words "This is the statute of the Torah" (זאת חוקת התורה). Rabbinic literature presents the Red Heifer as a paradigmatic example of the category of ḥuqqim (statutes), commandments whose rationale is difficult for human beings to understand. A midrash records God as saying to Moses: "To you I reveal the reason for the Red Heifer, but for others it is a statute." Solomon is likewise said to have sought to understand the Red Heifer but concluded, "I said, 'I will become wise,' but it was far from me" (Ecclesiastes 7:23).

According to Rabbi Leib Mintzberg, the Red Heifer nevertheless has a rationale, but its rationale is symbolic; it is therefore termed a ḥuqqah, since the meaning of a symbolic act must be determined by divine revelation. The heifer is associated with the sin offering and atonement for the divine wrath aroused by sin, while its red color symbolizes anger and wrath. The impurity of the dead, in his interpretation, represents the psychological experience of fear and dread associated with death and with the forces of evil symbolized by the Angel of Death. The ashes of the heifer symbolize the destruction of these forces, while purification with the ashes represents the soul's release from the experience of fear.

== Mishnah tractate ==
The Mishnah, the central compilation of the Oral Torah in Rabbinic Judaism, the oral component of the Written Torah, contains a tractate on the red heifer sacrifice and burning, which is the tractate Parah ("cow") in Tohorot, which explains the procedures involved. The tractate has no existing Gemara, although commentary on the procedure appears in the Gemara for other tractates of the Talmud.

According to Mishnah's tractate Parah, the presence of two black hairs invalidates a red heifer, in addition to the usual requirements of an unblemished animal for sacrifice. There are various other requirements, such as natural birth (The caesarian section renders a heifer candidate invalid). The water must be "living" (ie., spring water). This is a stronger requirement than for a mikveh or ritual bath; rainwater accumulated in a cistern is permitted for a mikveh but cannot be used in the red heifer ceremony.

The Mishnah reports that in the days of the Temple in Jerusalem, water for the ritual came from the Pool of Siloam. The ceremony involved was complex and detailed. To ensure the complete ritual purity of those involved, care was taken to ensure that no one involved in the red heifer ceremony could have had any contact with the dead or any form of tumah, and implements were made of materials such as stone, which in halakha do not act as carriers for ritual impurities. The Mishnah recounts that children were used to draw and carry the water for the ceremony, children born and reared in isolation for the specific purpose of ensuring that they never came into contact with a corpse:

There were courtyards in Jerusalem built over the virgin rock and below them a hollow was made lest there might be a grave in the depths, and pregnant women were brought and bore their children there, and there they reared them. And oxen were brought, and on their backs were laid doors on top of which sat the children with cups of stone in their hands. When they arrived in Shiloah the children alighted, and filled the cups with water, and mounted, and again sat on the doors.

— Judah ha-Nasi, Mishnah, Parah

Various other devices were used, including a causeway from the Temple Mount to the Mount of Olives so that the heifer and accompanying priests would not come into contact with a grave.

According to the Mishnah, the ceremony of the sacrifice and burning of the red heifer took place on the Mount of Olives. A ritually pure kohen slaughtered the heifer and sprinkled its blood in the direction of the Temple seven times. The red heifer was then burned on a pyre, together with wool dyed scarlet, hyssop, and cedarwood to ashes. The site on the Mount of Olives has been tentatively located by archaeologist Yonatan Adler.

=== Color of the heifer ===
The heifer's color is described in the Torah as adumah (אדומה), which is "red". However, Saadia Gaon translates this word as Judeo-Arabic: صفرا, romanized: safra, a word translated to English as "yellow". In addition, the Quran shows Moses being told about a yellow heifer (Al-Baqara 2:69).

To explain this discrepancy, Yosef Qafih in his Hebrew translation and commentary on Saadia's work, argues that this is the normal color of a heifer. He explains the Biblical requirement to mean that the heifer must be entirely of one color, without blotches or blemishes of a different color.

A red heifer that conforms with all of the requirements is practically a biological anomaly. The heifer must be examined carefully to ascertain that the hair is entirely brownish red and absolutely straight to ensure that the cow had not previously been yoked. According to Jewish tradition only nine red heifers were sacrificed from the time of Moses to the destruction of the Second Temple. Mishnah's tractate Parah recounts them, stating that Moses prepared the first, Ezra prepared the second, Simeon the Just and Johanan the High Priest prepared the third, fourth, fifth, sixth, and Elioenai ben HaQayaph, Ananelus, and Ishmael ben Fabus prepared the seventh, eighth, ninth.

The extreme rarity of the red heifer, combined with the detailed ritual surrounding it, has lent the red heifer special status in Jewish tradition. It is cited as the paradigm of a ḥoq, a Jewish law for which there is no logic. Because the state of ritual purity obtained through the ashes of a red heifer is a necessary prerequisite for participating in Temple service, efforts have been made in modern times by Jews wishing for Jewish ritual purity (see tumah and taharah) and in anticipation of the building of the Third Temple to locate a red heifer and recreate the ritual sacrifice.

According to one commentary, red heifer ashes were still in use in the time of Jeremiah (III) in the fourth century CE.

== Quran ==
In the Quran, a bright yellow cow or heifer is mentioned, as if coloured by saffron.

The second and the longest Surah (chapter) in the Quran is named "Al-Baqara" (Arabic: البقرة "the heifer") after the heifer as the law is related in the surah.

Quran, Al Baqara, Verses 67-71

Remember when Moses said to his people, “God commands you to sacrifice a heifer.” They replied, “Are you mocking us?” Moses responded, “I seek refuge in God from acting foolishly!”

They said, “Call upon God to clarify for us what type of heifer it should be!” He replied, “God says, ‘The heifer should neither be old nor young but in between. So do as you are commanded!’” They said, “Call upon God to specify for us its color.” He replied, “God says, ‘It should be a bright yellow heifer—pleasant to see.’” Again they said, “Call upon God so that he may make clear to us which cow, for all cows look the same to us. Then, God willing, we will be guided to the correct one.”

He replied, “God says, ‘It should have been used neither to till the soil nor water the fields; wholesome and without blemish.’” They said, “Now you have come with the truth.” Yet they still slaughtered hesitantly!

— Dr. Mustafa Khattab, Quran, Al Baqara

Ibn Kathir explains that, according to Ibn Abbas and Ubayda ibn al-Harith, it displayed the doubtful questioning of the Israelites, who asked multiple questions to Moses without readily following any law from Allah; had they slaughtered a heifer, any heifer, it would have been sufficient for them - but instead, as they made the matter more specified, Allah made it even more specified for them.

== Christian mysticism ==
The non-canonical Epistle of Barnabas (8:1) explicitly equates the red heifer with Jesus. In the New Testament, the phrases "without the gate" (Hebrews 13:12) and "without the camp" (Numbers 19:3, Hebrews 13:13) have been taken to be not only an identification of Jesus with the red heifer, but an indication as to the location of his crucifixion and death in Calvary.

In scholarly discussions on the typology of the red heifer in Christian theology, Melbourne O'Banion explores this symbolism in his article "The Law of the Red Heifer: A Type and Shadow of Jesus Christ". O'Banion highlights how the ritual of the red heifer, as described in Numbers 19, serves as a foreshadowing of Jesus Christ's ultimate, once-for-all sacrifice. He draws parallels between the red heifer's requirement of being "without defect or blemish," its unique role in temple purification, and its sacrifice outside the camp, with Jesus' sinless nature, His atoning death, and His crucifixion outside Jerusalem (Hebrews 13:11–12). O'Banion argues that the red heifer’s ashes, used to cleanse defilement from death, prefigure Christ's power to purify believers from spiritual death through His sacrifice.

== Modern-day red heifers ==
The Temple Institute, an organization dedicated to the reconstruction of the Third Temple in Jerusalem, has identified red heifer candidates consistent with the requirements of Numbers 19:1–22 and Mishnah's tractate Parah. In recent years, the institute believed it had identified two candidates, one in 1997 and another in 2002. The Temple Institute had initially declared both blemishless for sacrifice and burning but later found them to be defective and not suitable for sacrifice and burning. The institute has been raising funds in order to use modern technology to produce a red heifer that is genetically based on Red Angus cattle. In September 2018, the institute announced a red heifer candidate had been born, saying the heifer was currently a viable candidate and would be examined to see whether it possesses the necessary qualifications for the red heifer. In September 2022, five red heifers were imported from the United States and transferred to a breeding farm in Israel for sacrifice and burning. Rabbis have found the cows blemishless for sacrifice and burning. According to news reports, a red heifer was ritually sacrificed in Judea and Samaria on July 8, 2025; however, two black hairs were found, thus disqualifying it from being a valid sacrifice and it was only used as practice.

== In literature and the arts ==
The red heifer is the central metaphor of Leo Haber's 2001 novel The Red Heifer. The novel has been called "a notable contribution to the genre [the Jewish bildungsroman], adding a creative twist omitted by most of [its] predecessors, namely exploring the specific relationship between certain revered biblical stories and life in New York City." In his review in Haaretz, Curt Leviant wrote, "With Leo Haber's poignant, page-turning new novel, 'The Red Heifer,' we may very well have the 'Call It Sleep' of the 21st century... 'The Red Heifer' is a slice of America in a discrete time zone, an entire miniature civilization limned with compassion, perception and wit."

A red heifer plays an important role in the plot of Michael Chabon's novel The Yiddish Policemen's Union, a detective story set in an alternative-history Jewish state in Alaska. The novel won multiple awards including the Hugo, Nebula, and Locus.

The birth of a red heifer is a sign of the coming of the Third Temple for a far-right messianic fundamentalist in the movie Red Cow, set in an illegal religious settlement in East Jerusalem. The coming-of-age LGBTQ film by Israeli director and screenwriter Tsivia Barkai-Yacov premiered at the Berlin Film Festival and won three awards at the Jerusalem Film Festival in 2018.

== See also ==
- Akabeko – Legendary cow from Japan, inspiring a toy
- White buffalo – American bison considered sacred in several Native American religions
- Betizu – Basque red cow guarding local goddess' treasure
