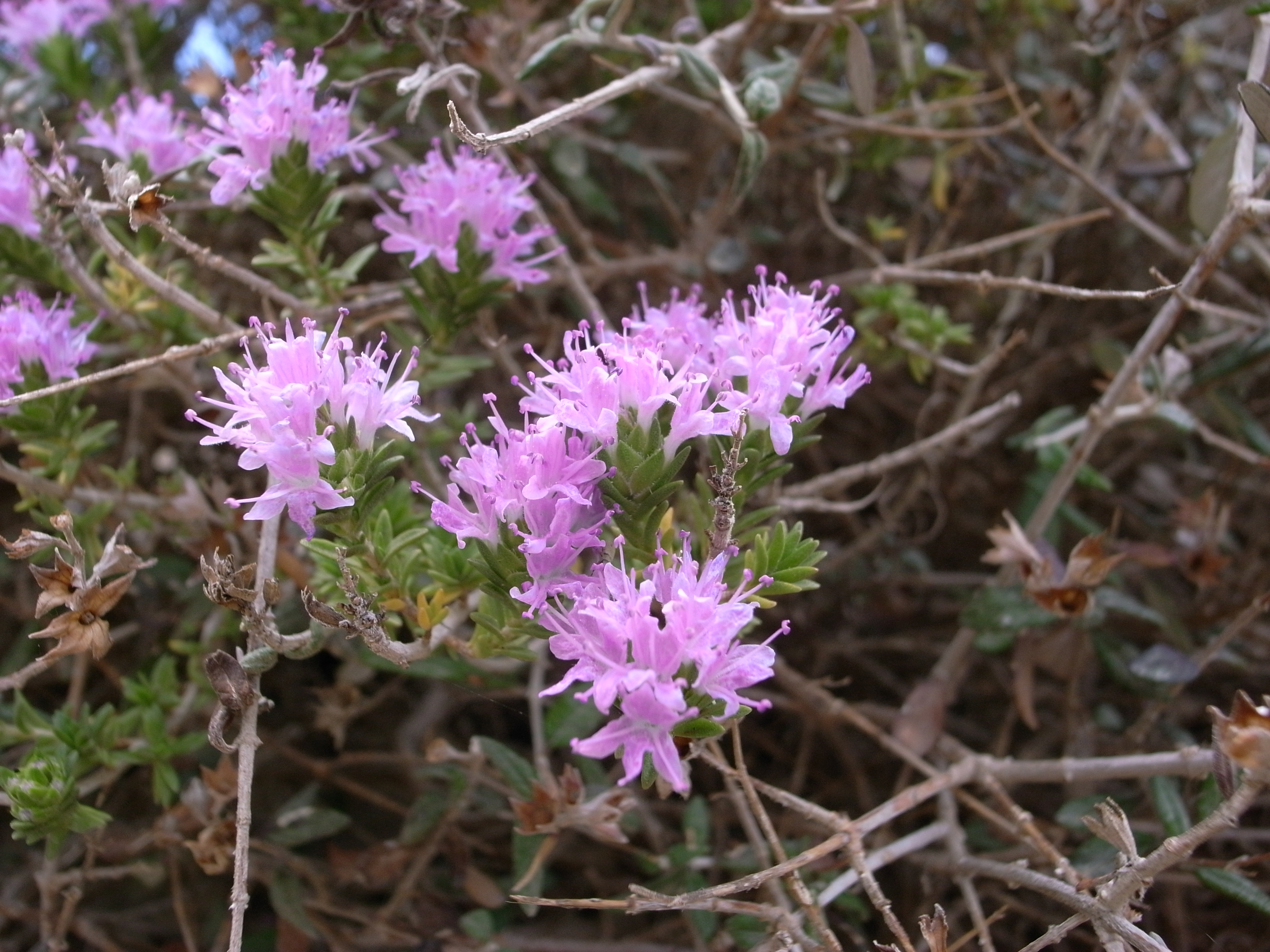
- Thymbra capitata in Malta

Scientific classification
- Kingdom: Plantae
- Clade: Tracheophytes
- Clade: Angiosperms
- Clade: Eudicots
- Clade: Asterids
- Order: Lamiales
- Family: Lamiaceae
- Subfamily: Nepetoideae
- Tribe: Mentheae
- Genus: Thymbra; L.

Synonyms
- Abulfali Adans.; Coridothymus Rchb.f.

= Thymbra (plant) =

Mediterranean thyme

Genus of flowering plants

Thymbra, common name Mediterranean thyme, is a genus of plants in the family Lamiaceae. As currently categorized, the genus has seven species and one subspecies. It is native to the Mediterranean region of southern Europe, North Africa, and the Middle East.

Species

- Thymbra calostachya (Rech.f.) Rech.f. - Crete
- Thymbra capitata (L.) Cav. - widespread from Morocco + Portugal to Turkey + Palestine
- Thymbra sintenisii Bornm. & Azn. - Iraq, Turkey
- Thymbra spicata L. - Greece, Turkey, Syria, Lebanon, Palestine, Israel, Iraq, Iran
- Thymbra thymbrifolia (Hedge & Feinbrun) Bräuchler, comb. nov. - Israel, Palestine, Judean Desert, Khirbet el Mird
- Thymbra nabateorum (Danin & Hedge) Bräuchler, comb. nov. - W of Jordan and the adjacent N of Saudi Arabia
- Thymbra linearifolia (Brullo & Furnari) Bräuchler, comb. nov. - Libya
