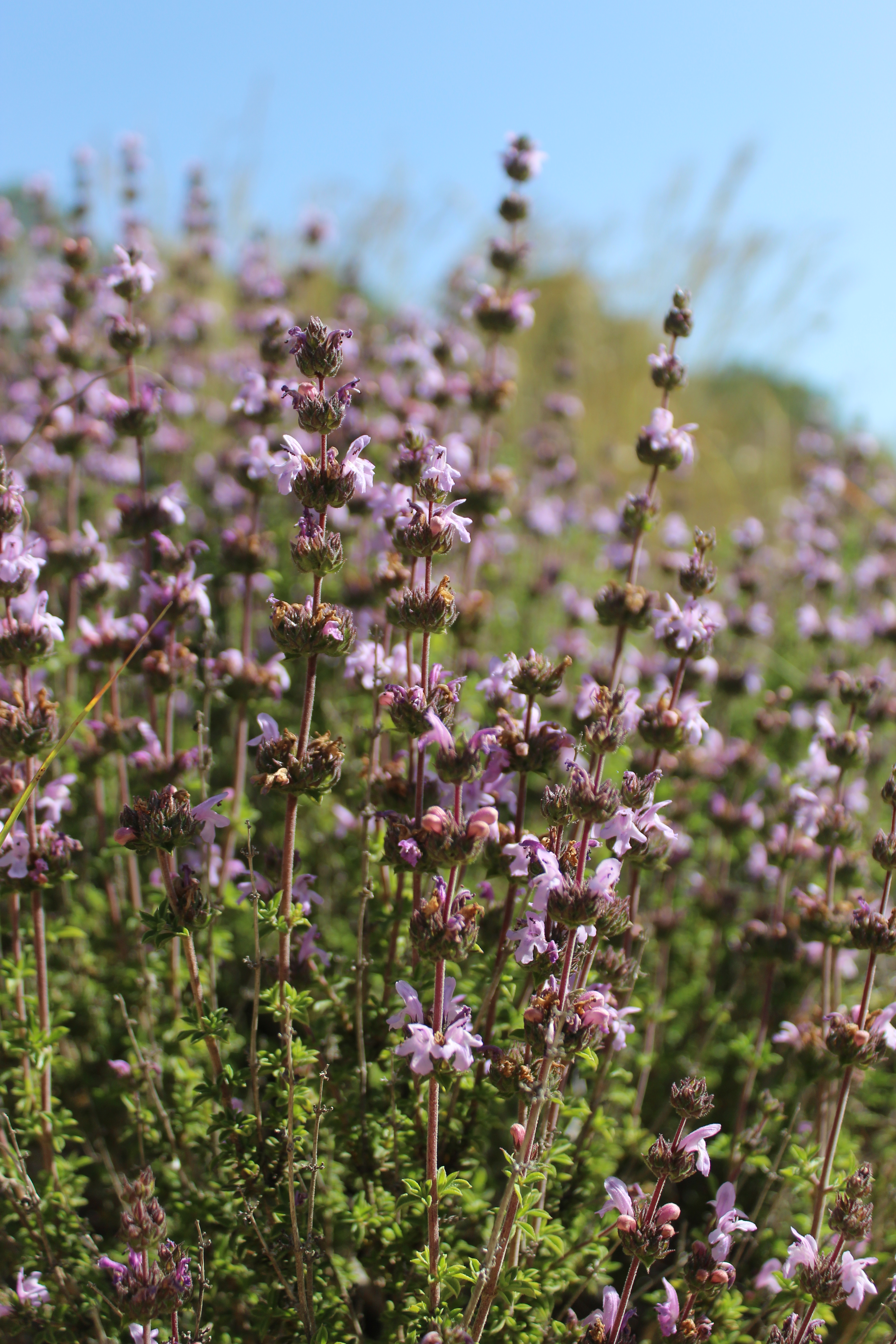

Scientific classification
- Kingdom: Plantae
- Clade: Tracheophytes
- Clade: Angiosperms
- Clade: Eudicots
- Clade: Asterids
- Order: Lamiales
- Family: Lamiaceae
- Genus: Satureja
- Species: S. thymbra

Binomial name
- Satureja thymbra L.

Synonyms
- Clinopodium thymbra (L.) (Kuntze); Micromeria thymbra (L.) (Kostel.); Satureja biroi (Jáv.); Satureja collina (Salisb.); Satureja hispida (Ehrh.); Satureja thymbra var. calvescens (Pamp.); Satureja tragoriganum (L.) (Tausch); Thymbra hirsuta (Pers.); Thymbra hirsutissima (Vent. ex Pers.); Thymus hirsutissimus (Poir.); Thymus tragoriganum L.

= Satureja thymbra =

Species of plant

Satureja thymbra, commonly known as savory of Crete, whorled savory, pink savory, and Roman hyssop (Arabic: za'atar rumi; za'atar franji), is a perennial-evergreen dwarf shrub of the family Lamiaceae. It is noted for its dark-green leaves, which grow on numerous, closely compacted branches, reaching a height of 20–50 centimetres (8–19 1/2 in). Pink to purple flowers blossom between March and June. It is native to southeastern Europe, Western Asia and Libya.

== Description ==
The plant has a fuscous-brown bark, with many erect young shoots, somewhat tetragonal, gland-dotted and pubescent with short downy white hairs. The leaves have numerous glandular trichomes of two morphologically distinct types: glandular hairs and glandular scales. The leaves are opposite, entire, smooth, and sessile; they generally extending in condensed clusters of inflorescence, consisting of a pair of sessile cymes arranged around an axis and equally spaced, with numerous lanceolate bracts measuring about 5 millimetres (1/4 in) long and 2 mm wide. The pink to purple flowers grow in whorls. Its fruit pods are schizocarps. The plant is aromatic.

=== Chemical composition ===
An analysis of the plant's chemical composition reveals that the Satureja thymbra, of the kind grown in Israel, contains a very high content of the chemicals γ-terpinene (15.9%), and p-cymene (12.4%), with the highest concentration being that of carvacrol (55.2%). Other independent studies revealed the main compounds of the essential oil ranging at varying levels; carvacrol (34.6%), γ-terpinene (22.9%), p-cymene (13.0%) and thymol (12.8%). Air dried aerial parts from S. thymbra collected in Lebanon and which were submitted to steam distillation using a Clevenger-type apparatus to produce the essential oil were also tested. The extracted oil was dried using anhydrous magnesium sulfate and stored at 4 °C. Analysis revealed that the Lebanese Satureja thymbra oil is characterized by high amounts of γ-terpinene (34.08%), carvacrol (23.07%) and thymol (18.82%).

The pesticidal property of the plant's volatile essential oil and other constituents were tested against an adult tick (Hyalomma marginatum), the result being that high concentrations of this oil resulted in the mortality of the tick.

== Distribution and habitat ==
The semi-shrub is native to Libya and southeastern Europe from Sardinia to Turkey; Crete, Cyprus, Lebanon, Israel (Palestine).

It grows mainly in Mediterranean woodlands and scrubland, adapting well to higher elevations, but also seen on rocky limestone gullies as an undergrowth, and alongside dirt roads. In Israel, the plant is commonly found in the Mount Carmel region, south of Haifa, as well as in the mountainous district of Upper Galilee, in Samaria and in the Judaean Mountains, thriving in areas where the soils are mainly terra rossa and hard limestone, but also in chalk. The plant is rarely found along the coastal plains, or in the Jordan Valley.

== Uses ==
The crushed leaves of this plant have more of a pungent taste and smell than the true hyssop (eizov), for which reason it is not commonly used today as a spice, except in Lebanon, where it is still used as a herbal tea in Lebanese traditional medicine. In ancient times, whorled savory was used as a spice in Anatolia and Greece. In Mishnaic times, the whorled savory was called sī'ah in Hebrew, (Note: According to Israeli author, Nissim Krispil, both Satureja thymbra and Thymbra spicata were called in Hebrew sī'ah. Late Spanish Jewish authorities, such as Rabbi Solomon Sirilio (1485–1554), thought that si'ah meant in Spanish poleo, which is pennyroyal (Mentha pulegium)) and is often mentioned in rabbinic literature along with eizov (marjoram) and qurnit (white-leaved savory), three herbal plants that grew naturally in the wild and were harvested either for firewood or for human consumption. In ancient times in Israel (Palestine), water in which whorled savory had been steeped was used to flavor meats that had been skewered and placed over hot coals for roasting. Dioscorides, in the Third Book of his De Materia Medica (3:44–45), alludes to the plant, saying that it was used to flavor meat, and brings down other medicinal uses in his day.

Its medicinal use, when concocted into a tea, is said to aid against digestive problems, diarrhea, colic pains, flatulence, intestinal cramps and anorexia. In Israel, the plant has protected status, making it a criminal offence to harvest it. In spite of these laws, the leaves of the plant are foraged by the local population between March and May.

In Ottoman Palestine, the flower's pollen was harvested by honey bees in the production of honey.

== In culture ==
In ceremonial usage, although it is related to the biblical hyssop, it was considered a different species, thus invalid to be brought in the purification ritual where true hyssop (eizov) was used in the preparation of the sprinkling water to purify those defiled by corpse uncleanness.

== See also ==
- Thymus capitatus (syn. Coridothymus capitatus)
