= Leo Haber =

American writer based in New York

Leo Haber (1927-2016) was an American writer based in New York.

Haber was born in Manhattan and studied at City College of New York. He was adjunct professor of Hebrew language at Hebrew Union College, New York.

His novel The Red Heifer was published by Syracuse University Press in 2001. The Red Heifer has been called "a notable contribution to the genre [of Jewish bildungsroman], adding a creative twist omitted by most of [its] predecessors, namely exploring the specific relationship between certain revered biblical stories and New York City." In his review in Haaretz, Curt Leviant wrote, "With Leo Haber's poignant, page-turning new novel, 'The Red Heifer,' we may very well have the 'Call It Sleep' of the 21st century... 'The Red Heifer' is a slice of America in a discrete time zone, an entire miniature civilization limned with compassion, perception and wit." Haber's short stories, poetry and criticism appeared in numerous journals, newspapers and magazines.. He was editor of Midstream magazine.

His son Howard E. Haber is a Distinguished Professor of Physics at University of California, Santa Cruz, and his son Edward Haber is a radio and music producer who has worked for WBAI and WNYC.
