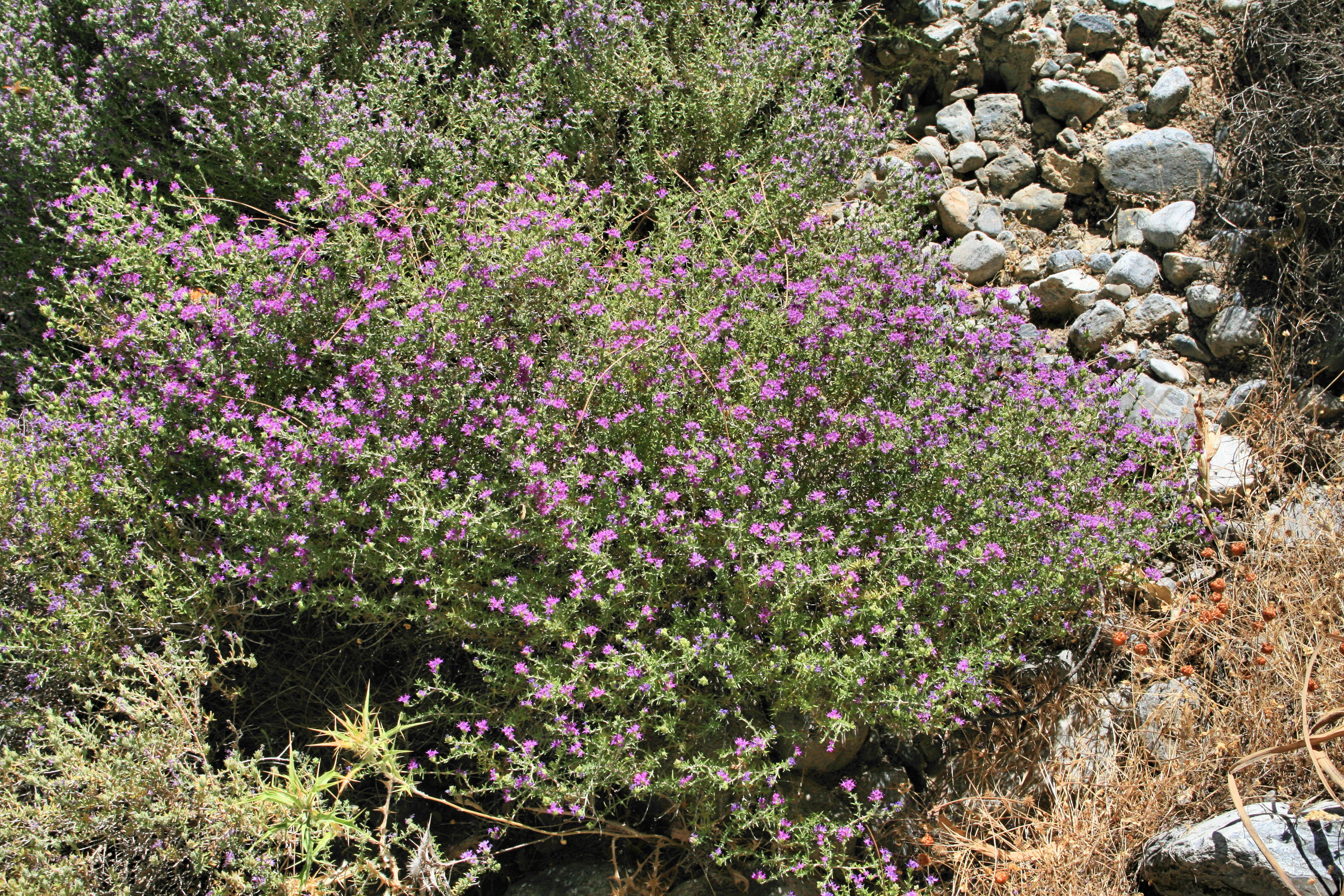

Scientific classification
- Kingdom: Plantae
- Clade: Tracheophytes
- Clade: Angiosperms
- Clade: Eudicots
- Clade: Asterids
- Order: Lamiales
- Family: Lamiaceae
- Genus: Thymus
- Species: T. capitatus

Binomial name
- Thymus capitatus (L.) Hoffmanns. & Link

Synonyms
- Coridothymus capitatus (L.) Rchb.f. Solms; Satureja capitata (L.) Cav.; Thymbra capitata (L.) Cav.

= Thymus capitatus =

Species of flowering plant

Thymus capitatus is a compact, woody perennial native to Mediterranean Europe and Turkey, more commonly known as conehead thyme, Persian-hyssop and Spanish oregano. It is also known under the name Thymbra capitata.

== Description ==
The plant has rising stems and narrow, fleshy, oil-gland-dotted green leaves that reach a length of 12 mm (0.47 in).

The pink, 10 mm (0.39 in)-long flowers are held in cone-shaped clusters at the ends of their stems in mid to late summer; they are protected by overlapping, 6 mm (0.24 in)-long, red-tinged bracts, edged in tiny hairs.

In Eurasia, a species of leafless parasitic dodder (Cuscuta epithymum) would often attach itself to the conehead thyme (Thymus capitatus), taking on the plant's pungency and from whence it also derived its host's Arabic name, al-ṣaʿitrah.

Thymus capitatus is hardy from USDA Zones 7–10. In Israel and Malta, the plant Thymus capitatus has protected status, making it a criminal offence to harvest it.

== See also ==
- Satureja thymbra
