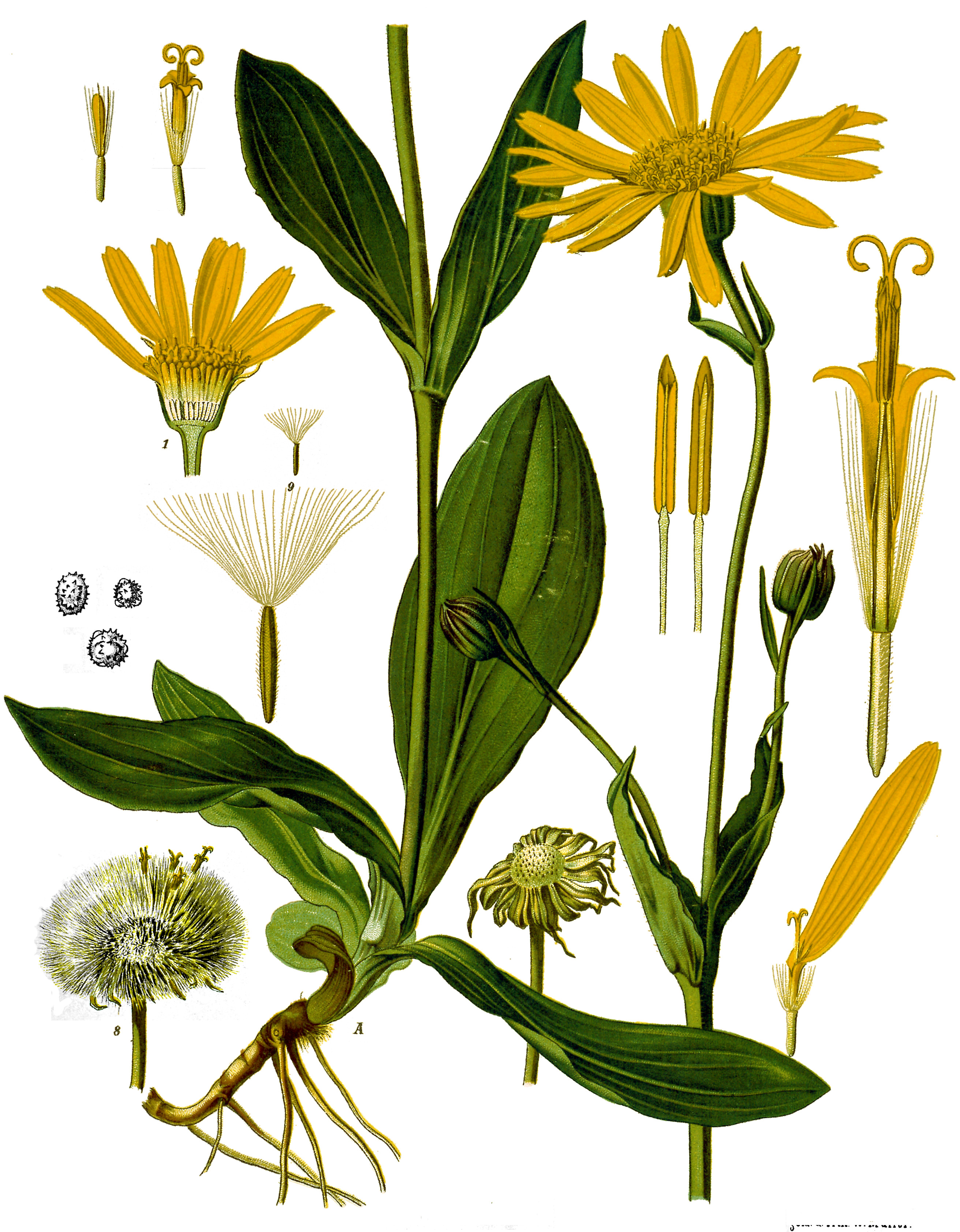
- 1897 illustration

Conservation status
- Least Concern (IUCN 3.1)

Scientific classification
- Kingdom: Plantae
- Clade: Embryophytes
- Clade: Tracheophytes
- Clade: Spermatophytes
- Clade: Angiosperms
- Clade: Eudicots
- Clade: Asterids
- Order: Asterales
- Family: Asteraceae
- Genus: Arnica
- Species: A. montana

Binomial name
- Arnica montana L.

Synonyms
- Doronicum montanum Lam.; Doronicum oppositifolium Lam.; Arnica helvetica Loudon; Arnica petiolata Schur; Arnica plantaginifolia Gilib.; Arnica lowii Holm; Cineraria cernua Thore

= Arnica montana =

Species of European flowering plant

Arnica montana, also known as leopard's bane, mountain tobacco and mountain arnica, is a moderately toxic European flowering plant in the daisy family Asteraceae that has a large yellow flower head. The names "wolf's bane" and "leopard's bane" are also used for another plant, Aconitum, which is extremely poisonous.

Arnica montana has been used as a herbal medicine, but there is insufficient clinical evidence for its therapeutic use. It is toxic when taken internally or applied to injured skin.

== Description ==
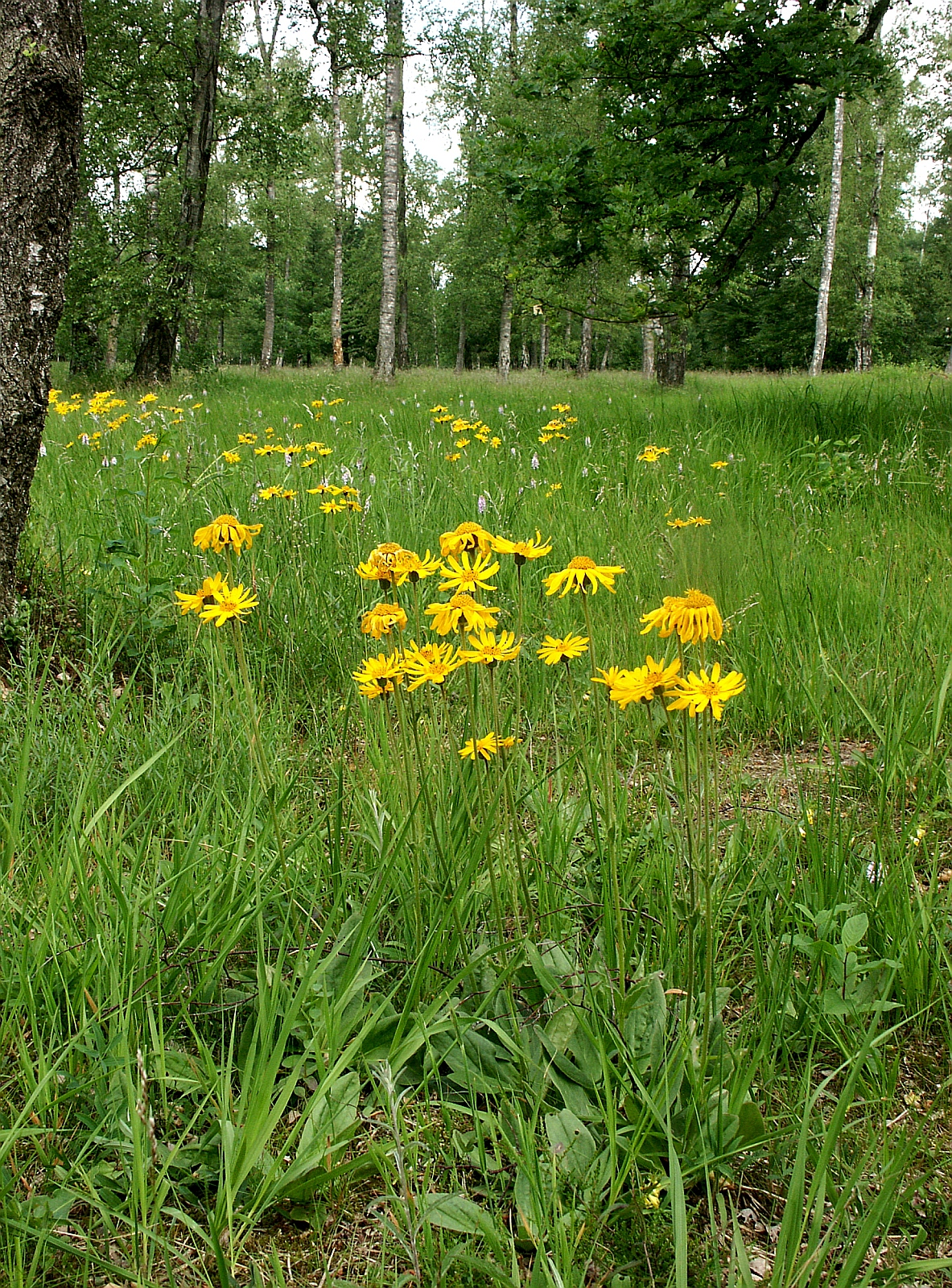
Arnica montana

Arnica montana is a flowering plant about 18–60 cm (7.1–23.6 in) tall aromatic fragrant, herbaceous perennial. Its basal green ovate leaves with rounded tips are bright coloured and level to the ground. In addition, they are somewhat downy on their upper surface, veined and aggregated in rosettes. By contrast, the upper leaves are opposed, spear-shaped and smaller which is an exception within the Asteraceae. The chromosome number is 2n=38.

The flowering season is between May and August (Central Europe). The 2 in (5.1 cm) flower heads are composed of orange-yellow disc florets in the centre which are externally bordered by 10 to 15 yellow ray florets. The achenes have a one-piece rough pappus which opens in dry conditions. Arnica montana is a hemicryptophyte, which helps the plant to survive the extreme overwintering condition of its habitat. In addition, Arnica forms rhizomes, which grow in a two-year cycle: the rosette part grows at its front while its tail is slowly dying.

== Taxonomy ==
Arnica montana was given its scientific name in 1753 by Carl Linnaeus. It is part of the genus Arnica which is classified in the family Asteraceae. The Latin specific epithet montana refers to mountains or coming from mountains. It has two accepted subspecies.

- Arnica montana subsp. atlantica
  Native to Portugal, Spain, and France.
- Arnica montana subsp. montana
  The more widespread subspecies, found in all parts of its range except for Portugal.

Arnica montana has 16 synonyms of the species or one of its subspecies.

Table of Synonyms
Name	Year	Rank	Synonym of:	Notes
Arnica alpina Willd. ex Steud.	1821	species	subsp. montana	= het., not validly publ.
Arnica alpina f. inundata Porsild	1926	form	subsp. montana	= het.
Arnica angustifolia Turcz. ex Ledeb.	1845	species	subsp. montana	= het., not validly publ.
Arnica helvetica G.Don	1830	species	subsp. montana	= het., not validly publ.
Arnica lowii Holm	1907	species	subsp. montana	= het.
Arnica montana var. alternifolia St.-Lag.	1889	variety	subsp. montana	= het.
Arnica montana var. angustifolia Duby	1828	variety	subsp. montana	= het.
Arnica montana var. atlantica (A.Bolòs) B.Bock	2012	variety	subsp. atlantica	≡ hom.
Arnica petiolata Schur	1866	species	subsp. montana	= het.
Arnica plantaginisfolia Gilib.	1782	species	subsp. montana	= het., not validly publ.
Cineraria cernua Thore	1803	species	subsp. montana	= het.
Doronicum arnica Garsault	1764	species	subsp. montana	= het., not validly publ.
Doronicum arnica Desf.	1804	species	subsp. montana	= het.
Doronicum montanum Lam.	1786	species	subsp. montana	= het.
Doronicum oppositifolium Lam.	1786	species	A. montana	≡ hom., nom. superfl.
Senecio arnica E.H.L.Krause	1905	species	subsp. montana	= het.
Notes: ≡ homotypic synonym; = heterotypic synonym

== Distribution and habitat ==
Distribution map of Arnica montana.

Arnica montana is widespread across most of Europe. It is absent from the Celtic Isles and the Italian and Balkan peninsulas. In addition, it is considered extinct in Hungary and Lithuania. Arnica montana grows in nutrient-poor siliceous meadows or clay soils. It mostly grows on alpine meadows and up to nearly 3,000 m (9,800 ft). In more upland regions, it may also be found on nutrient-poor moors and heaths. Arnica does not grow on lime soil, indicating its use as a bioindicator of nutrient poor and acidic soils. It is rare overall, but may be locally abundant. It is becoming rarer, particularly in the north of its distribution, largely due to increasingly intensive agriculture and commercial wildcrafting (foraging). Nevertheless, it is cultivated on a large scale in Estonia.

== Chemical constituents ==
Chemical structure of helenalin

The main constituents of Arnica montana are essential oils, fatty acids, thymol, pseudoguaianolide sesquiterpene lactones and flavanone glycosides. Pseudoguaianolide sesquiterpenes constitute 0.2–0.8% of the flower head of Arnica montana. They are the toxin helenalin and their fatty esters. 2,5-Dimethoxy-p-cymene and thymol methyl ether are the primary components of essential oils from both the plant's roots and rhizomes. The quality and chemical constitution of the plant substance Arnicae flos can be monitored by near-infrared spectroscopy.

== Cultivation ==
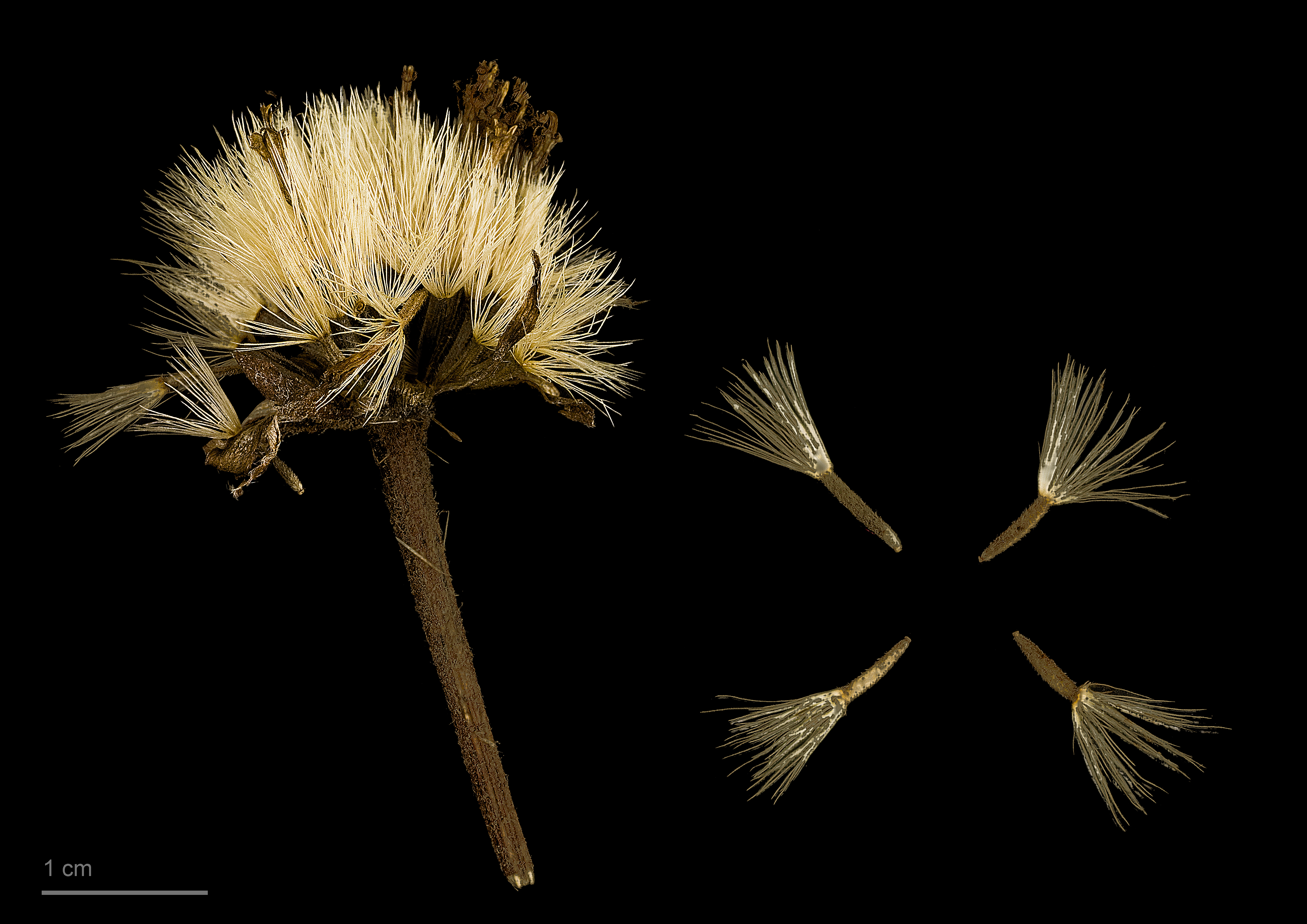
Arnica montana fruits and seeds

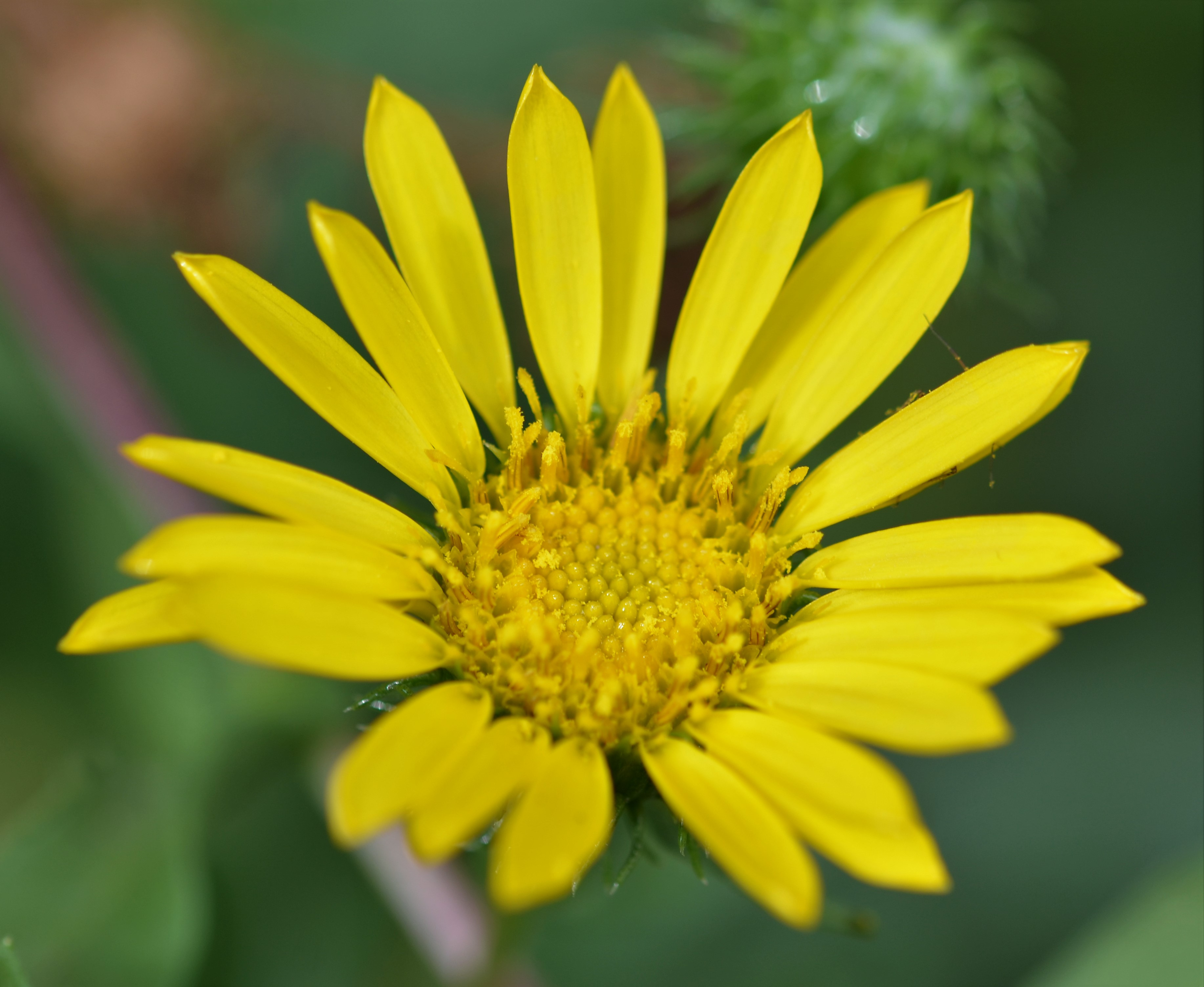
Arnica montana: Photo taken at Botanical Garden in Erlangen, Germany.

Arnica montana is propagated from seed. Generally, 20% of seeds do not germinate. For large scale planting, it is recommended to raise plants first in a nursery and then to transplant them in the field. Seeds sprout in 14–20 days but germination rate depends highly on the seed quality. Planting density for Arnica montana is of 20 plants/m^{2} such that the maximum yield density will be achieved in the second flowering season. While Arnica montana has high exigencies of soil quality, analyses should be done before any fertilizer input.

The flowers are harvested when fully developed and dried without their bract nor receptacles. The roots can be harvested in autumn and dried as well after being carefully washed.

Arnica montana is sometimes grown in herb gardens.

== Use in herbal medicine ==
Arnica montana has been used as a herbal medicine. When used as a topical medication in a gel at 50% concentration, A. montana was found to have the same effectiveness (albeit with possibly worse side effects) as a 5% ibuprofen gel for treating the symptoms of hand osteoarthritis. A 2014 review found that A. montana was ineffective at concentrations of 10% or less for pain, swelling, and bruises. A 1998 review of homeopathic A. montana (all such preparations are so dilute that they contain none of the plant) found it is no more effective than a placebo.

=== Toxicity ===
The US Food and Drug Administration has classified Arnica montana as an unsafe herb because of its toxicity. It should not be taken orally or applied to broken skin where absorption can occur. Arnica irritates mucous membranes and may elicit stomach pain, diarrhea, and vomiting. It may produce contact dermatitis when applied to skin.

Arnica montana contains the toxin helenalin, which can be poisonous if large amounts of the plant are eaten or small amounts of concentrated Arnica are used. Consumption of A. montana can produce severe gastroenteritis, internal bleeding of the digestive tract, raised liver enzymes (which can indicate inflammation of the liver), nervousness, accelerated heart rate, muscular weakness, and death if enough is ingested. Contact with the plant can also cause skin irritation. In the Ames test, an extract of A. montana was found to be mutagenic.

== Market ==
The demand for A. montana is 50 tonnes per year in Europe, but the supply does not cover the demand. The plant is rare; it is protected in Belgium, Croatia, France, Germany, Italy, Poland, and in some regions of Switzerland. France and Romania produce A. montana for the international market. Changes in agriculture in Europe during the last decades have led to a decline in the occurrence of A. montana. Extensive agriculture has been replaced by intensive management.
