= Methylumbelliferone =

Methylumbelliferone may refer to:

- 4-Methylumbelliferone (hymecromone)
- 7-O-Methylumbelliferone (herniarin)
