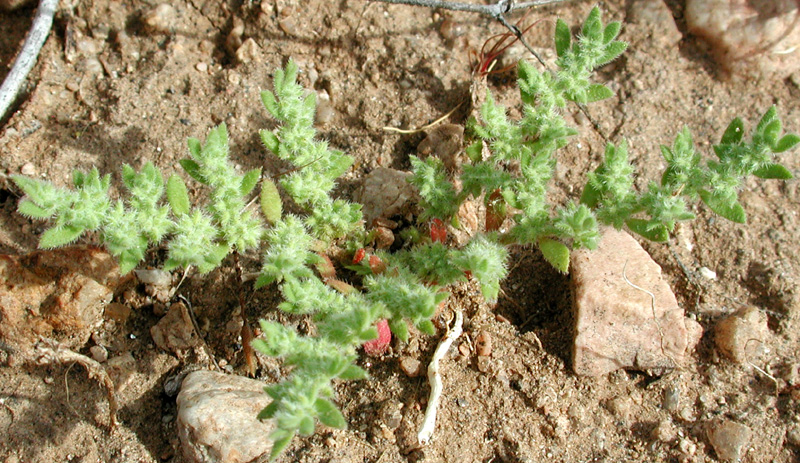
- The subsp. cinerea in the United States

Scientific classification
- Kingdom: Plantae
- Clade: Tracheophytes
- Clade: Angiosperms
- Clade: Eudicots
- Order: Caryophyllales
- Family: Caryophyllaceae
- Genus: Herniaria
- Species: H. hirsuta

Binomial name
- Herniaria hirsuta L.

= Herniaria hirsuta =

Species of flowering plant

Herniaria hirsuta is a species of flowering plant in the family Caryophyllaceae known by the common name hairy rupturewort. It is native to Eurasia and North Africa, and it is known on other continents, including North America, as an introduced species. This is an annual herb with stems up to 20 cm (8 in) long usually growing prostrate along the ground. The small, fuzzy, pale green leaves are up to about a centimeter long and coat the stems. The inflorescences appear in the leaf axils. Each contains three to eight hairy green sepals and no petals. The fruit is a tiny bumpy utricle containing one seed.

This plant is used in Morocco as an herbal remedy for kidney stones.
