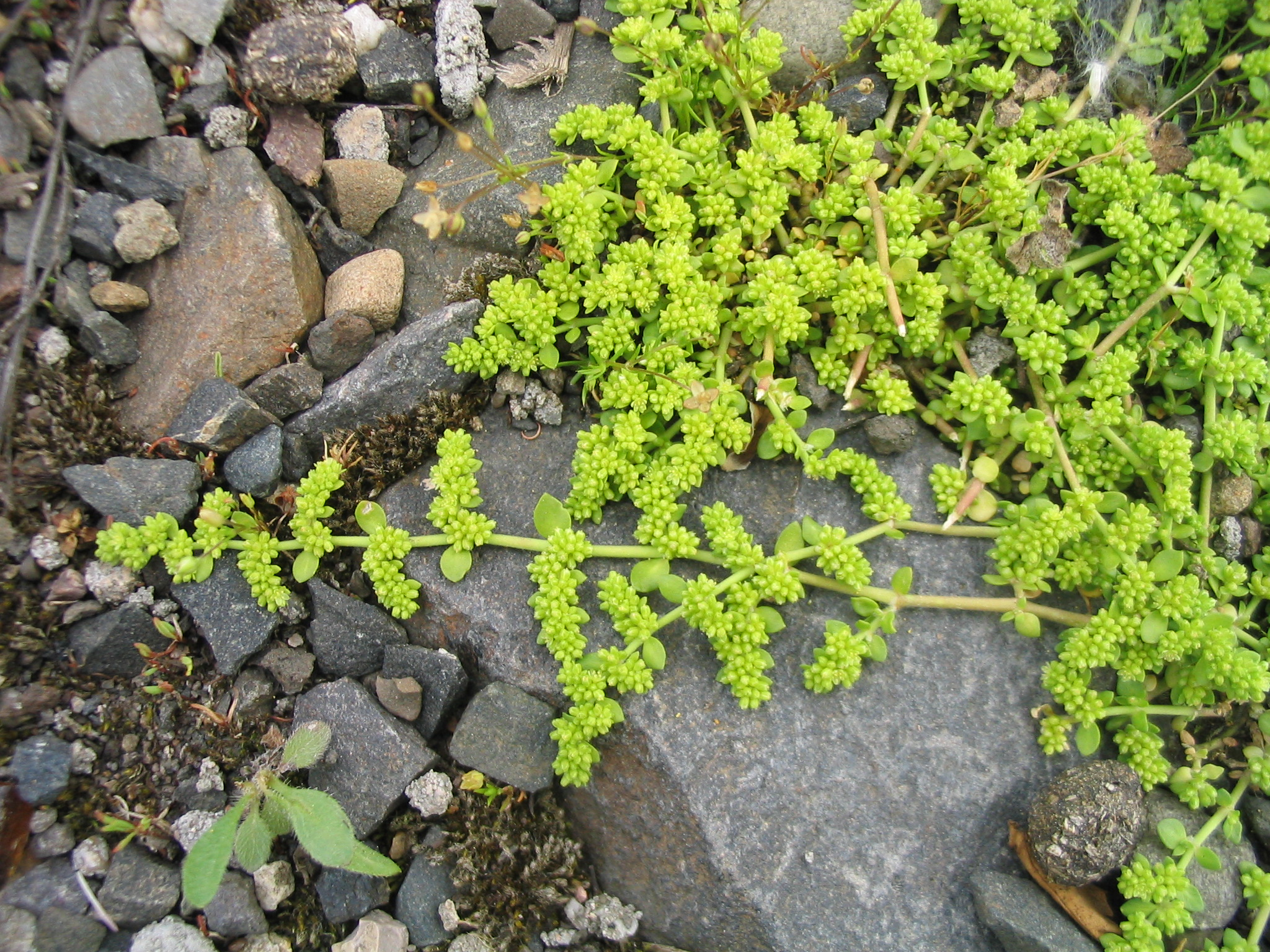
- Herniaria glabra

Scientific classification
- Kingdom: Plantae
- Clade: Tracheophytes
- Clade: Angiosperms
- Clade: Eudicots
- Order: Caryophyllales
- Family: Caryophyllaceae
- Genus: Herniaria; L.

Species
- 20-45, see text

= Herniaria =

Genus of flowering plants

Herniaria is a genus of flowering plants in the family Caryophyllaceae known generally as ruptureworts. They are native to Eurasia and Africa but several species have been widely introduced to other continents. These are flat, mat-forming annual herbs. The genus gets its scientific and common names from the once-held belief that species could be used as an herbal remedy for hernias.

== Selected species ==
- Herniaria algarvica
- Herniaria cachemiriana
- Herniaria capensis
- Herniaria caucasica
- Herniaria ciliolata
- Herniaria cinerea
- Herniaria glabra
- Herniaria hirsuta
- Herniaria lusitanica
  - Herniaria lusitanica subsp. berlengiana
- Herniaria maritima
- Herniaria kotovii
- Herniaria parnassica
- Herniaria polygama
- Herniaria pujosii
- Herniaria setigera
- Herniaria suavis
