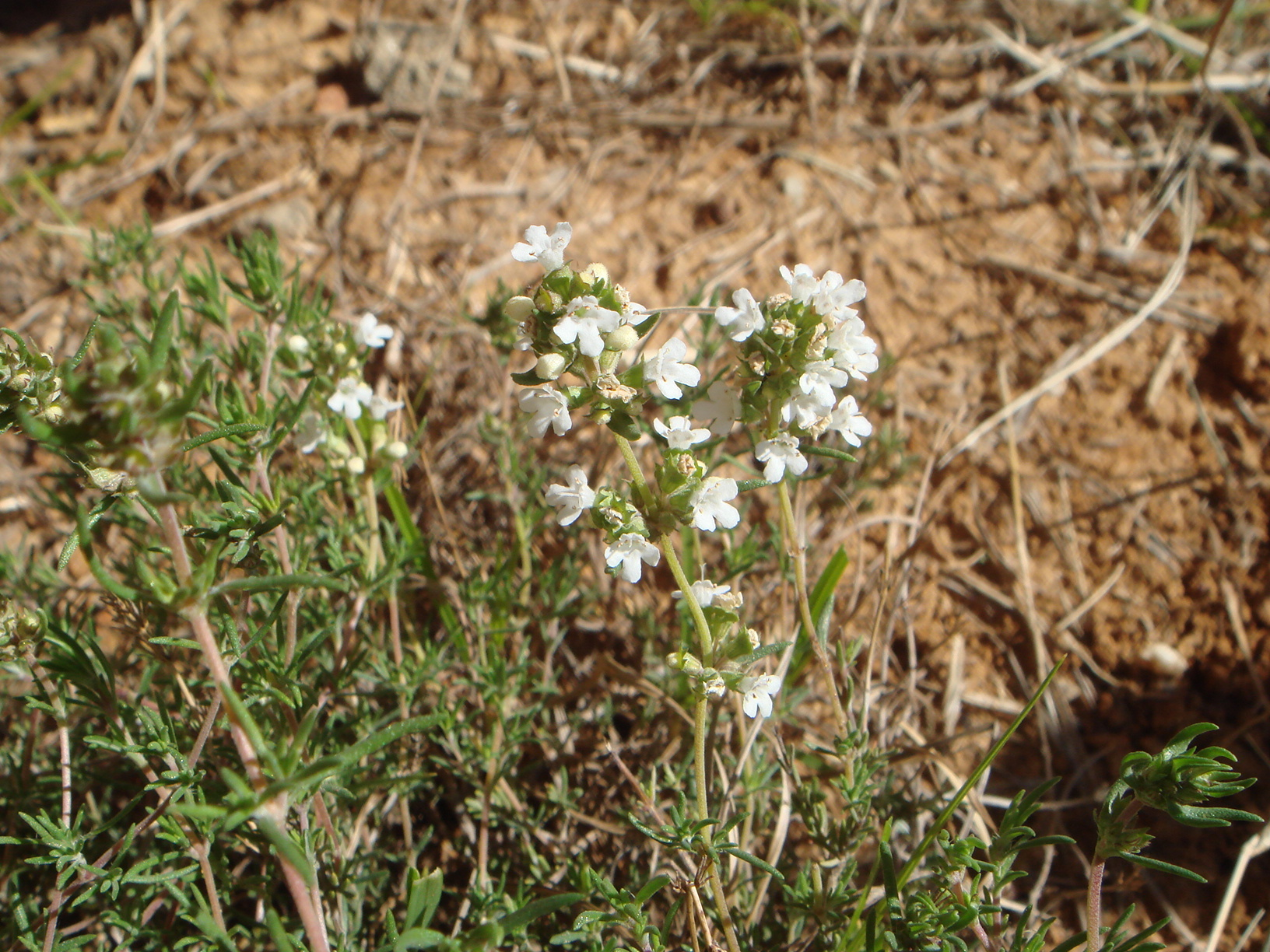

Conservation status
- Least Concern (IUCN 3.1)

Scientific classification
- Kingdom: Plantae
- Clade: Tracheophytes
- Clade: Angiosperms
- Clade: Eudicots
- Clade: Asterids
- Order: Lamiales
- Family: Lamiaceae
- Genus: Thymus
- Species: T. zygis

Binomial name
- Thymus zygis Loefl. ex L.

Subspecies
- Thymus zygis subsp. gracilis (Boiss.) R.Morales; Thymus zygis subsp. zygis; Thymus zygis subsp. sylvestris (Hoffmanns. et Link) Brot. ex Cout.

= Thymus zygis =

Species of flowering plant

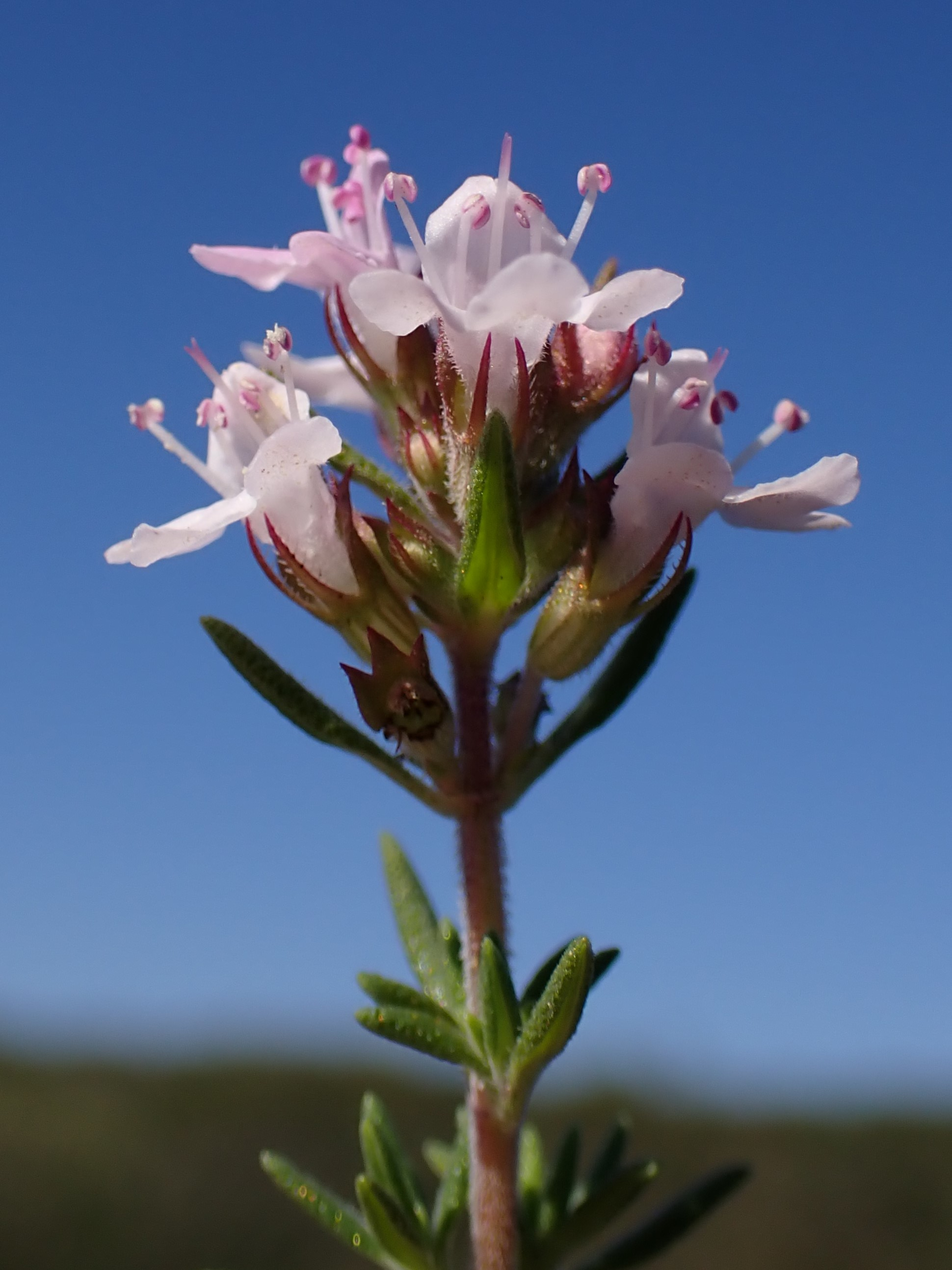
Flowers of Thymus zygis

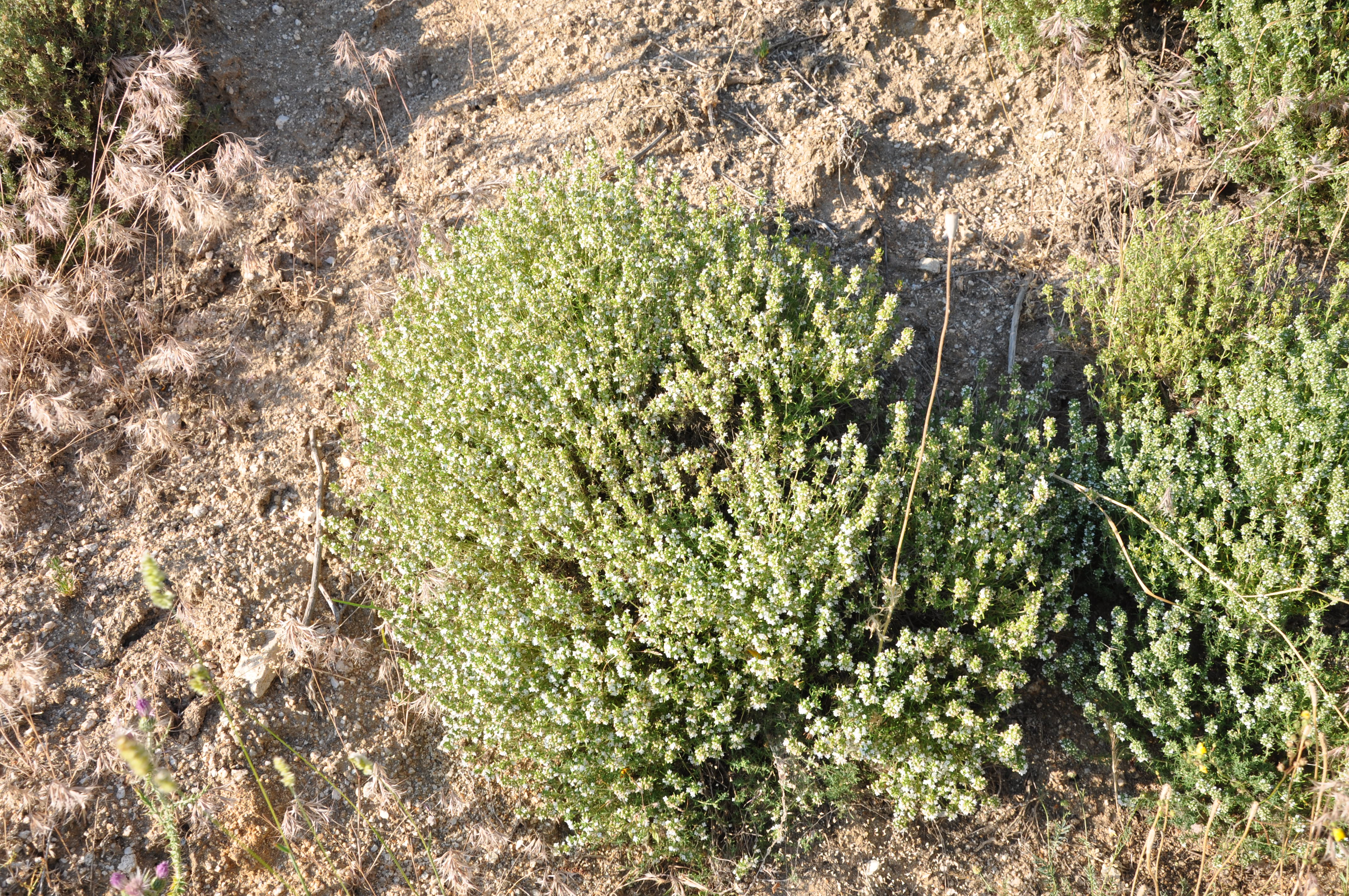
Thymus zygis in sandy soil

Thymus zygis is a type of flowering plant in the family Lamiaceae native to the Iberian Peninsula and northern Morocco.

== Description ==
Its leaves are thin and about 8 mm in length. It has white flowers. Sandy and loamy soils are ideal for this species and it is tolerant of nutrient poor soil. It can tolerate acidic to alkaline soil conditions.

== Distribution ==
It is very common in the southern half of Spain, Portugal and in Morocco.

== Biology ==
It is diploid but the chromosome number has been found to vary among the species. The size of the chromosomes are typically between 1 and 2 μm.

Thymus zygis is a gynodioecious species. As a result, there is a wide range of female frequency (17 – 87%) and a female frequency mean of 51%.

This species is able to hybridize with other species of the genus Thymus when there is overlapping flowering periods.

== Subspecies ==
=== T. zygis ssp. gracilis ===
This subspecies is diploid with a chromosome number of 28 (2n = 28).

This subspecies has a greater distribution than the other two subspecies. It has a more erect growth habit than subspecies sylvestris.

=== T. zygis ssp. sylvestris ===
This subspecies is diploid with a chromosome number of 56 or 58 (2n = 56, 58).

This subspecies does not grow near the coast. It is found in cold and wet environments which differs from the other two species. It has a denser indumentum when compared with the subspecies zygis.

=== T. zygis ssp. zygis ===
This subspecies is diploid with a chromosome number of 28 (2n = 28).

== Food ==
Thymus zygis is used as a food source. It is used as a dried and fresh herb collected from the wild in Spain and Portugal. It is also a popular herb to cultivate and hybridize with other Thymus species due to its diverse aromatics. However, Thymus vulgaris is more commonly used as herb than this species.

== Essential oils ==
Thymus zygis is mostly used for the production of essential oils and is the main species used for thyme oil. Due to the high abundance of this species in the Iberian Peninsula, Spain is the dominant country producing essential oil from this species. There are three major regions in Spain that produce thyme oil: Almería, Murcia, and Albacete. In 1989, the production of Thymus zygis essential oil was 25 tons. From 1990 to 1998, there was between 35 and 45 tons of essential oil produced annually. There is a growing demand for essential oils so it is likely that the production is greater nowadays. Harvesting the plant during its flowering stage yields the highest amount of essential oil and the lowest yield of essential oil was during its dormancy period. The compound composition varies at different stages of the vegetative cycle. The essential oils of this species are store in the glandular peltate trichome. The main compounds of interest in essential oils are thymol, carvacrol, linalool, and p-cymene. The concentration of each compound may be different depending on what plant the essential oil is harvested from. This difference is due to the variety of chemotypes existing for this species. There are multiple chemotypes for each of the subspecies.

Subspecies gracilis has two major chemotypes: thymol chemotype (maximum 68.1% ) and linalool chemotype (maximum 82.3%). The essential oils produced from each respective chemotype are effective in vitro against some gram-negative and gram-positive strains. Depending on the concentration the essential oils can be bacteriostatic or bactericidal. The findings from this study suggest that the essential oils can be used as natural preservatives to prevent bacterial growth and increase shelf life of certain food items.

Subspecies sylvestris has four major chemotypes: linalool chemotype (maximum 30.0%), carvacrol chemotype (maximum 25.0%), thymol chemotype (maximum 23.8%), and geranyl acetate/geraniol chemotype (maximum 20.8% and 19.8% respectively). The thymol chemotype is one of the most common chemotypes in Spain. All essential oils derived from each chemotype were shown to be effective against dermatophyte fungal strains with the carvacrol chemotype being the most effective in vitro. Additionally, there was not any cytotoxic effects shown on eukaryotic mammalian cells at concentrations that are effective against dermatophyte strains.

There are a variety of uses for thyme oil. It can be found in the production of perfumes and cosmetics, flavoring of chocolates, toothpaste, mouthwash, and cough medicine.

== Polyphenols ==
Thymus zygis contains flavonoids which is a group within polyphenols. Flavonoids have many functions in plants and in thyme studies have shown that they possess antioxidant properties which helps protect against free radicals.

Polyphenols found in the species and subspecies:

Thymus zygis

- Apigenin
- Cirsimaritin
- Luteolin
- 6-OH-Luteolin
- Xanthomicrol
- Vicenin-2

Thymus zygis ssp. sylvestris

- Cirsilineol
- 8-OMe-Cirsilineol
- Cirsimaritin
- 5-Desmethylnobiletin
- 5-Desmethylsinensetin
- Sideritoflavone
- Thymonin
- Thymusin
- Xanthomicrol

Thymus zygis ssp. zygis

- Cirsilineol
- 8-OMe-Cirsilineol
- Cirsimaritin
- 5-Desmethylnobiletin
- 5-Desmethylsinensetin
- Sideritoflavone
- Thymonin
- Thymusin
- Xanthomicrol

== Common names ==
Some English common names are Spanish thyme and white thyme. Since it is endemic to the Iberian Peninsula it has many common names that are not of English origin. Below is a list of non-English common names.

Common names:	ajedrea (Spanish, Castilian), ajedrea menuda (Spanish, Castilian), ajedrea menuda española (Spanish, Castilian), almaradux salsero (Spanish, Castilian), almoradux de la tierra (Spanish, Castilian), almoraduz (Spanish, Castilian), común (Spanish, Castilian), escarqueja (Spanish, Castilian), farigola salsera (Catalan), ferrigola (Catalan), herba tioira (Galician), herba tioirera (Galician), herba tioura (Galician), jenjerina (Spanish, Castilian), mejorana (Spanish, Castilian), morquera (Spanish, Castilian), ouregâo do mato (Portuguese), paticas de mona (Spanish, Castilian), poexo (Galician), ratero (Spanish, Castilian), rosmarinho (Portuguese), salserilla (Spanish, Castilian), salsero (Spanish, Castilian), salseta de pastó (Aragonese), sanjuanes (Spanish, Castilian), señorida de flor blanca (Majorcan), sensero (Spanish, Castilian), serpâo-do-monte (Portuguese), serpol de peñas (Spanish, Castilian), sinserino (Spanish, Castilian), thymo de España (Spanish, Castilian), timonet (Catalan), timonet (Valencian), tioira (Galician), tombillo (Spanish, Castilian), tomilhinha (Portuguese), tomilho (Portuguese), tomilho vulgar (Portuguese), tomilleja (Spanish, Castilian), tomillina (Spanish, Castilian), tomillo (Spanish, Castilian), tomillo aceitunero (Aragonese), tomillo aceitunero (Spanish, Castilian), tomillo aceytunero (Spanish, Castilian), tomillo albar (Spanish, Castilian), tomillo ancinoso (Spanish, Castilian), tomillo ansero (Spanish, Castilian), tomillo áspero (Spanish, Castilian), tomillo basto (Spanish, Castilian), tomillo blanco (Spanish, Castilian), tomillo borriquero (Spanish, Castilian), tomillo de aceitunas (Spanish, Castilian), tomillo de flor morada (Spanish, Castilian), tomillo de flor rojiza (Spanish, Castilian), tomillo de las aceitunas (Spanish, Castilian), tomillo de las fustas (Spanish, Castilian), tomillo de San Juan (Spanish, Castilian), tomillo del campo (Spanish, Castilian), tomillo español (Spanish, Castilian), tomillo fino (Spanish, Castilian), tomillo lagartijero (Spanish, Castilian), tomillo macho (Spanish, Castilian), tomillo negrillo (Spanish, Castilian), tomillo negro (Spanish, Castilian), tomillo oloroso (Spanish, Castilian), tomillo piojoso (Spanish, Castilian), tomillo rastrero (Spanish, Castilian), tomillo risquero (Spanish, Castilian), tomillo rojo (Spanish, Castilian), tomillo salao (Spanish, Castilian), tomillo salsero (Aragonese), tomillo salsero (High Aragonese), tomillo salsero (Spanish, Castilian), tomillo salsero de Toledo (Spanish, Castilian), tomillo sanjuanero (Spanish, Castilian), tomillo sansero (Spanish, Castilian), tomillo sansero fino (Spanish, Castilian), tomillo serrillo (Spanish, Castilian), tomillo tanarro (Spanish, Castilian), tomillo terrero (Spanish, Castilian), tomillo terrestre (Spanish, Castilian), tomillo zaucero (Spanish, Castilian), tomillo zorrero (Spanish, Castilian), tremonsillo (Catalan), tremonsillo (Valencian), tumillo (Spanish, Castilian)
