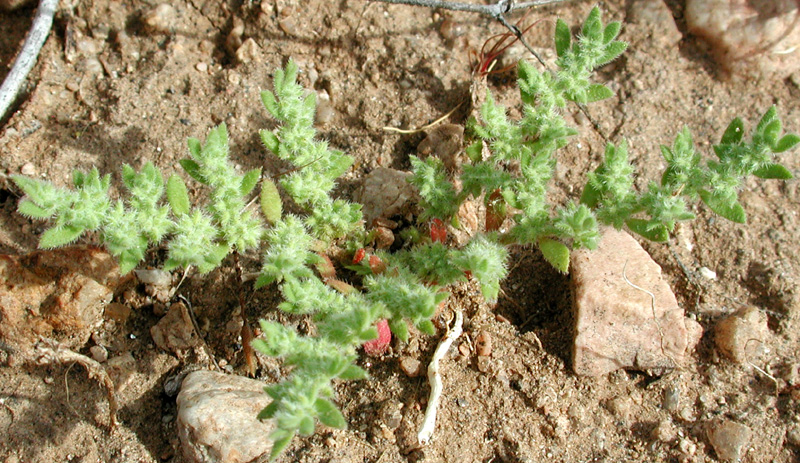

Scientific classification
- Kingdom: Plantae
- Clade: Tracheophytes
- Clade: Angiosperms
- Clade: Eudicots
- Order: Caryophyllales
- Family: Caryophyllaceae
- Genus: Herniaria
- Species: H. cinerea

Binomial name
- Herniaria cinerea DC.

Synonyms
- Herniaria hirsuta subsp. cinerea

= Herniaria cinerea =

Species of plant

Herniaria cinerea is a species of herb in the family Caryophyllaceae (carpetweeds).

== Sources ==
This article incorporates text from a free content work. Licensed under CC0 (license statement/permission). Text taken from Herniaria cinerea. Encyclopedia of Life.
