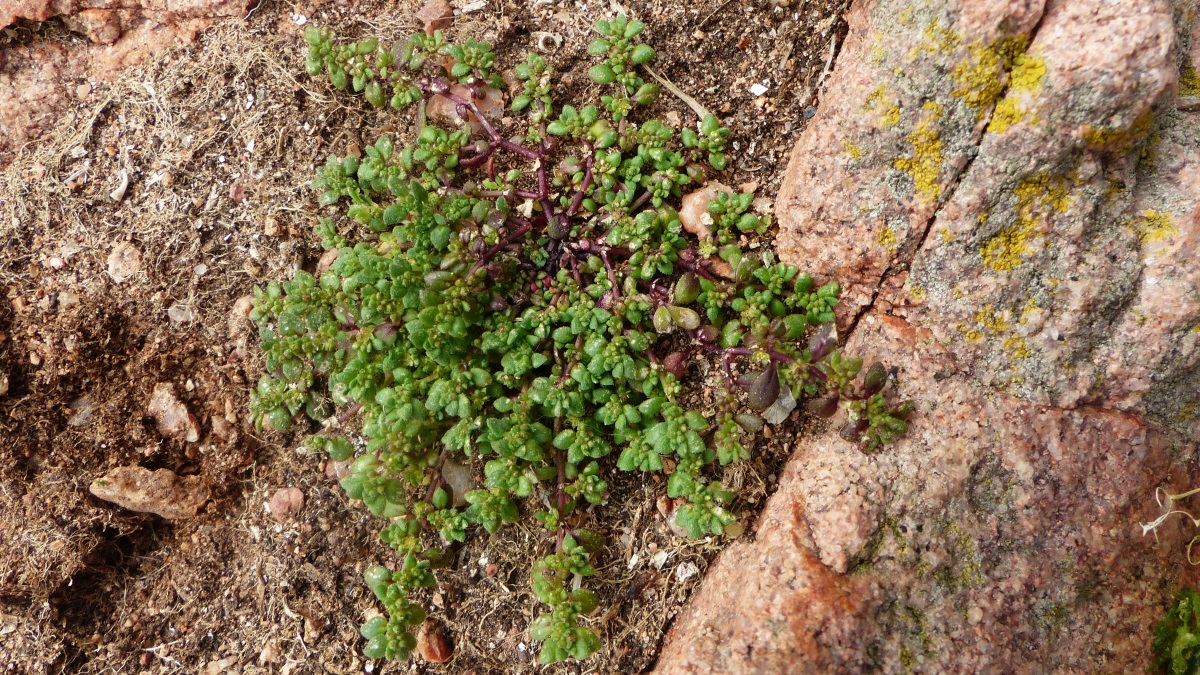
- Herniaria lusitanica subsp. berlengiana

Scientific classification
- Kingdom: Plantae
- Clade: Tracheophytes
- Clade: Angiosperms
- Clade: Eudicots
- Order: Caryophyllales
- Family: Caryophyllaceae
- Genus: Herniaria
- Species: H. lusitanica

Binomial name
- Herniaria lusitanica Chaudhri

= Herniaria lusitanica =

Species of plant

Herniaria lusitanica is a species of flowering plant in the family Caryophyllales. It is endemic to the Iberian Peninsula and the Berlengas archipelago.

== Description ==
Herniaria lusitanica is an annual (subsp. lusitanica), biannual or perennial (subsp. berlengiana) plant. It has very ramified stems, 9–3 mm (0.35–0.12 in) leaves and densely packed glomeruli with 4-15 flowers.

== Distribution and habitat ==
Herniaria lusitanica is native to the Iberian Peninsula and the Berlengas archipelago of Portugal. It grows in agricultural fields, pathways and altered land in dry places.

== Subspecies ==
It has two subspecies:

- H. lusitanica subsp. lusitanica: Native to the Iberian Peninsula.
- H. lusitanica subsp. berlengiana: Native to the Berlengas archipelago.
