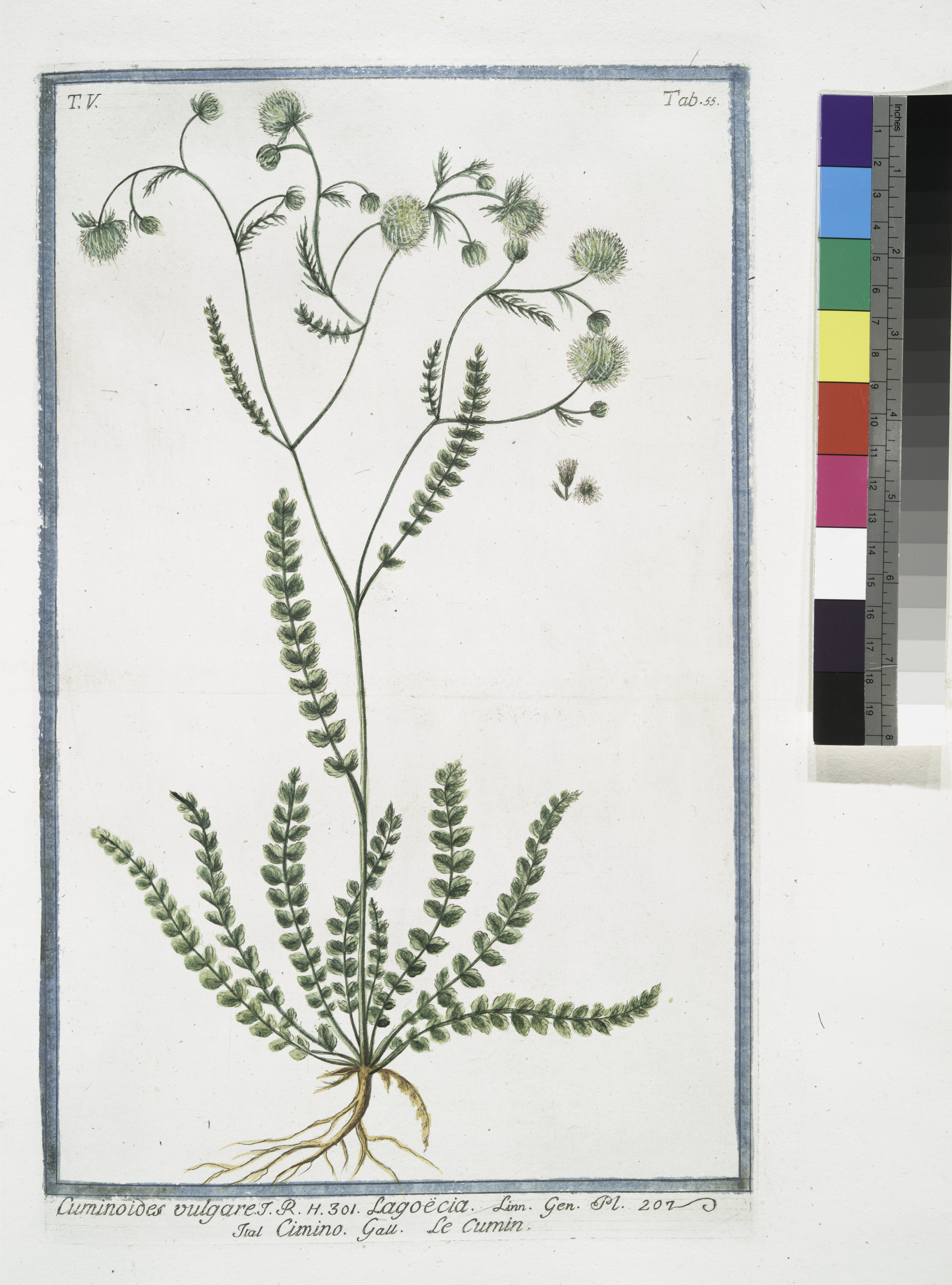
- Lagoecia cuminoides botanical illustration

Scientific classification
- Kingdom: Plantae
- Clade: Tracheophytes
- Clade: Angiosperms
- Clade: Eudicots
- Clade: Asterids
- Order: Apiales
- Family: Apiaceae
- Subfamily: Apioideae
- Tribe: Pyramidoptereae
- Genus: Lagoecia; L.
- Species: L. cuminoides

Binomial name
- Lagoecia cuminoides L.

Synonyms
- Chemnizia Heist. ex Fabr.; Cuminoides Fabr.

= Lagoecia =

Genus of Apiaceae plants

Lagoecia, wild cumin, is a genus of flowering plants in the family Apiaceae. It has only one species, Lagoecia cuminoides, native to the Mediterranean region and as far east as Iran. Its essential oil contains 72.83–94.76% thymol, quite a bit more than thyme (Thymus vulgaris), which has a thymol content of approximately 47.59%.
