= Herniaria maritima =

Conservation status
- Least Concern (IUCN 3.1)

Scientific classification
- Kingdom: Plantae
- Clade: Tracheophytes
- Clade: Angiosperms
- Clade: Eudicots
- Order: Caryophyllales
- Family: Caryophyllaceae
- Genus: Herniaria
- Species: H. maritima

Binomial name
- Herniaria maritima Link

Species of plant

Herniaria maritima is a species of flowering plant in the family Caryophyllaceae, endemic to coastal Portugal. It inhabits coastal dunes, mainly in clearings of creeping forests and Junipers in fixed dunes, on sandy, neutral or basic substrates.
