= Dithymoquinone =

Names
- IUPAC name 4b,8b-Dimethyl-3,7-di(propan-2-yl)-4a,8a-dihydrobiphenylene-1,4,5,8-tetrone

Identifiers
CAS Number	39461-20-6
3D model (JSmol)	Interactive image
ChemSpider	32779272
PubChem CID	398941
- InChI: InChI=1S/C20H24O4/c1-9(2)11-7-13(21)19(5)17(15(11)23)20(6)14(22)8-12(10(3)4)16(24)18(19)20/h7-10,17-18H,1-6H3 Key: FPRGRROJPRIHJP-UHFFFAOYSA-N
- SMILES: CC(C)C1=CC(=O)C2(C(C1=O)C3(C2C(=O)C(=CC3=O)C(C)C)C)C

Properties
Chemical formula	C_{20}H_{24}O_{4}
Molar mass	328.408 g·mol^{−1}
- Except where otherwise noted, data are given for materials in their standard state (at 25 °C [77 °F], 100 kPa). Infobox references

Dithymoquinone is a bioactive isolate of Nigella sativa. Chemically, it is a dimer of thymoquinone.
