= Thymoquinone =

Names
- Preferred IUPAC name 2-Methyl-5-(propan-2-yl)cyclohexa-2,5-diene-1,4-dione
- Other names Thymoquinone

Identifiers
CAS Number	490-91-5
3D model (JSmol)	Interactive image
ChEBI	CHEBI:113532
ChEMBL	ChEMBL1672002
ChemSpider	9861
ECHA InfoCard	100.007.020
PubChem CID	10281
UNII	O60IE26NUF
CompTox Dashboard (EPA)	DTXSID9060079
- InChI: InChI=1S/C10H12O2/c1-6(2)8-5-9(11)7(3)4-10(8)12/h4-6H,1-3H3 Key: KEQHJBNSCLWCAE-UHFFFAOYSA-N
- SMILES: CC1=CC(=O)C(=CC1=O)C(C)C

Properties
Chemical formula	C_{10}H_{12}O_{2}
Molar mass	164.204 g·mol^{−1}
- Except where otherwise noted, data are given for materials in their standard state (at 25 °C [77 °F], 100 kPa). verify (what is ?) Infobox references

Thymoquinone is a phytochemical compound found in the plant Nigella sativa. It is also found in select cultivated Monarda fistulosa plants, which can be steam distilled to produce an essential oil. Thymoquinone is also a major oxidation product of both thymol and its structural isomer, carvacrol.

It has been classified as a pan-assay interference compound, which binds indiscriminately to many proteins. It is under basic research to further identify its biological properties.

== See also ==
- Dithymoquinone, a dimer of thymoquinone
- 2,5-Dimethoxy-p-cymene
