= 2,5-Dimethoxy-p-cymene =

Names
- Preferred IUPAC name 1,4-Dimethoxy-2-methyl-5-(propan-2-yl)benzene
- Other names: Hydrothymoquinone dimethyl ether; Thymoquinol dimethyl ether; Thymohydroquinone dimethyl ether; 1,4-Dimethoxy-2-isopropyl-5-methylbenzene; 1,4-Dimethoxy-2-methyl-5-propan-2-ylbenzene; p-2,5-Dimethoxycymene

Identifiers
CAS Number	14753-08-3
3D model (JSmol)	Interactive image
ChEMBL	ChEMBL456933
ChemSpider	4932489
PubChem CID	6427071
UNII	2KH5WR9MND
CompTox Dashboard (EPA)	DTXSID20423797
- InChI: InChI=1S/C12H18O2/c1-8(2)10-7-11(13-4)9(3)6-12(10)14-5/h6-8H,1-5H3 Key: VTRMVHBUTNPBTP-UHFFFAOYSA-N
- SMILES: CC1=CC(=C(C=C1OC)C(C)C)OC

Properties
Chemical formula	C_{12}H_{18}O_{2}
Molar mass	194.274 g·mol^{−1}
- Except where otherwise noted, data are given for materials in their standard state (at 25 °C [77 °F], 100 kPa). Infobox references

2,5-Dimethoxy-p-cymene, or thymohydroquinone dimethyl ether, is a phytochemical found in the essential oils of plants within the family Asteraceae. These essential oils, which contain the compound as a major component of the oil, have antifungal, antibacterial, and insecticidal properties.

== Natural occurrence ==
2,5-Dimethoxy-p-cymene occurs in a variety of different plants' essential oils. Examples include:

- Ayapana triplinervis (92.8%)
- Apium leptophyllum (50.7 to 80.24%)
- Cyathocline purpurea (57.4%)
- Arnica montana (32.6%)
- Laggera crispata (32.2%)
- Blumea perrottetiana (30.0%)
- Eupatorium capillifolium (20.8%)
- Sphaeranthus indicus (18.2%)
- Limbarda crithmoides (16.4)
- Bubonium imbricatum (16.2%)

== Chemical synthesis ==
2,5-Dimethoxy-p-cymene can be synthesized from carvacrol by aromatic halogenation followed by nucleophilic substitution with sodium methoxide and Williamson ether synthesis using methyl iodide.

== See also ==
- Thymoquinone
