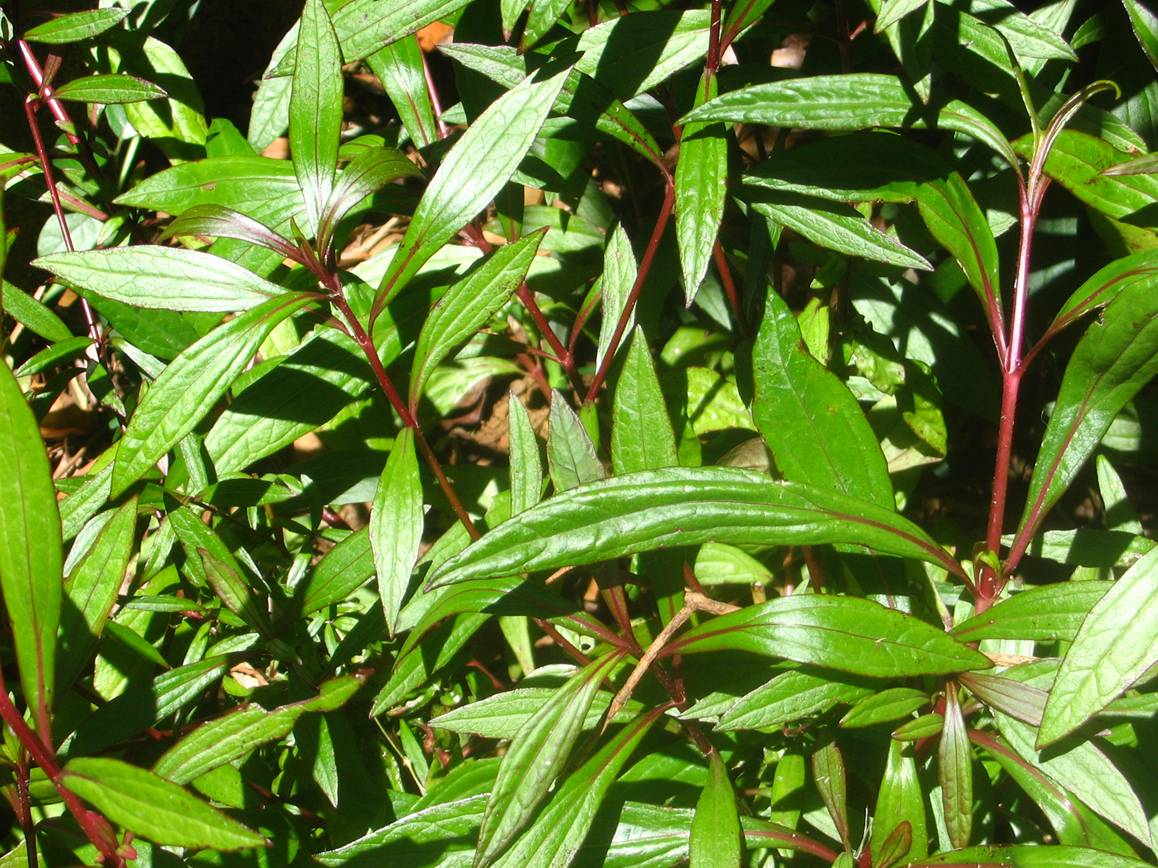

Scientific classification
- Kingdom: Plantae
- Clade: Tracheophytes
- Clade: Angiosperms
- Clade: Eudicots
- Clade: Asterids
- Order: Asterales
- Family: Asteraceae
- Genus: Ayapana
- Species: A. triplinervis

Binomial name
- Ayapana triplinervis (M.Vahl) R.M.King & H.Rob.

Synonyms
- Eupatorium ayapana Vent. Eupatorium triplinerve M.Vahl

= Ayapana triplinervis =

Species of flowering plant

Ayapana triplinervis (aya-pana, water hemp) is a tropical American shrub in the family Asteraceae. This plant has long slender leaves which are often used in traditional medicine. The flowers are pale pink and the thin, hairless stem is reddish in color.

== Description ==
Ayapana triplinervis is an ascending, slender perennial. Its leaves are purple, subsessile, lanceolate, 3-nerved, acuminate, subentire, and glabrous. Inflorescence is a lax, few-headed corymb, heads pedicellate, about 20-flowered. Flowers are slaty blue.

== Chemical constituents ==
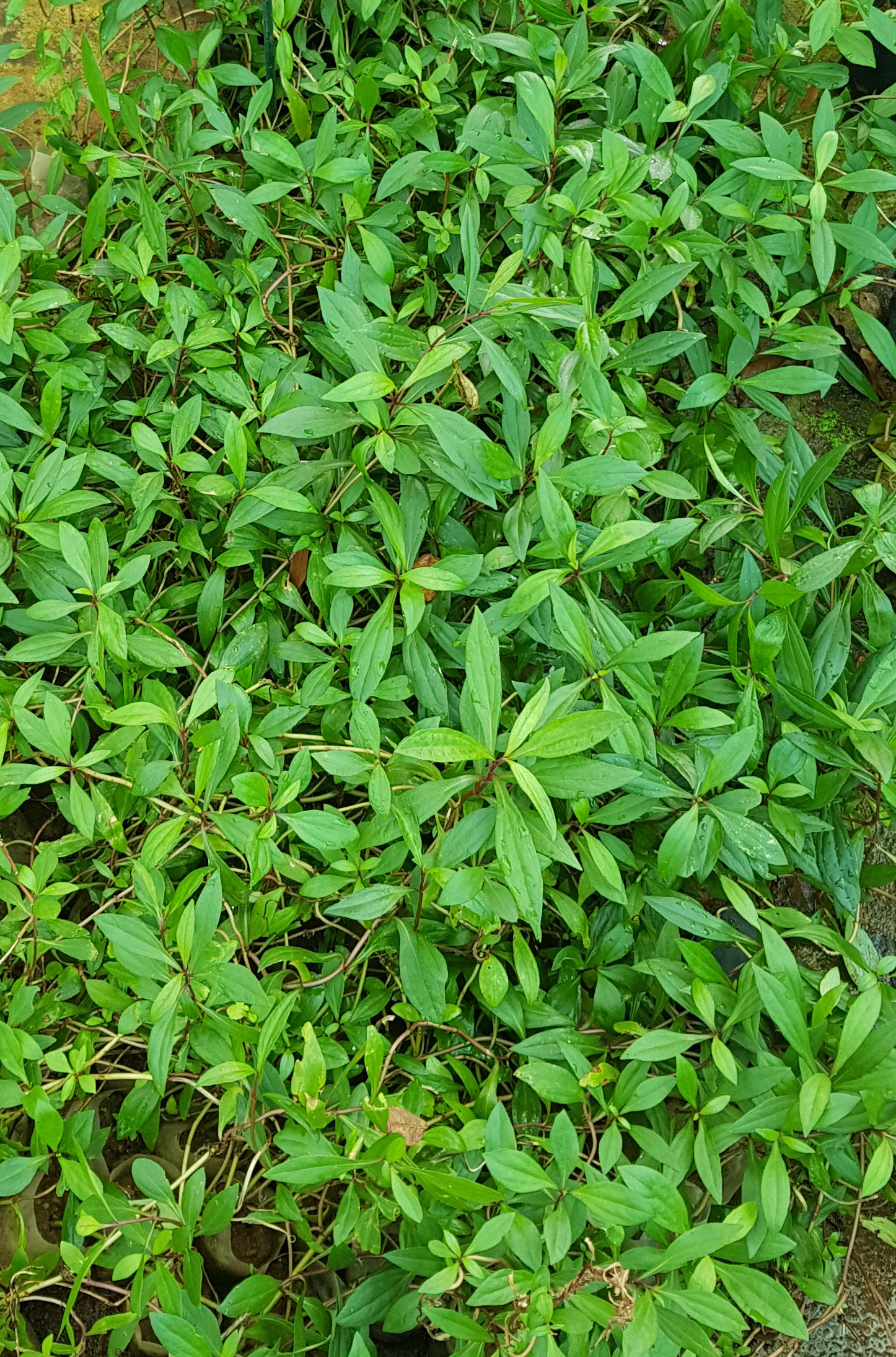
Ayapana triplinervis plantlings

Ayapana triplinervis is a source of several coumarin derivatives. The leaves contain a volatile essential oil, ayapana oil, 1.14%. This oil contains the coumarins ayapanin (herniarin) and ayapin, as well as other chemical compounds including stigmasterol, vitamin C, and carotene. The essential oil also contains thymohydroquinone dimethyl ether.

The plant yields cineol, α-phellandrene, alpha-terneol, ayapanin, ayapin, borneol, coumarin, sabinene, and umbelliferone, among many others.

Phytochemical analysis of a methanolic extract yielded hexadecanoic acid (14.65%), 2,6,10-trimethyl,14-ethylene-14-pentadecane (9.84%), 7-butyl-bicyclo[4.1.0]heptane (2.38%), 8-methyldecanoic acid methyl ester (3.86%), 1-undecanol (7.82%), 1-hexyl-1-nitrocyclohexane (2.09%), 1,14-tetradecanediol (6.78%), and 2-hydroxyoctadecanoic acid 1,3-propanediyl ester.
