= Herniaria algarvica =

Conservation status
- Vulnerable (IUCN 3.1)

Scientific classification
- Kingdom: Plantae
- Clade: Tracheophytes
- Clade: Angiosperms
- Clade: Eudicots
- Order: Caryophyllales
- Family: Caryophyllaceae
- Genus: Herniaria
- Species: H. algarvica

Binomial name
- Herniaria algarvica Chaudhri

Species of plant

Herniaria algarvica is a species of flowering plant in the family Caryophyllaceae, endemic to southwestern coastal Portugal. It inhabits clearings of scrub in maritime cliffs, rocks and coastal dunes.
