= Caspar Neumann (chemist) =

German chemist and apothecary

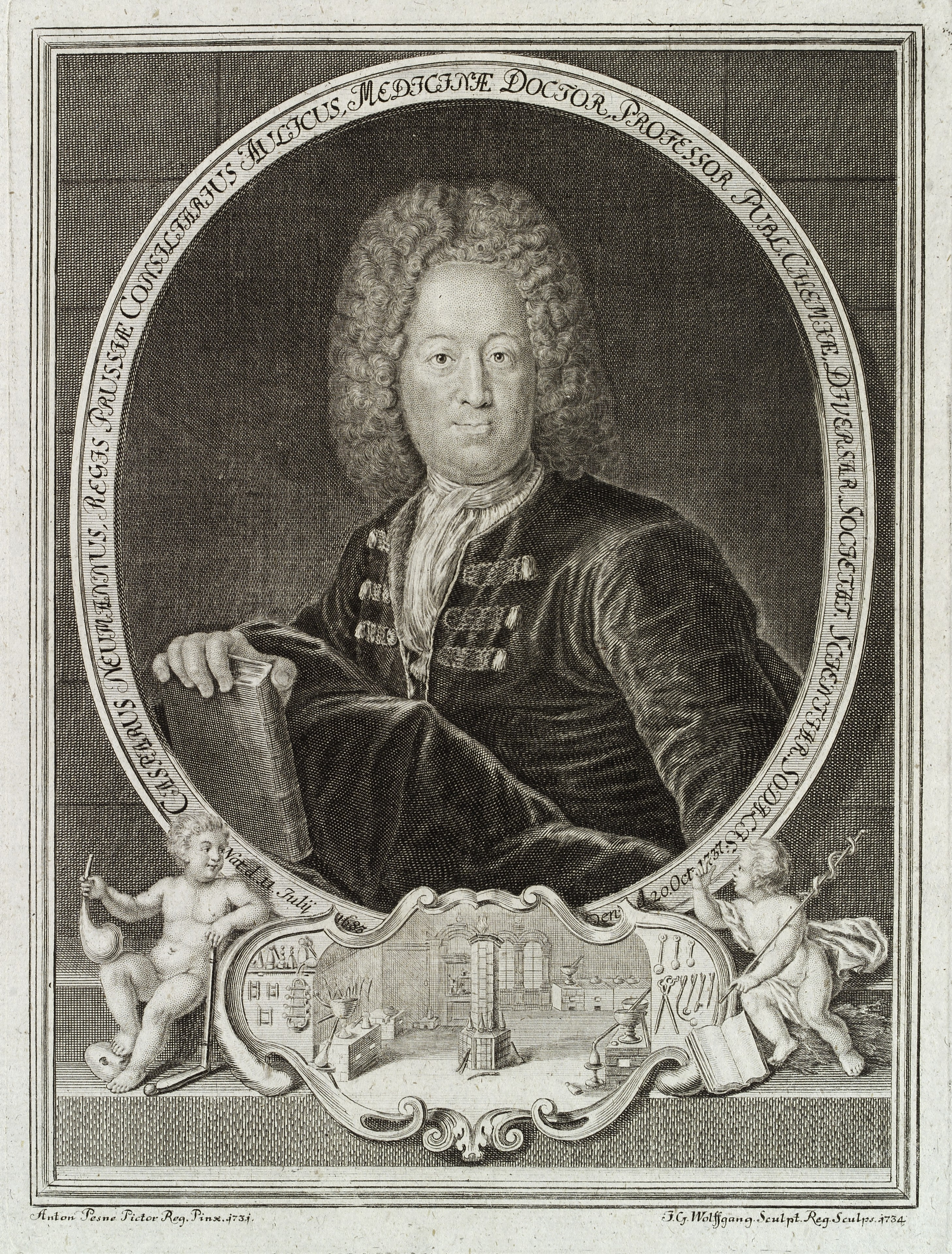
- Born: July 11, 1683; Zullichau, Electorate of Brandenburg, Holy Roman Empire
- Died: October 20, 1737 (aged 54); Berlin, Germany
- Occupations: Chemist and Apothecary
- Spouse: Cornelia Maria
- Children: Stepson: Johann Caspar Conradi
- Parent(s): Georg Neumann; Rosina Weichert

Caspar Neumann (or Neuman) (July 11, 1683 – October 20, 1737) was a German chemist and apothecary.

== Biography ==
=== Birth and Education ===
Neumann was born at Zullichau, in the Electorate of Brandenburg, July 11, 1683. He was first educated in music by his father, but being orphaned at age 12, he apprenticed to his godfather, the apothecary, Johannes Romke. Completing his apprenticeship in 1701, he commenced practice at Unruhstadt, or Kargowa, in Poland.

=== Career ===
After three years in Kargowa, he went to Berlin in 1704, working at first at the apothecary shop of Christoph Schmedicke. Soon thereafter he became a traveling apothecary for the king of Prussia, Frederick I, and he continued in this capacity until 1711. At that point, Frederik sent him abroad to learn more about chemistry and pharmacy in a number of European countries.

While in England, in 1713, he learned of the death of his royal patron and of the consequent termination of his patronage. For the next three years, he found work in London with a wealthy and renowned Dutch surgeon, Abraham Cyprianus, a Fellow of the Royal Society. At this time he became acquainted with several members of the Royal Society, including Isaac Newton and Hans Sloane.

In 1716 Neumann returned briefly to Germany in the entourage of George I. While there, he visited Berlin and made connections that ultimately resulted in his appointment as the Royal Court Apothecary after he completed his European travels in 1719. He held this post for the rest of his life. He was elected a Fellow of the Royal Society in 1726.

In 2009, Alexander Kraft established that it was Caspar Neumann who conveyed the secret formula for preparing the first synthetic pigment, Prussian blue, to the Royal Society in England in 1723.

== Known For ==
- Attempting to establish clear material descriptions of the properties of a substance, such as density and melting point.
- Organizing a nomenclature for salts
- Discovery of crystalline form of thymol
- Work on alcohol, amber, benzoin resin and cinnamic acid.
- Support for the phlogiston theory

== Bibliography ==
=== Works by Neumann ===
- Disquisitio De Ambra Grysea, Dresden, 1736.
- Praelectiones chemicae seu chemia medico-phamaceutica experimentalis & rationalise oder grünndlicher Unterricht der Chemie … Berlin, 1740.
- Chymiae medicae dogmatico-experimentalis… oder der gründlichen and mit Experimenten erwiesenen Medicinischen Chymie …, 4 vols. Züllichau, 1749–1755.
- The Chemical Works of Caspar Neumann, M. D. Trans. & ed. William Lewis. London, 1759. 2nd Ed. 1773: Vol. 1 ; Vol.2

==== Contributions to the Transactions of the Royal Society(London) ====
- Disquisitio de camphora.
- De experimento probandi spiritum vini Gallici, per quam usitato, sed revera falso et fallaci.

=== Secondary Sources ===
- Peter Berghaus u.a.: Der Arzt: Graphische Bildnisse des 16.–20. Jahrhunderts aus dem Porträtarchiv. Landschaftsverband-Lippe, Münster 1978, No. 85.
- Biographical Notice of Caspar Neuman: Philosophical Transactions of the Royal Society of London. London, 1809, Vol. 7, p. 93.
- Alexander Chalmers: General Biographical Dictionary. London, 1812, Vol. 23, p. 103.
- Alfred Exner: Der Hofapotheker Caspar Neumann (1683–1737). Ein Beitrag zur Geschichte des ersten pharmazeutischen Lehrers am Collegium Medico-Chirurgicum in Berlin.(A contribution to the history of the first pharmaceutical professor at the Berlin Collegium Medico-Chirurgicum.) Dissertation, University of Berlin, 1938.
- Fritz Ferchl: Chemisch-pharmazeutisches Bio- und Bibliographikon. Nemayer, Mittenwald 1938, p. 381.
- Charles Gillispie (Ed.): Dictionary of Scientific Biography. Vol. 10, p. 25 f.
- Wolfgang-Hagen Hein (Ed.): Deutsche Apotheker-Biographie. 2 Vols. Wissenschaftliche Verlagsgesellschaft, Stuttgart 1975/78, Vol. 2, pp. 465–467.
- Christoph Heinrich Kessel: Lebens-Beschreibung D. Caspar Neumanns. In: Caspar Neumann: Chymiae medicae dogmatico experimentalis. Vol. 1, part 1. Johann Jacob Dendeler, Züllichau 1749 (online).
- Noretta Koertge: Complete Dictionary of Scientific Biography. New York, 2008: Entry on Caspar Neumann.
- Alexander Kraft: On Two Letters from Caspar Neumann to John Woodward Revealing the Secret Method for Preparation of Prussian Blue. Bulletin of the History Chemistry, Vol. 34, No. 2 (2009), pp. 134–140.
- Hermann Ludwig: Caspar Neumann (Biographisches Denkmal). In: Archiv der Pharmazie. Vol. 132 (1855), part 2, pp. 209–217, doi:10.1002/ardp.18551320243.
- Johann Christian Poggendorff (Ed.): Biographisch-literarisches Handwörterbuch zur Geschichte der exacten Wissenschaften. Vol. 2 (1863), p. 273 (online).
- Otto Zekert: Berühmte Apotheker. 2 Vols. Deutscher Apotheker-Verlag, Stuttgart 1955/62, Vol. 2, p. 35 f.
