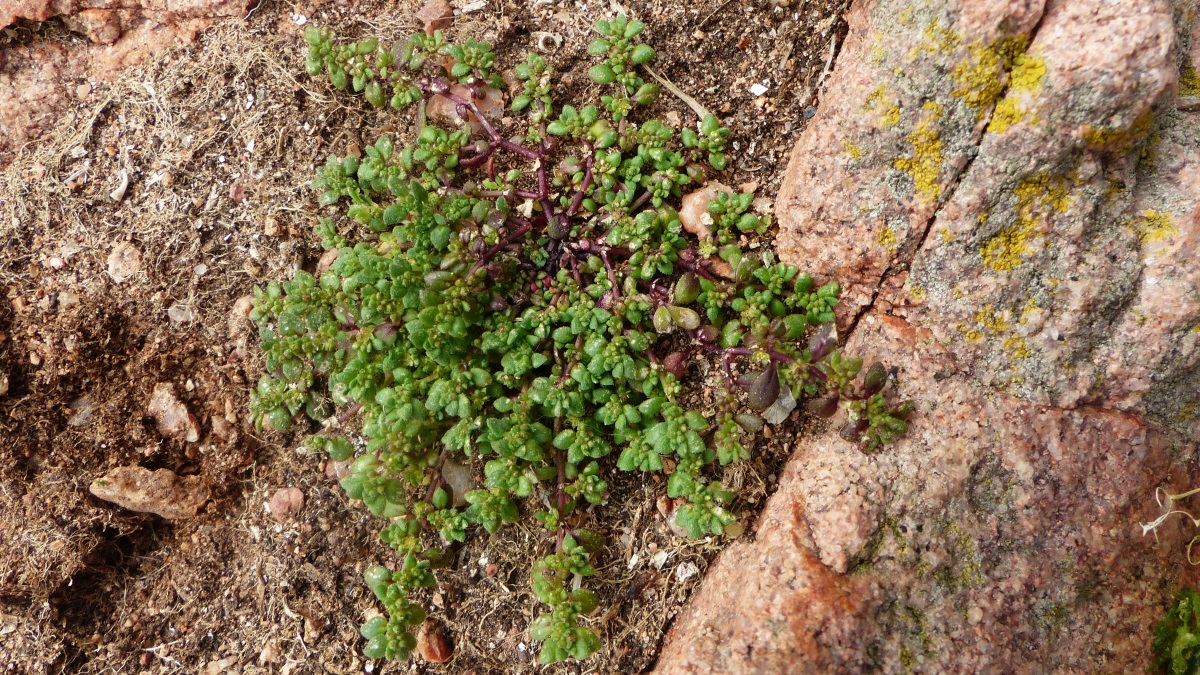

Conservation status
- Endangered (IUCN 3.1)

Scientific classification
- Kingdom: Plantae
- Clade: Tracheophytes
- Clade: Angiosperms
- Clade: Eudicots
- Order: Caryophyllales
- Family: Caryophyllaceae
- Genus: Herniaria
- Species: H. lusitanica
- Subspecies: H. l. subsp. berlengiana

Trinomial name
- Herniaria lusitanica subsp. berlengiana Chaudhri

Synonyms
- Herniaria berlengiana (Chaudhri) Franco

= Herniaria lusitanica subsp. berlengiana =

Subspecies of plant

Herniaria lusitanica subsp. berlengiana is an endangered subspecies of flowering plant in the family Caryophyllaceae. It is endemic to the Berlengas Archipelago, Portugal.

== Description ==
Herniaria lusitanica subsp. berlengiana is a biennal or perennial plant much smaller than its mainland counterpart (subsp. lusitanica). Stems are thin and grow up to about 5 cm (2.0 in), leaves are 4 mm × 2.25 mm (0.157 in × 0.089 in) and have short hairs, curly when young. Glomeruli have 4-7(10) flowers, 1–1.5 mm (0.039–0.059 in).

== Distribution and habitat ==
Herniaria lusitanica subsp. berlengiana inhabits the Berlengas on Berlenga Grande, the Farilhões Islets and Inês Islet 10 to 17 km (6.2 to 10.6 mi) off mainland Portugal. The plant has thin herbaceous communities growing mainly in arid sites, skeletal soils and in fissures of granite rocks as well as along hiking trails.

== Threats ==
It is mainly threatened by invasive plant species, namely the sour fig (Carpobrotus edulis), and clearing of hiking paths. Trampling is actually beneficial for this plant as it reduces its competition by keeping surrounding vegetation low.
