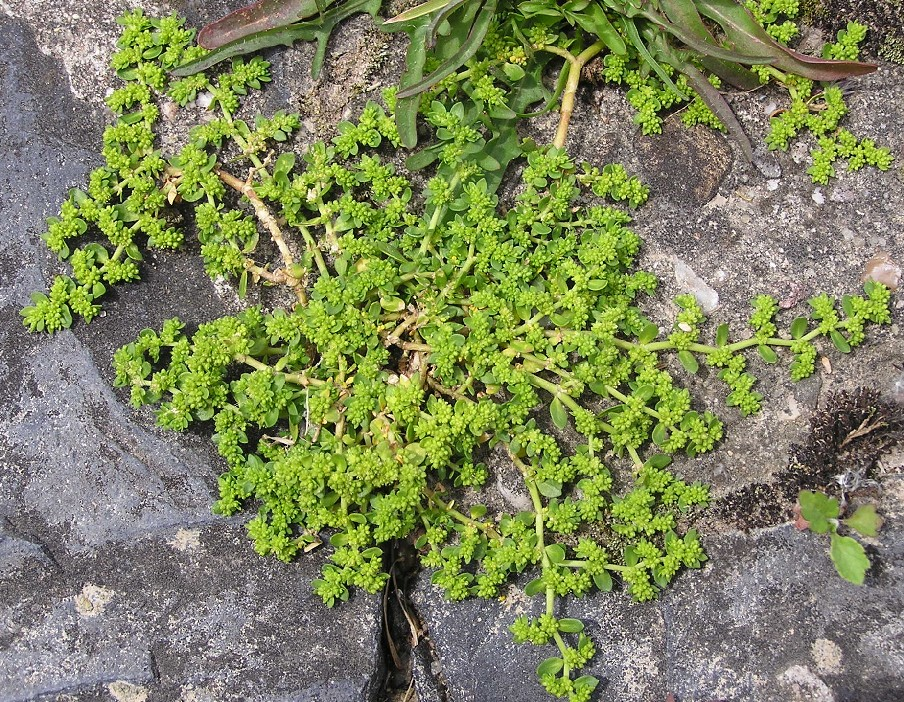

Scientific classification
- Kingdom: Plantae
- Clade: Tracheophytes
- Clade: Angiosperms
- Clade: Eudicots
- Order: Caryophyllales
- Family: Caryophyllaceae
- Genus: Herniaria
- Species: H. glabra

Binomial name
- Herniaria glabra L.

= Herniaria glabra =

Species of flowering plant

Herniaria glabra, the smooth rupturewort, is a plant of the family Caryophyllaceae, and grows in North America and Europe. It contains herniarin, a methoxy analog of umbelliferone.
