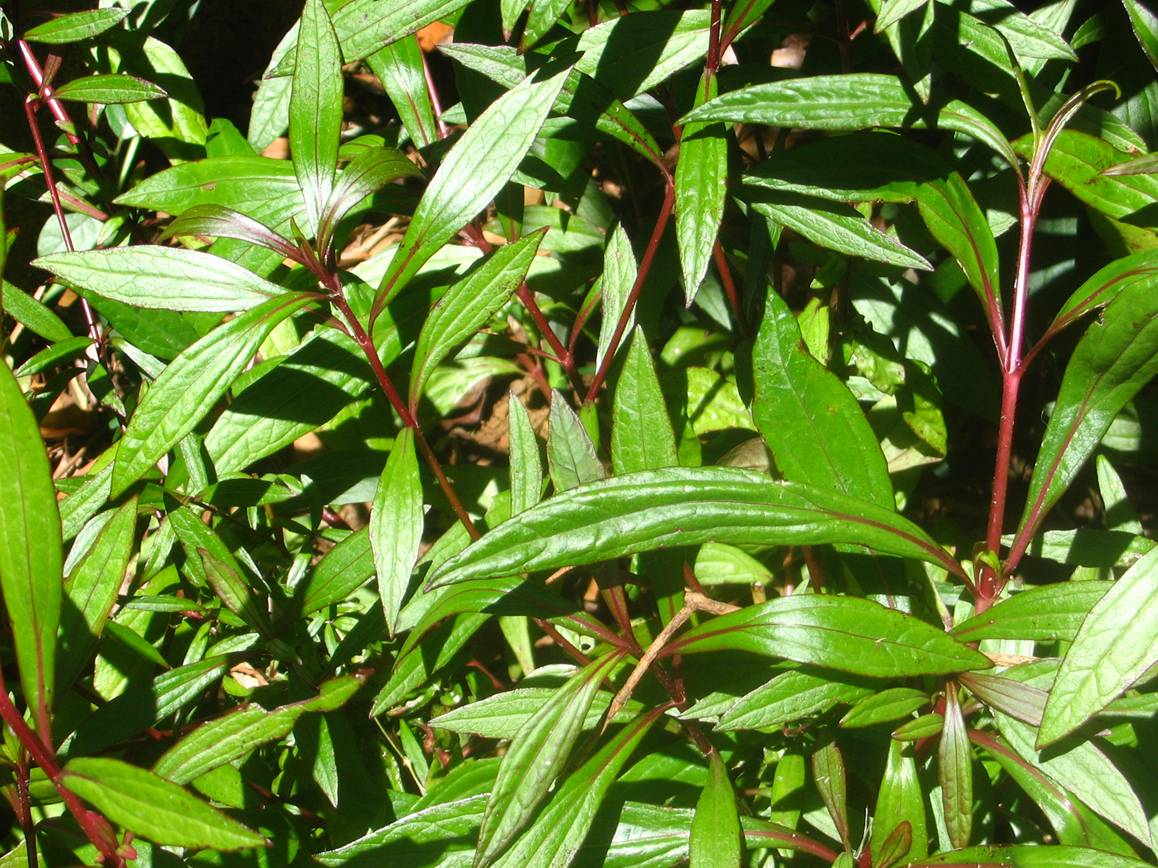
- Ayapana triplinervis

Scientific classification
- Kingdom: Plantae
- Clade: Embryophytes
- Clade: Tracheophytes
- Clade: Spermatophytes
- Clade: Angiosperms
- Clade: Eudicots
- Clade: Asterids
- Order: Asterales
- Family: Asteraceae
- Subfamily: Asteroideae
- Tribe: Eupatorieae
- Genus: Ayapana; Spach

= Ayapana =

Genus of flowering plants

Ayapana is a genus of perennial herbs in the family Asteraceae.

The species of Ayapana at times been classified in the genus Eupatorium. The leaves, at least of Ayapana triplinervis, are commonly used medicinally.

Species

Ayapana is native to South America, Central America, and the West Indies.

- Ayapana amygdalina (Lam.) R.M.King & H.Rob. - Trinidad, Central + South America
- Ayapana ecuadorensis R.M.King & H.Rob. - Ecuador
- Ayapana elata (Steetz) R.M.King & H.Rob. - Peru, Panama, Costa Rica
- Ayapana haughtii R.M.King & H.Rob. - Colombia
- Ayapana herrerae R.M.King & H.Rob. - Panama
- Ayapana hylophila (B.L.Rob.) R.M.King & H.Rob. - Colombia
- Ayapana jaramillii R.M.King & H.Rob. - Colombia
- Ayapana lanceolata R.M.King & H.Rob. - Bolivia, Peru, Pará
- Ayapana lopez-palaciosii V.M.Badillo - Venezuela
- Ayapana ornithophora (B.L.Rob.) R.M.King & H.Rob. - Colombia
- Ayapana pilluanensis (Hieron.) R.M.King & H.Rob. - Venezuela, Peru
- Ayapana robinsonii S.Díaz - Colombia
- Ayapana stenolepis (Steetz) R.M.King & H.Rob. - Colombia, Panama, Bolivia
- Ayapana tovarensis (B.L.Rob.) R.M.King & H.Rob. - Venezuela
- Ayapana trinitensis (Kuntze) R.M.King & H.Rob. - Venezuela, Colombia, Trinidad
- Ayapana triplinervis (Vahl) R.M.King & H.Rob. - Puerto Rico, Lesser Antilles, Trinidad, French Guiana, Ecuador, northern Brazil (Amapá, Amazonas, Pará)
- Ayapana turbacensis (Hieron.) R.M.King & H.Rob. - Colombia, Ecuador
