= Herniarin =

- Chemical structure of herniarin

Names
- Preferred IUPAC name 7-Methoxy-2H-1-benzopyran-2-one
- Other names 7-O-Methylumbelliferone; 7-Methoxycoumarin; Ayapanin; Herniarine; Methyl umbelliferyl ether

Identifiers
CAS Number	531-59-9
3D model (JSmol)	Interactive image
ChEMBL	ChEMBL49732
ChemSpider	10295
ECHA InfoCard	100.007.741
PubChem CID	10748
UNII	DGK72G008A
CompTox Dashboard (EPA)	DTXSID5060196
- InChI: InChI=1S/C10H8O3/c1-12-8-4-2-7-3-5-10(11)13-9(7)6-8/h2-6H,1H3 Key: LIIALPBMIOVAHH-UHFFFAOYSA-N; InChI=1/C10H8O3/c1-12-8-4-2-7-3-5-10(11)13-9(7)6-8/h2-6H,1H3 Key: LIIALPBMIOVAHH-UHFFFAOYAW
- SMILES: O=C/2Oc1cc(OC)ccc1\C=C\2

Properties
Chemical formula	C_{10}H_{8}O_{3}
Molar mass	176.171 g·mol^{−1}
- Except where otherwise noted, data are given for materials in their standard state (at 25 °C [77 °F], 100 kPa). verify (what is ?) Infobox references

Herniarin is a natural chemical compound. Chemically, it can be considered a methoxy derivative of coumarin or a methyl derivative of umbelliferone.

Herniarin is found in Herniaria glabra, Ayapana triplinervis and in species of the genus Prunus (P. mahaleb, P. pensylvanica, and P. maximowiczii).
