= Thymol =

Chemical compound found in plants including thyme

- Thymol

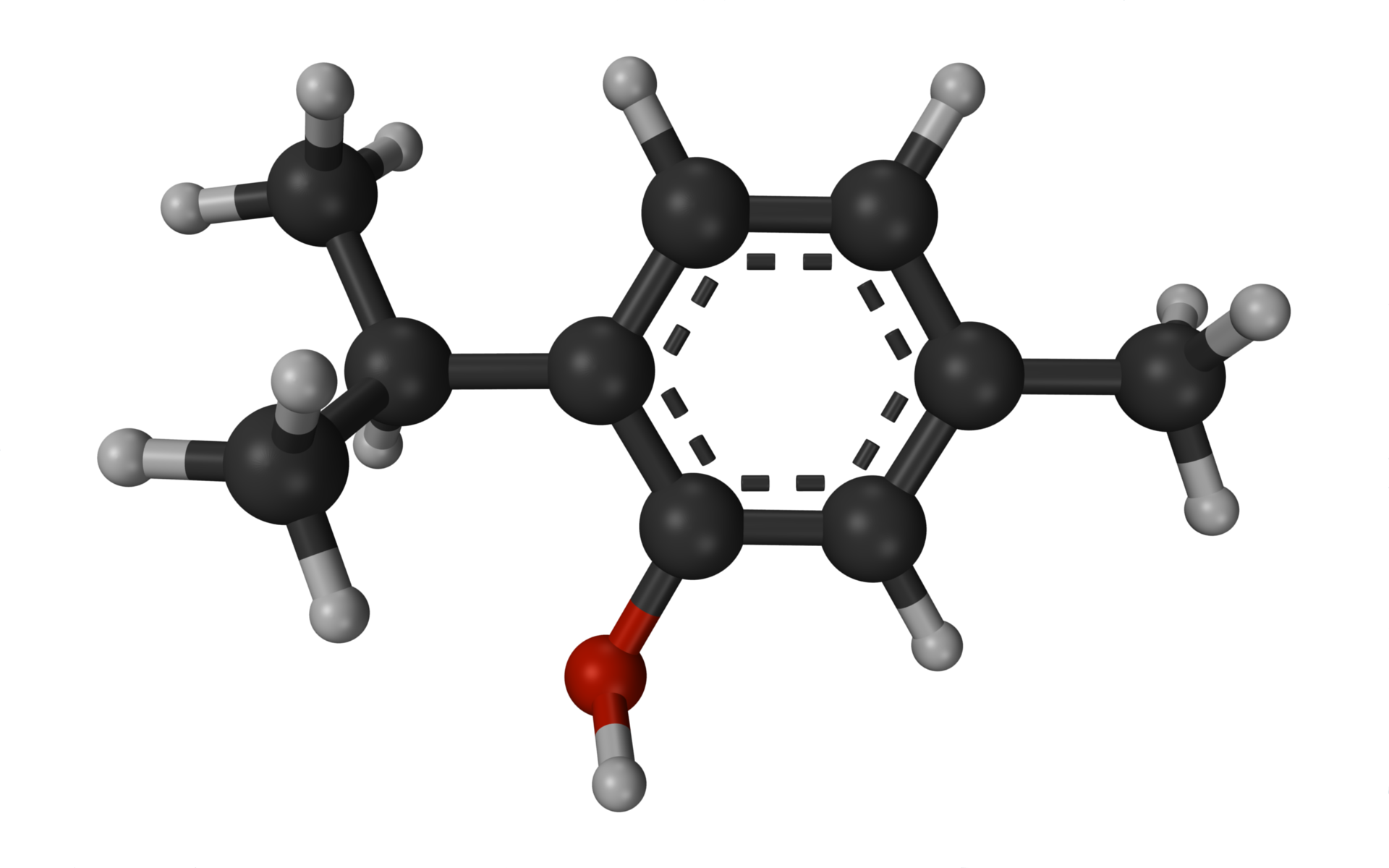

Names
- Preferred IUPAC name 5-Methyl-2-(propan-2-yl)phenol
- Systematic IUPAC name 5-Methyl-2-(propan-2-yl)benzenol
- Other names 2-Isopropyl-5-methylphenol, isopropyl-m-cresol, 1-methyl-3-hydroxy-4-isopropylbenzene, 3-methyl-6-isopropylphenol, 5-methyl-2-(1-methylethyl)phenol, 5-methyl-2-isopropyl-1-phenol, 5-methyl-2-isopropylphenol, 6-isopropyl-3-methylphenol, 6-isopropyl-m-cresol, Apiguard, NSC 11215, NSC 47821, NSC 49142, thyme camphor, m-thymol, and p-cymen-3-ol

Identifiers
CAS Number	89-83-8
3D model (JSmol)	Interactive image
ChEBI	CHEBI:27607
ChEMBL	ChEMBL29411
ChemSpider	21105998
DrugBank	DB02513
ECHA InfoCard	100.001.768
EC Number	201-944-8
IUPHAR/BPS	2499
KEGG	D01039
PubChem CID	6989
UNII	3J50XA376E
CompTox Dashboard (EPA)	DTXSID6034972
- InChI: InChI=1S/C10H14O/c1-7(2)9-5-4-8(3)6-10(9)11/h4-7,11H,1-3H3 Key: MGSRCZKZVOBKFT-UHFFFAOYSA-N; InChI=1/C10H14O/c1-7(2)9-5-4-8(3)6-10(9)11/h4-7,11H,1-3H3 Key: MGSRCZKZVOBKFT-UHFFFAOYAS
- SMILES: CC(C)c1ccc(C)cc1O

Properties
Chemical formula	C_{10}H_{14}O
Molar mass	150.221 g·mol^{−1}
Density	0.96 g/cm^{3}
Melting point	49 to 51 °C (120 to 124 °F; 322 to 324 K)
Boiling point	232 °C (450 °F; 505 K)
Solubility in water	0.9 g/L (20 °C)
Refractive index (n_{D})	1.5208

Pharmacology
ATCvet code	QP53AX22 (WHO)

Hazards
- GHS labelling
Pictograms	(GHS05: Corrosive) (GHS07: Exclamation mark) (GHS09: Environmental hazard)
Signal word	Warning
Hazard statements	H302, H314, H411
Precautionary statements	P260, P264, P270, P273, P280, P301+P312, P301+P330+P331, P303+P361+P353, P304+P340, P305+P351+P338, P310, P321, P330, P363, P391, P405, P501
- Except where otherwise noted, data are given for materials in their standard state (at 25 °C [77 °F], 100 kPa). verify (what is ?) Infobox references

Thymol (also known as 2-isopropyl-5-methylphenol, IPMP), C_{10}H_{14}O, is a monoterpenoid, phenol derivative of p-cymene, isomeric with carvacrol. It occurs naturally in oil of thyme and is extracted from Thymus vulgaris (common thyme), ajwain, and various other plants, as a white crystalline substance with a pleasant aromatic odor.

Thymol provides the distinctive flavor of the culinary herb thyme, also produced from T. vulgaris. Thymol is only slightly soluble in water at neutral pH, but due to deprotonation of the phenol, it is highly soluble in alcohols, other organic solvents, and strongly alkaline aqueous solutions.

== Chemical synthesis ==
Thymol is produced by the alkylation of m-cresol with propene. CH_{3}C_{6}H_{4}OH + CH_{2}CHCH_{3} → ((CH_{3})_{2}CH)CH_{3}C_{6}H_{3}OH

A predicted method of biosynthesis of thymol in thyme and oregano begins with the cyclization of geranyl diphosphate by TvTPS2 to γ-terpinene. Oxidation by a cytochrome P450 in the CYP71D subfamily creates a dienol intermediate, which is then converted into a ketone by short-chain dehydrogenase. Lastly, keto-enol tautomerization gives thymol. Its dissociation constant (pK_{a}) is 10.59±0.10. Thymol absorbs maximum UV radiation at 274 nm.

== History ==
The bee balms Monarda fistulosa and Monarda didyma, North American wildflowers, are natural sources of thymol. The Blackfoot Native Americans recognized these plants' strong antiseptic action and used poultices of the plants for skin infections and minor wounds. A tisane made from them was also used to treat mouth and throat infections caused by dental caries and gingivitis.

Thymol was first isolated by German chemist Caspar Neumann in 1719. In 1853, French chemist Alexandre Lallemand (1816-1886) named thymol and determined its empirical formula. Possible antiseptic properties of thymol were discovered in 1875, and it was first synthesized by Swedish chemist Oskar Widman (1852-1930) in 1882.

== Extraction ==
The conventional method of extracting is hydro-distillation (HD), but can also be extracted with solvent-free microwave extraction (SFME). In 30 minutes, SFME yields similar amounts of thymol with more oxygenated compounds than 4.5 hours of hydro-distillation at atmospheric pressures without the need for solvent.

Predicted biosynthesis of thymol in thyme and oregano. Reconstruction of figure 4 in Krause et al. (2021).

== Uses ==
During the 1910s, thymol was used for hookworm infection in the United States. People of the Middle East continue to use za'atar, a delicacy made with large amounts of thyme, to reduce and eliminate internal parasites. It is also used as a preservative in halothane, an anaesthetic, and as an antiseptic in mouthwash. When used to reduce plaque and gingivitis, thymol has been found to be more effective when used in combination with chlorhexidine than when used purely by itself.

Thymol is a fragrance ingredient in some cosmetics. Thymol has been used to successfully control varroa mites and prevent fermentation and the growth of mold in bee colonies. Thymol is also used as a rapidly degrading, non-persisting pesticide, such as insecticides and fungicides which are leveraged in plant care products. Thymol can also be used as a medical disinfectant and general purpose disinfectant. Thymol is also used in the production of menthol through the hydrogenation of the aromatic ring.

Thymol is commonly used as a starting material in the total synthesis of thymoquinone, a quinone derivative, through catalytic oxidation.

== List of plants that contain thymol ==
- Illicium verum
- Euphrasia rostkoviana
- Lagoecia cuminoides
- Monarda didyma
- Monarda fistulosa
- Mosla chinensis
- Ocimum gratissimum L.
- Origanum compactum
- Origanum dictamnus
- Origanum onites
- Origanum syriacum
- Origanum vulgare
- Satureja hortensis
- Satureja thymbra
- Thymus glandulosus
- Thymus hyemalis
- Thymus serpyllum
- Thymus praecox
- Thymus vulgaris
- Thymus zygis
- Trachyspermum ammi

== Toxicology and environmental impacts ==
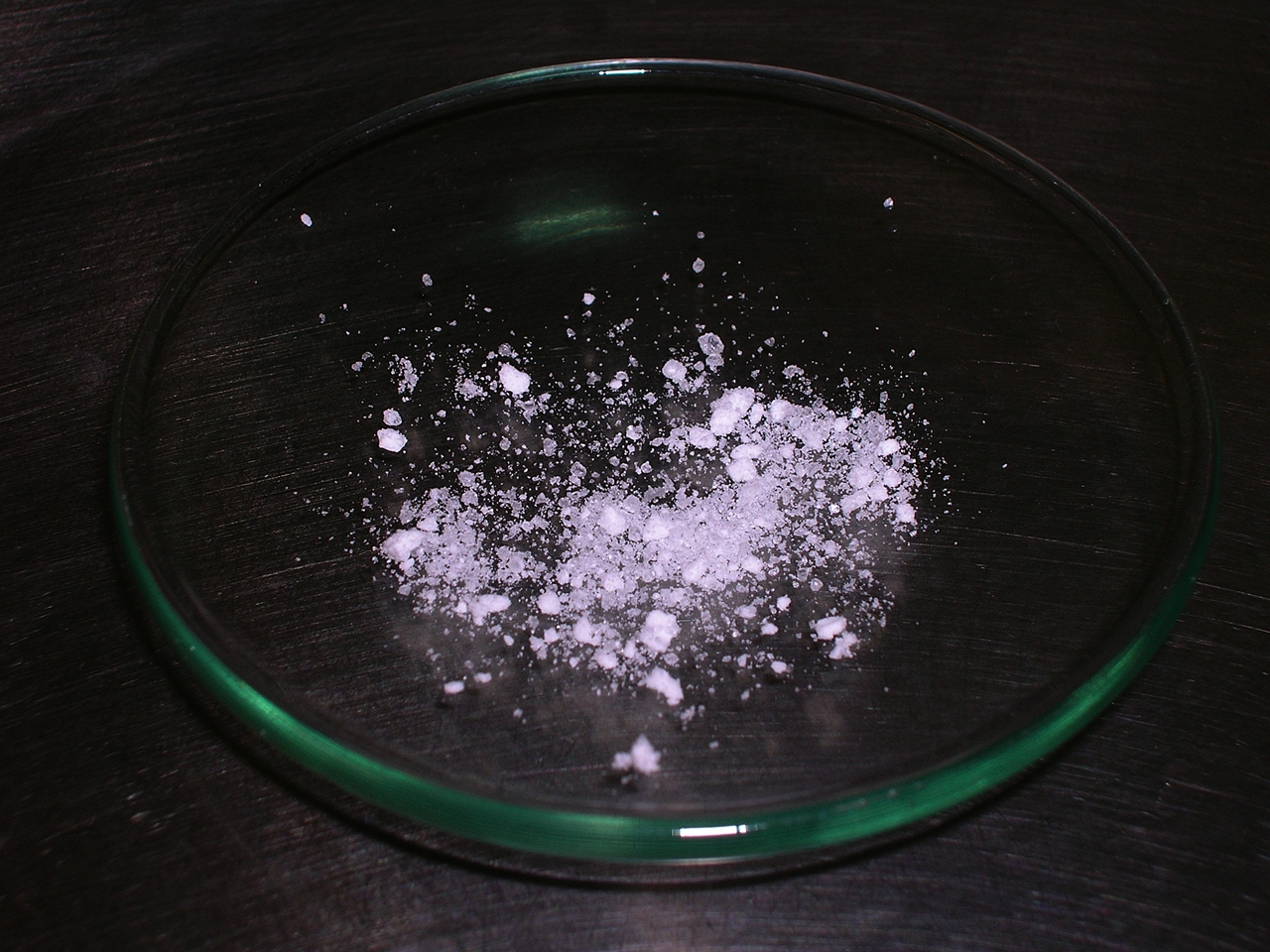
Thymol powder

In 2009, the U.S. Environmental Protection Agency (EPA) reviewed the research literature on the toxicology and environmental impact of thymol and concluded that "thymol has minimal potential toxicity and poses minimal risk".

=== Environmental breakdown and use as a pesticide ===
Studies have shown that hydrocarbon monoterpenes and thymol in particular degrade rapidly (DT_{50} 16 days in water, 5 days in soil) in the environment and are, thus, low risks because of rapid dissipation and low bound residues, supporting the use of thymol as a pesticide agent that offers a safe alternative to other more persistent chemical pesticides that can be dispersed in runoff and produce subsequent contamination. Though, there has been recent research into sustained released systems for botanically derived pesticides, such as using natural polysaccharides which would be biodegradable and biocompatible.

== Compendial status ==
- British Pharmacopoeia
- Japanese Pharmacopoeia

== See also ==
- Thymoquinone
- Nigella sativa
- Bromothymol
