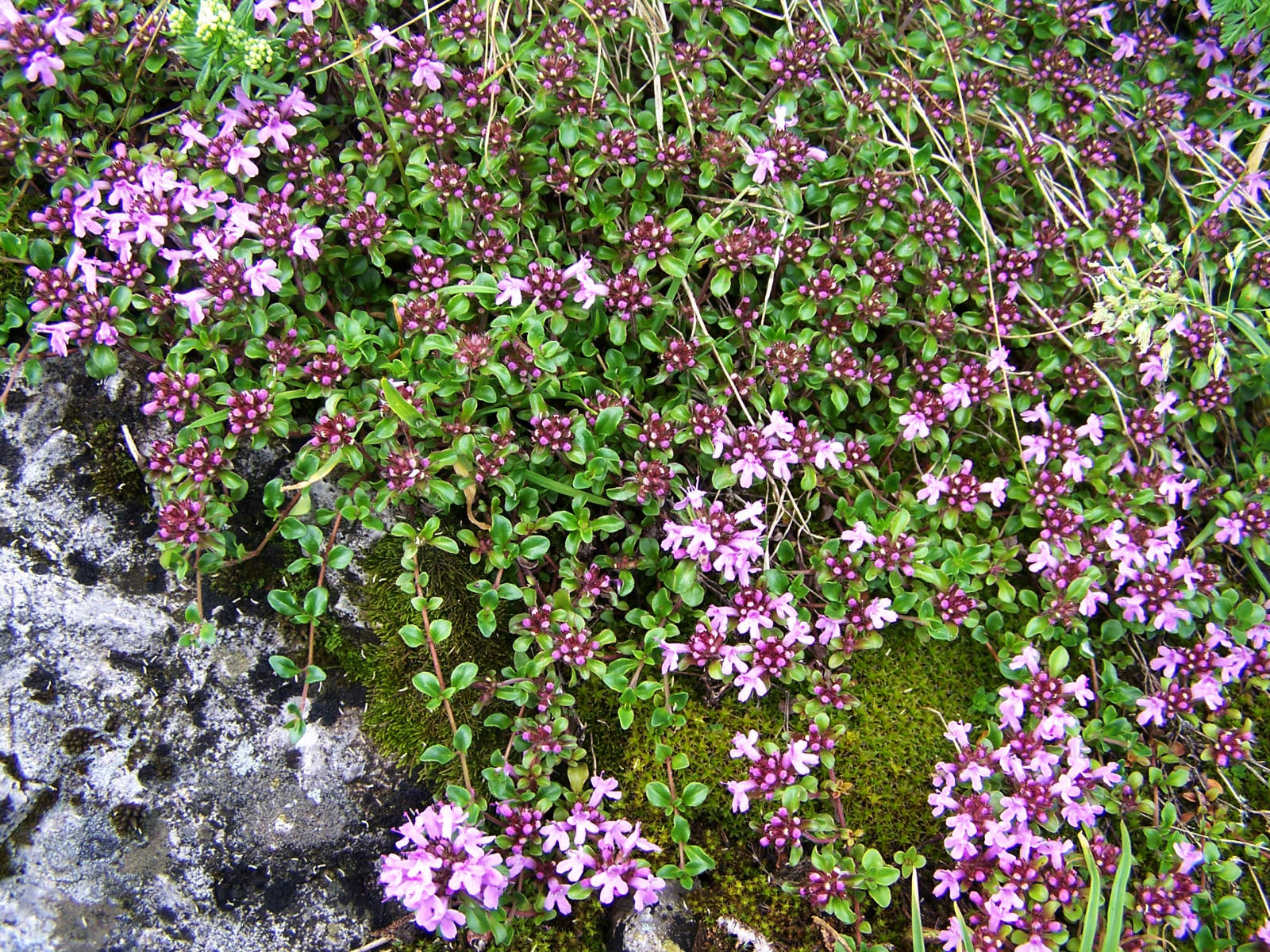

Scientific classification
- Kingdom: Plantae
- Clade: Tracheophytes
- Clade: Angiosperms
- Clade: Eudicots
- Clade: Asterids
- Order: Lamiales
- Family: Lamiaceae
- Genus: Thymus
- Species: T. alpestris

Binomial name
- Thymus alpestris Tausch ex A.Kern.

= Thymus alpestris =

Species of flowering plant

Thymus alpestris is a species of flowering plant in the family Lamiaceae native to the eastern Alps and Carpathians.
