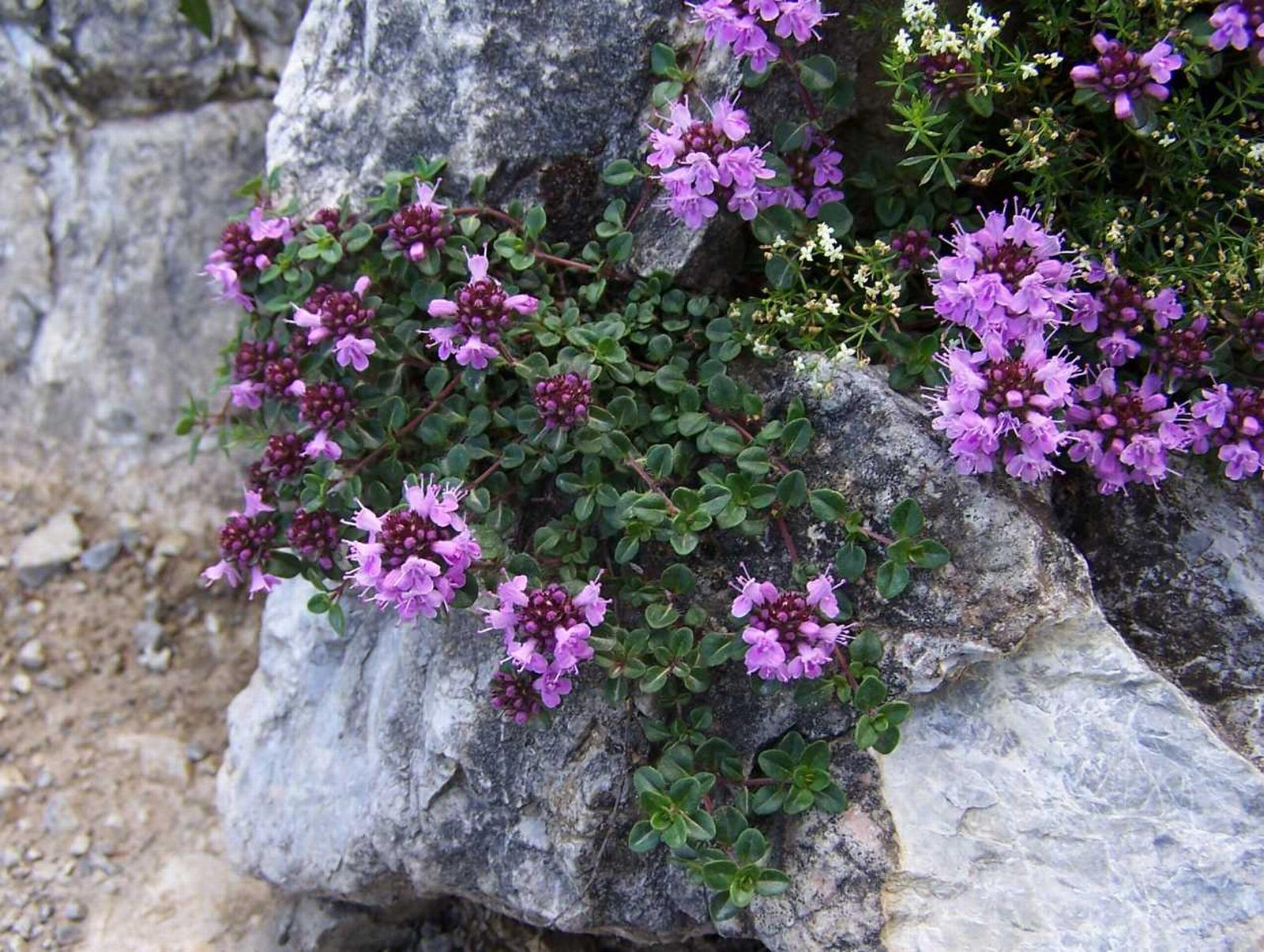

Scientific classification
- Kingdom: Plantae
- Clade: Embryophytes
- Clade: Tracheophytes
- Clade: Spermatophytes
- Clade: Angiosperms
- Clade: Eudicots
- Clade: Asterids
- Order: Lamiales
- Family: Lamiaceae
- Genus: Thymus
- Species: T. pulcherrimus

Binomial name
- Thymus pulcherrimus Schur

= Thymus pulcherrimus =

Species of flowering plant

Thymus pulcherrimus is a flowering plant in the family Lamiaceae native to Poland, Czechia, Slovakia, Romania, and Ukraine.
