= Low sodium diet =

Diet with reduced sodium intake

A low sodium diet is a diet that includes no more than 1,500 to 2,400 mg of sodium per day.

The human minimum requirement for sodium in the diet is about 500 mg per day, which is typically less than one-sixth as much as many diets "seasoned to taste". For certain people with salt-sensitive blood pressure or diseases such as Ménière's disease, this extra intake may cause a negative effect on health.

WHO guidelines state that adults should consume less than 2,000 mg of sodium/day (i.e. about 5 grams; 1/6 oz of traditional table salt), and at least 3,510 mg of potassium per day. In Europe, adults and children consume about twice as much sodium as recommended by experts.

== Health effects ==
A low sodium diet has a useful effect to reduce blood pressure, both in people with hypertension and in people with normal blood pressure. Taken together, a low salt diet (median of approximately 4.4 g/day – approx 1800 mg sodium) in hypertensive people resulted in a decrease in systolic blood pressure by 4.2 mmHg, and in diastolic blood pressure by 2.1 mmHg.

Advising people to eat a low salt diet, however, is of unclear effect in either hypertensive or normal tensive people. In 2012, the British Journal Heart published an article claiming that a low salt diet appears to increase the risk of death in those with congestive heart failure, but the article was retracted in 2013. The article was retracted by the journal when it was found that two of the studies cited contained duplicate data that could not be verified.

A doctor might prescribe a low sodium diet for patients with diabetes insipidus.

A 2021 Cochrane review of controlled trials in people with chronic kidney disease at any stage, including those on dialysis, found high-certainty evidence that reduced salt intake may help to lower both systolic and diastolic blood pressure, as well as albuminuria. However there was also moderate certainty evidence that some people may experience hypotensive symptoms, such as dizziness, following sudden sodium restriction. It is unclear whether this affects the dosage required for anti-hypertensive medications. The effect of salt restriction on extracellular fluid, oedema, and total body weight reduction was also uncertain.

=== Negative effects ===
Approximately 15% of adults have inverse salt sensitivity, with blood pressure increasing from eating less salt.

== Food and drink contents ==
Sodium occurs naturally in most foods. The most common form of sodium is sodium chloride, which may be found sold as—depending on the size and shape of the salt crystals—table salt, sea salt, and kosher salt, among others. Milk, beets, and celery also naturally contain sodium, as does drinking water, although the amount varies depending on the source. Sodium is also added to various food products. Some of these added forms are monosodium glutamate (MSG), sodium nitrite, sodium saccharin, baking soda (sodium bicarbonate), and sodium benzoate.

Because large amounts of salts are given out by regenerative water softeners, over 60 cities in Southern California have banned them because of elevated salt levels in ground water reclamation projects. Water labeled as "drinking water" in supermarkets contains natural sodium since it is usually only filtered with a carbon filter and will contain any sodium present in the source water.

=== High sodium content ===
Condiments and seasonings such as Worcestershire sauce, soy sauce, onion salt, garlic salt, and bouillon cubes contain sodium. Processed meats, such as bacon, sausage, and ham, and canned soups and vegetables are all examples of foods that contain added sodium. Fast foods are generally very high in sodium. Also, processed foods such as potato chips, frozen dinners and cured meats have high sodium content.

=== Low sodium content ===
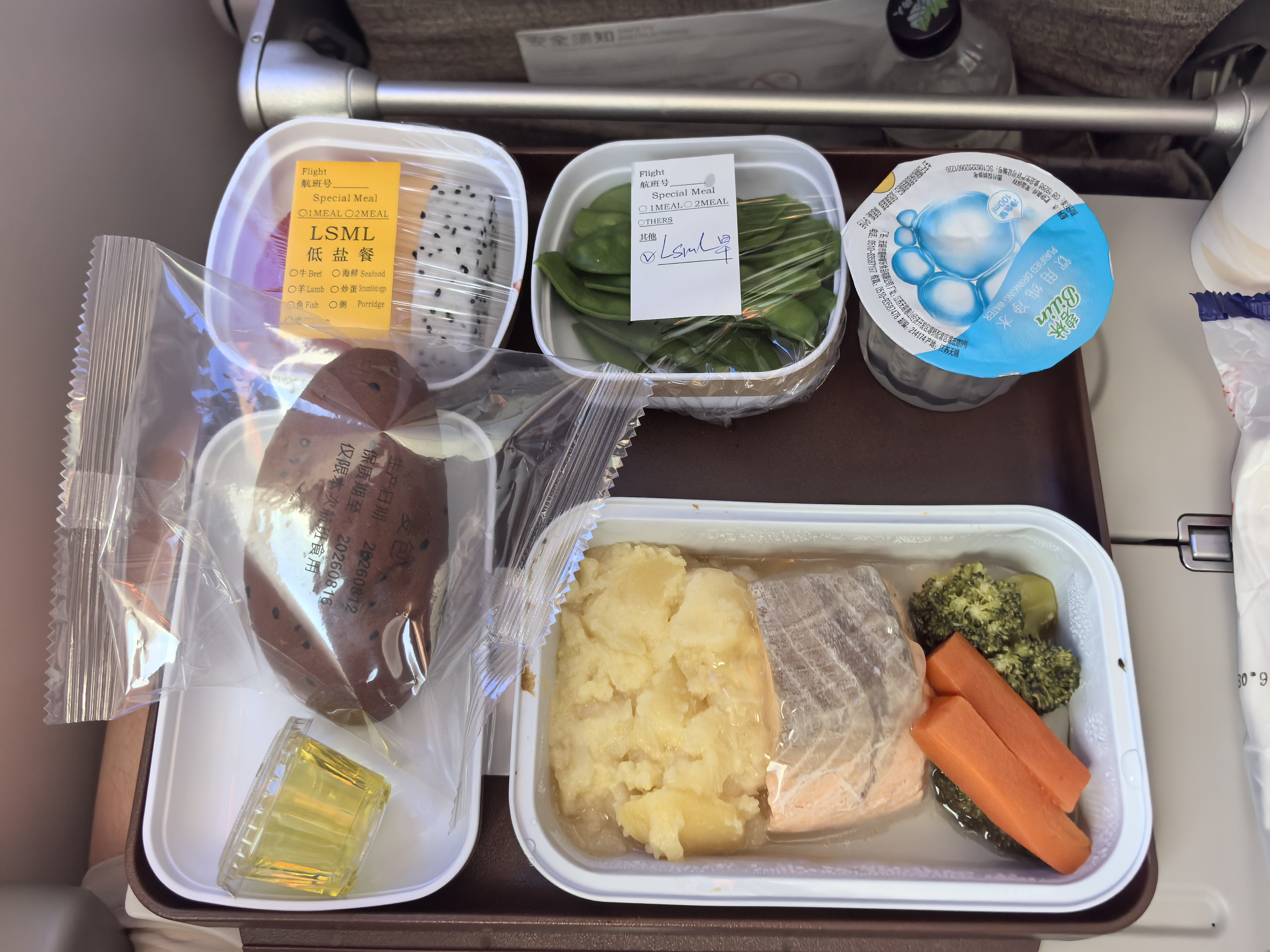
Example of a low sodium airline meal

Unprocessed, fresh foods, such as fresh fruits, most vegetables, beef, poultry, fish and unprocessed grains are low in sodium. Low– or no–sodium products, and corresponding versions of products otherwise high in sodium, can be found in stores as well as online. Salt substitutes such as potassium chloride may be used to provide a similar taste to salt while reducing sodium intake, and flavor additives such as monosodium glutamate can help reduce sodium intake by enhancing other flavors.

Other foods that are low in sodium include:

- Seasonings: Black, cayenne, or lemon pepper, mustard, some chili or hot sauces
- Herbs: Dried or fresh garlic, garlic/onion powder (no salt), dill, parsley, rosemary, basil, cinnamon, cloves, paprika, oregano, ginger, vinegar, cumin, nutmeg
- Most fresh fruits and vegetables, exceptions include celery, carrots, beets, and spinach
- Dried beans, peas, rice, lentils
- Macaroni, pasta, noodles, rice, barley (cooked in unsalted water)
- Honey, sugar
- Unsalted butter
- Unsalted dry curd cottage cheese
- Fresh beef, pork, lamb, fish, shrimp, egg
- Milk, yogurt
- Hot cereals/Porridge
- Club soda, coffee, seltzer water, soy milk, tea

== See also ==
- Diabetes insipidus
- Health effects of salt
- Health Canada Sodium Working Group
- Hyponatremia
- DASH-Sodium study
- List of diets
