= Blue cheese dressing =

Salad dressing and dip

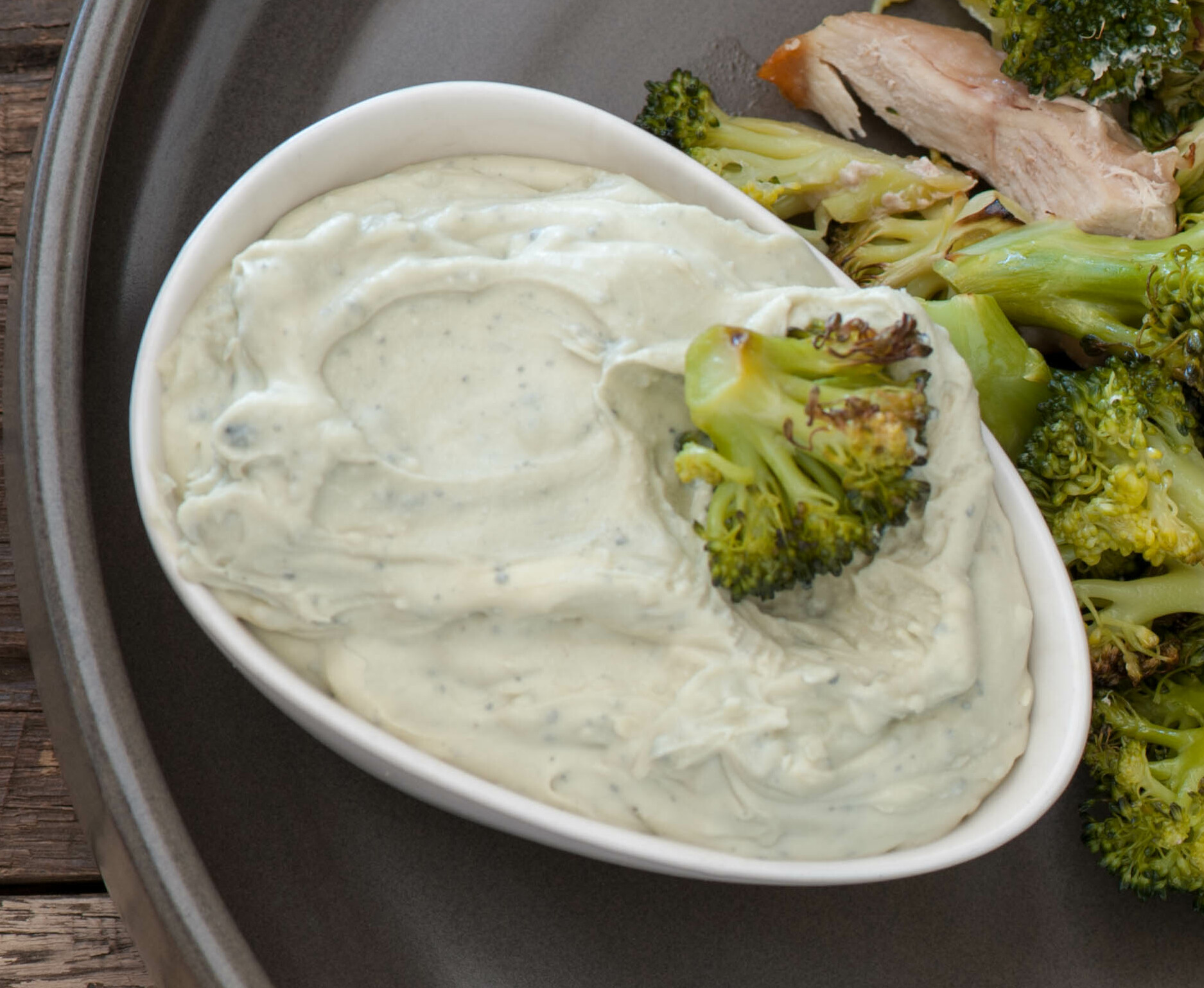
- Broccoli served with a blue cheese dressing dip
- Type: Salad dressing or dip
- Place of origin: United States
- Main ingredients: Mayonnaise, sour cream or yogurt, blue cheese, milk, vinegar, onion powder, wine, cumin, garlic powder
- Variations: Blue cheese vinaigrette

Blue cheese dressing is a popular side sauce, salad dressing and dip in the United States and Canada. It is usually made of some combination of blue cheese, mayonnaise, and buttermilk, sour cream or yogurt, milk, vinegar, onion powder, and garlic powder. There is a blue cheese vinaigrette that consists of salad oil, blue cheese, vinegar, and sometimes seasonings.

Most major salad dressing producers and restaurants in the United States and Canada produce a variant of blue cheese dressing. It is commonly served as a dip with Buffalo wings or crudités (raw vegetables).

== Culinary uses ==
In addition to being used as a salad dressing, blue cheese dressing pairs well with a number of ingredients like chicken, turkey, garlic bread, and corn. It can be used as a dressing for sandwiches or wraps or incorporated in dips with other ingredients like cream cheese, sour cream, and hot sauce.

== Safety and storage ==
Separation of water and oil (instability of the emulsion) is a potential problem with blue cheese dressing. Microbial spoilage is a concern for any type of processed food. Studies have shown that Saccharomyces bailii and Lactobacillus fructivorans are two common microorganisms that spoil salad dressings. Lactobacillus fructivorans is a facultative anaerobe that is acid tolerant, and can survive in a low pH food such as blue cheese dressing.

== See also ==
- Cheese sauce
- List of dips
- Salad dressing
