= The Solar Film =

- Directed by: Elaine Bass; Saul Bass
- Release date: 1979
- Running time: 9 minutes
- Country: United States
- Language: English
- Budget: $402,699

The Solar Film (also known as A Short Film on Solar Energy) is a 1979 short film by Elaine and Saul Bass and produced by Michael Britton. The film was financed through Robert Redford's Wildwood Enterprises with 50-50 funding coming from Philanthropist Norton Simon and Warner Communications and a budget of $402,699.

== Summary ==
This film takes a look at the short history of solar energy, what it is and how can it be used culturally and biologically.

Mike Oldfield's Tubular Bells was used in the film.

The film was commissioned by Robert Redford who also served as executive producer.

== Accolades ==
- 1980: Nominated for Academy Award for Best Live Action Short Film

== See also ==
- Why Man Creates, Saul Bass's 1968 Oscar-winning documentary short about creativity
