= Elaine Bass =

American title designer and filmmaker (born 1927)

- Born: Elaine Makatura; 1927 (age 98–99); New York City, U.S.
- Occupations: Graphic designer, title designer, film director
- Spouse: Saul Bass (m. 1961; died 1996)
- Children: 2

Elaine Bass (née Makatura; born 1927) is an American title designer and filmmaker.

Elaine Bass is a title designer and filmmaker. She is one of the main designers who helped to elevate the short film and the title sequence to an art form. She collaborated with graphic designer, title designer, and filmmaker Saul Bass for 40 years. Together, they developed many projects for directors such as Martin Scorsese and Danny DeVito.

== Early life ==
Elaine Bass was born in 1927 in New York City, United States, to Hungarian immigrants. The youngest of four daughters, she showed early promise at art, creating stories and drawing them, frame by frame, on the sidewalk. In the early 1940s, the daughters began singing professionally as the Belmont Sisters. At the age of twelve, she was admitted to the New York High School of Music and Art but withdrew in order to pursue her professional singing. She was the lead singer and soloist, and recordings made when she was fourteen to eighteen reveal a surprisingly mature voice singing swing with touches of Billie Holiday. During World War II, the group sang in service clubs and on the radio until the oldest sisters left the group to get married.

== Design career ==
At age eighteen and after six years of singing with her sisters, Elaine Bass began to work in the New York fashion industry, producing fashion renderings and sketches for several fashion houses. In 1947, she moved to Los Angeles, settling there permanently in 1954. Soon thereafter she started working in the design department of Capitol Records. She recalled: "After about a year I was looking for something more challenging when someone told me that Saul Bass was looking for an assistant. I had enjoyed the credits for The Seven Year Itch very much but the name 'Saul Bass' didn't mean anything to me."

Elaine Bass joined the office in 1955. She co-designed the opening title sequence to Spartacus (1960), uncredited. The following year, the couple married and after the birth of their children, Jennifer in 1964 and Jeffrey in 1967, Elaine Bass concentrated on motherhood, film directing, and title sequences.

== Film title design ==
Elaine Bass co-designed title sequences with Saul Bass, and employed diverse filmmaking techniques from Bunraku-style maneuvers in Spartacus (1960), live action sequences in Walk on the Wild Side (1962), Nine Hours to Rama (1963), The Victors (1963), Seconds (1966), Grand Prix (1966) to time-lapse photography in The Age of Innocence (1993), and even chopped liver in Mr. Saturday Night (1992).

From the mid-1960s to the late 1980s, the Basses moved away from main titles to focus on filmmaking and their children Jennifer born in 1964 and Jeffrey born in 1967. Remarking on this time, Saul said:

"Elaine and I feel we are there to serve the film and to approach the task with a sense of responsibility. We saw a lot of pyrotechnics and fun and games and I suppose we lost interest. At the same time, an increasing number of directors now sought to open their own films in ambitious ways rather than hire someone else to do it. Whatever the reasons, the result was ‘Fade Out.’ We did not worry about it: we had too many other interesting projects to get on with. Equally, because we still loved the process of making titles, we were happy to take it up again when asked. ‘Fade In’…"

In the 1980s, the Basses were rediscovered by James L. Brooks and Martin Scorsese who had grown up admiring Saul Bass's film work. For Scorsese, Saul and Elaine Bass created title sequences for Goodfellas (1990), Cape Fear (1991), The Age of Innocence (1993), and Casino (1995), their last title sequence. This later work with Scorsese saw the Basses move away from the optical techniques that Saul Bass had pioneered in his early career and move into the use of computerized effects. These later title sequences featured new and innovative methods of production and startling graphic design.

Director Martin Scorsese spoke about his collaboration with the Basses, saying:

"I had the honor of working with Saul and Elaine Bass on the title sequences of four pictures in a row. Each time they would study the film, take a few months, and then send us back a test that exceeded my wildest expectations. The simple, speeding graphic of the Goodfellas (1990) titles synced to the sound of speeding cars on an expressway … the ominous, wavering reflections in water of phantom images that began Cape Fear (1991) … the endlessly blooming flowers, like love renewing itself again and again, under layers of lace for The Age of Innocence (1993) … the form of a man falling through a neon hell in Casino (1995). These title sequences didn’t just complement my pictures, they gave them another layer, embodying the themes and the emotions in a way that led viewers into the mystery of the film without giving it all away. And, of course, every sequence was different in style and approach."

Screenwriter Nicholas Pileggi said of the Basses, "You write a book of 300 to 400 pages and then you boil it down to a script of maybe 100 to 150 pages. Eventually you have the pleasure of seeing that the Basses have knocked you right out of the ballpark. They have boiled it down to four minutes flat."

== Film title sequences ==
(uncredited as a title designer until 1989)

- Spartacus (1960)
- West Side Story (1961)
- Walk on the Wild Side (1962)
- Nine Hours to Rama (1963)
- The Victors (1963)
- Seconds (1966)
- Grand Prix (1966)
- Broadcast News (1987)
- Big (1988)
- The War of the Roses (1989)
- Goodfellas (1990)
- Cape Fear (1991)
- Doc Hollywood (1991)
- Mr. Saturday Night (1992)
- The Age of Innocence (1993)
- Higher Learning (1995)
- Casino (1995)

== Filmmaker ==
During the 1960s, the Basses were asked by directors and producers to produce not only title sequences for their films, but they were also commissioned to create short films for various corporations and events. The Basses' first joint venture into short filmmaking was with promotional films for pavilions at the 1964 New York World's Fair, co-produced with Sy Wexler, entitled From Here to There for United Airlines and The Searching Eye for Eastman Kodak. In 1968, they made the short film Why Man Creates, which won the Academy Award for Documentary Short Subject. An abbreviated version of that film was broadcast that year on the first episode of the television newsmagazine 60 Minutes. This film was an inductee to the 2002 National Film Registry list, commenting that "the film distills its narrative into metaphors represented by Bass's signature iconography."

The Basses directed several other short films, two of which were nominated for Oscar competition; Notes on the Popular Arts in 1977, and The Solar Film in 1979, the latter for which Robert Redford was the executive producer. In 1984, they directed the film "Quest", co-written by Ray Bradbury, for the Mokichi Okada Association.

== Legacy ==
Although Saul and Elaine Bass collaborated closely for 40 years and Saul himself often spoke of Elaine and used the pronoun "we" when interviewed alone, she is not widely acknowledged as co-creator of these important cinematic works. Indeed, even contemporary critics of the 60s generally focused on Saul alone, referring to him as "Bass" and "a master." In fact, Elaine often directed individual sequences and participated as equal partner in the tasks of producing, writing, cinematography, and editing, and always played a leading role in choosing the music and working with the composer, but is still often ignored or seen as an addendum by filmmakers and journalists. This may be because she was uncredited as a title designer on films until 1989.

For instance, Quentin Tarantino, when speaking about Scorsese's collaboration with the Basses, has said: "Saul Bass was undoubtedly the greatest title sequence maker. Brilliant – just brilliant. He has been a 'hero' for years. But, and it's a big but, I could never do what Scorsese does – give up control of the opening of my film to someone else, not even Saul Bass – I guess I should say Saul and Elaine Bass."

== See also ==
- Motion graphics
- Film title design
- Saul Bass
- Pablo Ferro
