= Spiedie =

Type of sandwich associated with New York State

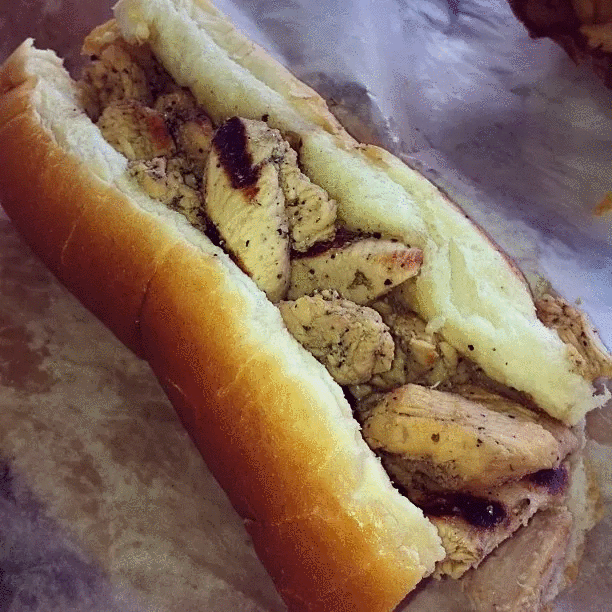
- Chicken spiedie sandwich
- Type: Sandwich
- Place of origin: United States
- Region or state: Binghamton, New York
- Created by: Camillo Iacovelli, Agostino Iacovelli, Peter Sharak
- Serving temperature: Hot
- Main ingredients: Cubes of marinated chicken, pork, lamb, veal, venison, beef or tofu

The spiedie (/ˈspiːdi/) is a food consisting of marinated meat (chicken currently the most popular choice) that is often threaded onto skewers before being grilled and served on a long bread roll or sliced Italian bread. Spiedies are claimed to be local to Binghamton in the central Southern Tier of New York, and somewhat more broadly known and enjoyed throughout Central New York, however, have existed in regions of Italy for much longer. A spiedie consists of cubes of chicken, pork, lamb, veal, venison, beef, or tofu. The meat is marinated overnight or longer, then grilled on spits over a charcoal pit.

The traditional method involves serving freshly prepared cubes of lamb, chicken, or beef on soft Italian bread or a submarine roll, occasionally drizzled with fresh marinade. Spiedie meat can also be eaten straight off the skewer or can be served in salads, stir fries, and a number of other dishes. The marinade recipe varies, usually involving olive oil, vinegar, and a variety of Italian spices and fresh mint.

Spiedies have been celebrated at the Spiedie Fest and Balloon Rally in Binghamton every August since 1983. The annual event includes a spiedie cook-off in search of the best spiedie recipes.

== Etymology ==
The term "spiedie" is derived from the Italian: spiedo meaning spit. The regional dish called spiedini or spidducci in Abruzzo, Italy, most closely resembling spiedie, uses cubes or balls of goat meat, lamb, chicken or beef on a skewer.

== History ==
The original idea for the spiedie was brought by Italian immigrants to upstate New York in the early 1920s. The specific origin of the spiedie is disputed. Traditionally, the early Broome County spiedie was made only from spring lamb, but currently most commercial restaurants prepare spiedies using chicken or pork. The "chicken category" was added to the Spiedie Fest cook-off in 1987, and quickly became the most popular meat choice.

=== Origins ===
Camillo Iacovelli created the spiedie in Endwell and was serving them in 1938 at his Parkview Restaurant on Oak Hill Ave in Endicott. His brother, Agostino "Augie" Iacovelli, popularized spiedies when he introduced them in his Endicott restaurant Augie's in 1939. Iacovelli's marinade, which he called "zuzu," originally was made simply from wine vinegar, water, lemon juice, garlic and mint. Italian spices, olive oil and minced onion were added later as regional tastes and the choice of meat began to vary. Augie Iacovelli's son Guido continued in the spiedie business into the 1990s, owning as many as 26 restaurants at the peak of his career.

Peter Sharak is also alleged to have invented spiedies, and began serving them in 1947 at his Sharkey's Bar and Grill in Binghamton. Sharkey's promotes itself as the birthplace of the sandwich in television commercials across the greater Binghamton area.

=== Growth in popularity ===
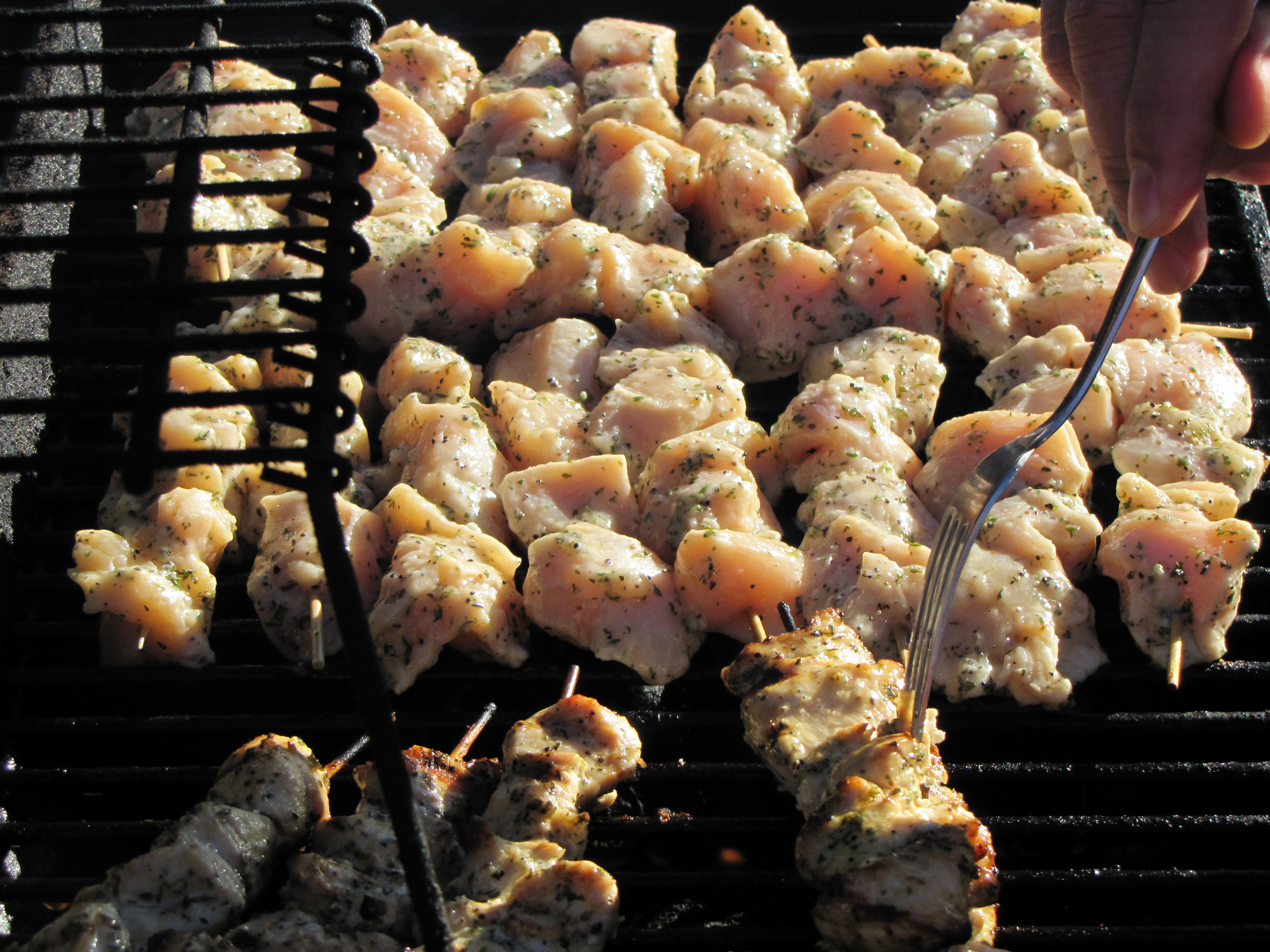
Spiedies being grilled

In 1975, Rob Salamida became the first person to bottle the sauce and sell it. He began by cooking spiedies outside a local tavern at 16. After writing letters for over a year, he was allowed to have his own booth at the New York State Fair in Syracuse, New York. For 12 years he built his reputation at the fair. After a tornado nearly struck his stand in 1975, he decided it would be more lucrative and safer to bottle a spiedie marinade.

One of the most popular shops to purchase spiedies in the Southern Tier, as popularity for the marinades and sandwiches grew, was Lupo's. Lupo's marinades and spiedies were still available locally at the Lupo's S&S Charpit until 2023 when it closed, but the marinade is still available in stores.

In 1983, a few families got together and held a Spiedie Fest that was a tremendous hit. Coupled with a Balloon Rally, it quickly grew to an annual festival attracting more than 100,000 attendees (and also one of the top balloon rallies in the country).

In 2013, President Barack Obama visited Binghamton University to promote his affordable college plan and joked that he was going to get a spiedie while in Binghamton.

== See also ==
- Arrosticini
- Chislic
- City chicken
- Souvlaki
- Kebab
- Shish taouk – a similar food popular in Egypt and Turkey
- List of sandwiches
