= City chicken =

Cubes of meat cooked on a skewer

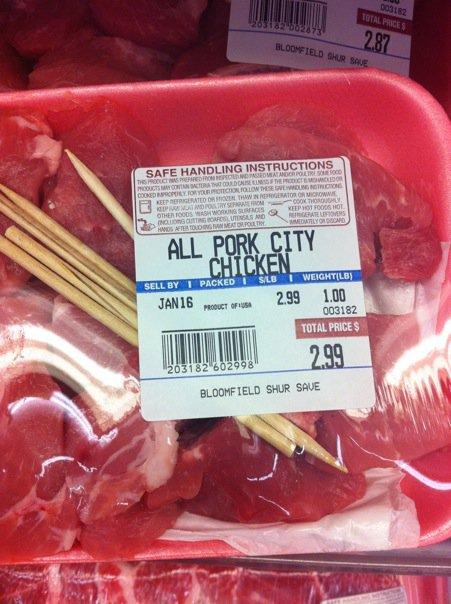
A package of all-pork city chicken, found in Pittsburgh, Pennsylvania

City chicken is an American entrée consisting of cubes of meat, typically pork, which have been placed on a wooden skewer (approximately 4–5 inches or 10–13 centimetres long), then fried or baked. Depending on the recipe, they may be breaded. Despite the name of the dish, city chicken almost never contains chicken.

== History ==
A similar dish once known as "mock chicken" was described as early as 1908. The first references to city chicken appeared in newspapers and cookbooks just prior to and during the Depression Era in a few cities such as Pittsburgh. City chicken is typically a makeshift drumstick fashioned from meat scraps by skewering them. It was a working-class food item. During the Depression, cooks used pork or veal because it was then cheaper than chicken in many cities, especially meat packing centers such as Detroit, Cincinnati, Cleveland, Louisville, and Pittsburgh, where such cuts were more readily available than chicken.

Sometimes cooks would grind the meat and use a drumstick-shaped mold to form the ground meat around a skewer. One such mold, manufactured by AMPCO/BKI, was labeled chicken sans volaille (without poultry).

The dish is still popular in the Binghamton, New York, area. In fact, a 1926 article from a Binghamton newspaper gave the dish its present name.

== Distribution ==
The dish is popular in cities throughout the central and eastern Great Lakes region of Ohio and Michigan as well as the northeastern Appalachian regions of Pennsylvania and Upstate New York, and at least as far south and west as Louisville, Kentucky. City chicken is commonly found in the metropolitan areas of Cincinnati, Cleveland, Detroit, Binghamton, Erie, Pittsburgh, Buffalo and Scranton, hence, the dish's "urban" title. In Canada, it is quite popular in the ethnic Ukrainian regions of the west, and the deli-counter version is popular in the Ottawa Valley and Kitchener area.

== Variations ==
While preparations regionally vary, pork is typically the base meat used in most versions of the recipe. Pittsburgh-area city chicken is almost always breaded and usually baked, while in Binghamton, New York, the meat is marinated, battered and then deep fried. The Cleveland version is generally baked without breading and instead the meat is dredged in flour, browned in a pan, then finished in the oven, and served with gravy. Grocery stores sell city chicken in both the Greater Cleveland area and the Pittsburgh metropolitan area. In the Detroit metropolitan area, since the early 1900s, wooden skewers with chunks or wrapped pork, veal, and lamb has been specifically prepared as city chicken. In Ottawa, Ontario, Canada, at least one variation involves skewers of three kinds of meat: pork, veal, and beef. Another Canadian variation, from Saskatoon, Saskatchewan, was composed entirely of veal.

In Cincinnati, the dish appeared on the 1933 lunch menu of upscale La Normandie as baked city chicken "en brochette".

In 1940, Crisco ran national ads featuring a recipe for city chicken, which gave the dish "some national traction", according to Keith Pandolfini writing in the Cincinnati Enquirer.

== See also ==
- Chicken-fried steak
- Chislic
- Kebab
- Kushikatsu
- Souvlaki
- Spiedie

== Sources ==
- Various Recipes
- That's Not What The Recipe Says: Binghamton Bound with City Chicken
- City Chicken
