= Chislic =

Traditional South Dakotan dish similar to shashlik

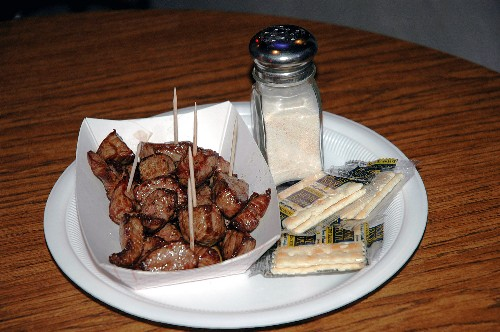
A serving of beef chislic at a restaurant in Sioux Falls, South Dakota.

Chislic (or sometimes chislick) is a dish consisting of deep-fried cubes of red meat, usually mutton or lamb, although game meats such as venison and even beef steak can be used. Most commonly associated with the state of South Dakota, chislic was declared its official state "nosh" in March 2018.

== Etymology ==
The word chislic is arguably derived from the Turkic word shashlik or shashlyk, itself rooted in shish kebab, the Turkish term for skewered meats. Chislic may have been introduced into the United States by John Hoellwarth, who immigrated from Crimea to Hutchinson County, South Dakota in the 1870s.

== Preparation ==
Chislic consists of deep-fried cubes of mutton, lamb, beef or venison prepared rare to medium-rare, sprinkled with garlic salt or other seasoned salt, and served with toothpicks. The dish is typically served hot, accompanied by soda crackers. Regional variations exist: in Pierre, the meat is battered; in Sioux Falls, it is lightly dusted with flour before deep-frying and may be served with hot sauce; near Watertown, ranch dressing may be served on the side; while Lawry's Seasoned Salt is preferred near Redfield.
