= Celery powder =

Seasoning and food preservative

Celery powder is a dried, ground concentrate prepared from fresh celery that is used as a seasoning and as a food preservative in organic meat products. Several commercial preparations exist, and it can also be made using a food dehydrator. Some celery powders are prepared from celery juice.

== Production ==
Celery powder is made by harvesting celery leaves and transporting them to a processing facility where they are thoroughly washed and inspected. The cleaned celery is then finely chopped, blanched, and separated into juice and solids. The juice is pasteurized, concentrated, chilled, frozen, and stored. After a quality control inspection, the frozen juice is pasteurized again and dried using a vacuum dryer. The final product is then inspected, vacuum sealed in foil-lined bags, and packaged.

== Meat curative ==
Celery powder contains a significant amount of naturally occurring nitrate and is often treated with bacterial cultures to produce nitrite. In the United States, treated celery powder is sometimes used as a meat curing agent in organic meat products, which is allowed per USDA regulations because the nitrate/nitrite is naturally occurring. USDA regulations do not allow artificially added nitrate or nitrite to be used directly in organic food products. Meats cured with celery powder include hot dogs and bacon. Celery powder prepared from celery juice has been shown to have a nitrate content of approximately 2.75%.

== See also ==
- Celery salt
- Garlic powder
- Beau Monde seasoning
- List of culinary herbs and spices
- Onion powder
