= Valerie Gearon =

British actress (1937–2003)

- Born: Valerie Winifred Gearon; 27 September 1937; Newport, Monmouthshire, Wales
- Died: 9 July 2003 (aged 65); Bath, Somerset, England
- Occupation: Actress

Valerie Winifred Gearon (27 September 1937 – 9 July 2003) was a British actress, born in Newport, Monmouthshire. She was known for Anne of the Thousand Days (1969), Nine Hours to Rama (1963) and Invasion (1966). From 1962 to 1970 she was married to British producer William Rory "Kip" Gowans, with whom she had children. She died in Bath, Somerset, England.

== Filmography ==
=== Cinema ===
- Fate Takes a Hand (1961) as Peggy
- Nine Hours to Rama (1963) as Rani Mehta
- Invasion (1966) as Dr. Claire Harland
- Anne of the Thousand Days (1969) as Mary Boleyn

=== Television ===
- An Age of Kings (1960) ("Henry IV: The Road to Shrewsbury") as Lady Mortimer
- Eugénie Grandet (1965), (dir: Rex Tucker) as Eugenie
- The Nigel Barton Plays (1965) (Dennis Potter play) as Ann Barton
- Persuasion (1971) as Elizabeth Elliot
- Casanova (1971) as Pauline
