= Garlic powder =

Spice derived from dehydrated garlic

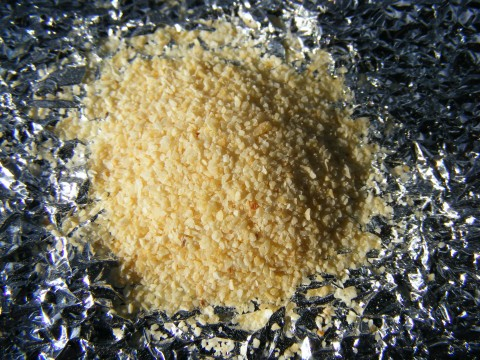
- Alternative names: Garlic seasoning
- Type: Powder
- Course: Garnish
- Associated cuisine: Global
- Cooking time
- Serving temperature: Garnish or flavouring
- Main ingredients: Garlic
- Ingredients generally used: Sodium
- Similar dishes: Garlic salt, Garlic flakes

Garlic powder is a spice that is derived from dehydrated garlic and used in cooking for flavor enhancement. The process of making garlic powder includes drying and dehydrating the vegetable, then powdering it through machinery or home-based appliances depending on the scale of production. Garlic powder is a common component of spice mix. It is also a common component of seasoned salt.

== Production ==
=== Cultivation ===
There are two types of garlic species: softneck (Allium sativum sativum) and hardneck (Allium sativum ophioscorodon). Hardneck garlic varieties are believed to have more flavor than softneck garlics, characterized by a spicy and more complex taste than other garlic strands. While hardneck garlics flourish in cold weather, due to their extensive time of vernalization, softnecks seemingly grow better in warmer climates. Distinguishing between a hardneck and softneck garlic is done through the presence of a scape (flower stalk). The garlic most commonly used for powder is the softneck variety. Due to their less-complex scent and taste, the softneck garlic is more suited as a garnish or spice in dishes and also have a longer storage life than Hardneck varieties.

Garlic cloves thrive when planted in mid-autumn in a location with plentiful sunlight. In tropical areas, garlic most successfully grows when planted in Autumn, maturing in early summer and is planted in later autumn in cooler areas, to be harvested in late summer. The larger bulbs are split and inserted into soil, around 4-6 inches apart, and 3 inches deep, with the pointy end facing upwards.

Garlic must be harvested at a particular time in order to prevent the vegetable from rotting, while also maximising the growth of each bulb within the skin. Green garlic is indicative of harvesting that has taken place before the cloves have ripened, 'soft' garlic is the term given to a harvested garlic that is fully developed, while damaged garlic, with a caramelized appearance inside, has been harvested too late and a result of frost. When the leaves turn yellow in color, harvesting may be initiated.

=== Manufacturing ===
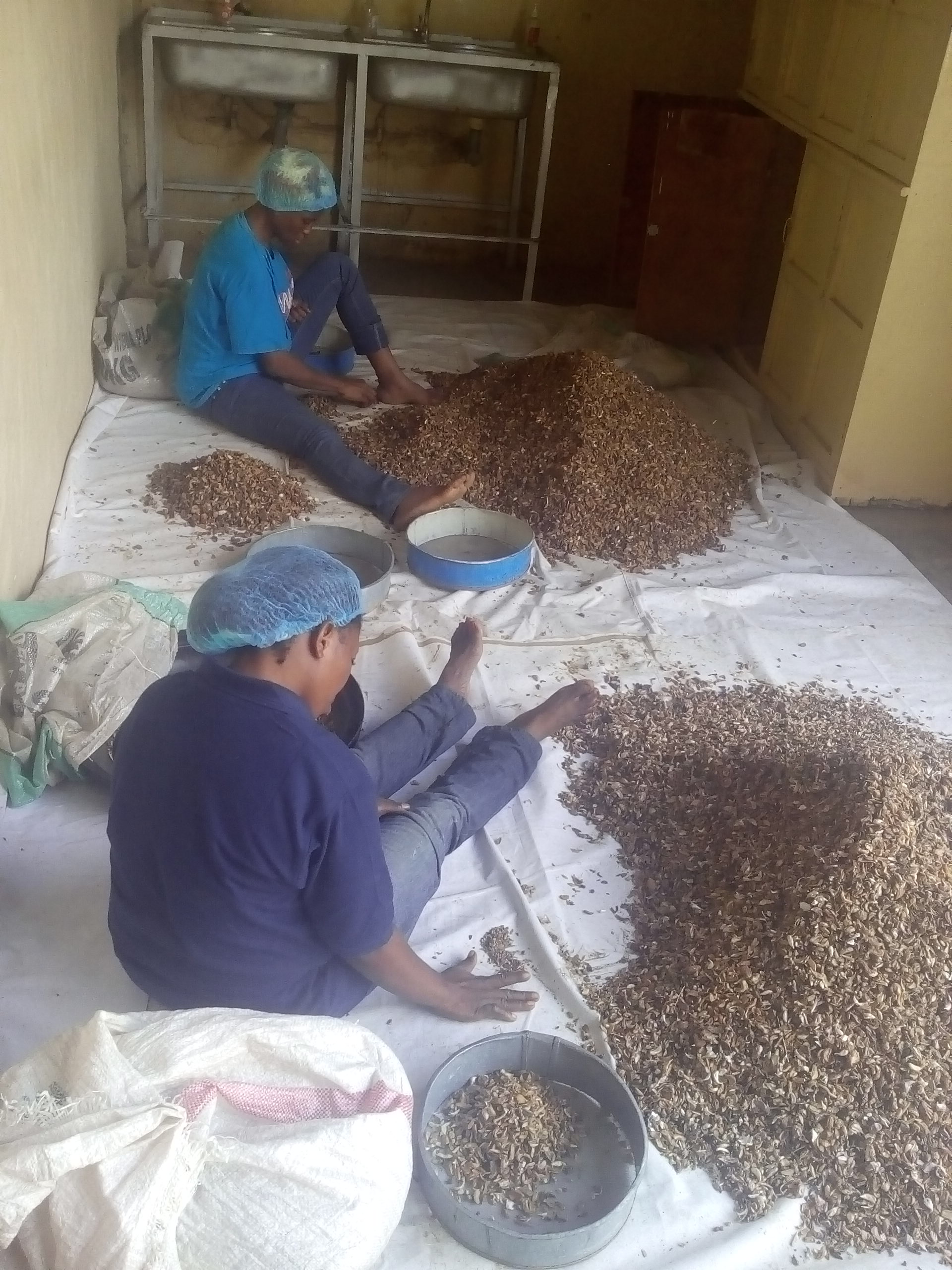
Women sorting dried garlic pods to be ground into garlic powder

Garlic cloves are peeled and sliced. In most cases, the garlic is then heated to a temperature of between 150 and 160 °C (302 and 320 °F). The water is removed to a moisture content of about 6.5%. The dehydrated garlic is then further sliced, chopped, or minced until the powder is reduced to the desired particle size.

Manufacturing garlic powder on a larger scale involves various steps, from extraction of the garlic bulbs to packaging the final powder. After harvesting the raw garlic, bulbs are cleaned under mild pressure to remove skin and separate the cloves.

The garlic is then dehydrated using both historical and newly developed methods. While old methods, such as using natural elements of sun and wind to evaporate water from foodstuffs are still utilized in many parts of the world, new technology has enabled for more flexible and economically viable procedures, such as vacuum and freeze drying. Once the garlic cloves are dried and dehydrated, they are powdered using large scale machines and powdering units.

Milling is the process of using mechanical action to break down substances through rotary cutting. As powder processing generally includes additives and is done in a bulk scale, the milling process breaks down materials to the required size for suppliers. Milling may require a series of steps, from de-agglomeration to fine grinding. The four components include delumpers, conical mills, hammermills and fine grinders.

=== Regions ===
There are approximately 300 types of garlic produced worldwide. Garlic market regions include North America, Europe and Asia-Pacific. Within China, which produces the largest amounts of garlic, there are five main provinces in which garlic is grown, including Shandong, Henan, Jiangsu, Yunnan and Hebei. As soft neck varieties tend to flourish in warmer climates where winters are mild, the Chinese provinces are suitable for harvesting and manufacturing garlic powder.

=== Market ===
The market for garlic powder can be split into multiple segments based on source, packaging, end use and distribution channels. The key market players in the garlic powder industry include some of the world's most renowned manufacturers and suppliers, such as McCormick & Company, Garlico, Masterfoods, and Amazon.

China is the largest producer of garlic powder, followed by India, with both countries consuming garlic powder as part of their native cuisines and having hundreds of their own internal suppliers within the countries.

== Usage ==
=== History ===
While doubts still remain about garlic's exact origins, it is believed to have originated in Central Asia, South Asia, or southwestern Siberia. Garlic grows wildly in Italy and Southern France, but is predominantly grown in China, which accounts for 20.0 million tonnes of Garlic per year (80% of total production). Garlic has been used for thousands of years and has served many purposes in culinary and spiritual practices.

Garlic powder (100g)
Nutritional value per 100 g (3.5 oz)
- Energy: 331 kcal (1,380 kJ)
- Carbohydrates: 72.7g
- Sugars: 2.43g
- Fat: 0.73g
- Protein: 16.6g
Vitamins and minerals
Vitamins	Quantity %DV^{†}
Thiamine (B1)	37% 0.44 mg
Riboflavin (B2)	11% 0.14 mg
Niacin (B3)	5% 0.8 mg
Pantothenic acid (B5)	15% 0.743 mg
Vitamin B6	94% 1.6 mg
Folate (B9)	12% 47 μg
Minerals	Quantity %DV^{†}
Calcium	6% 79 mg
Iron	31% 5.6 mg
Magnesium	18% 77 mg
Manganese	43% 0.98 mg
Phosphorus	33% 414 mg
Potassium	40% 1190 mg
Sodium	3% 60 mg
Zinc	27% 3 mg
- Other constituents: Quantity
- Water: 6.45g
- Full link to USDA FoodData Central
- ^{†}Percentages estimated using US recommendations for adults, except for potassium, which is estimated based on expert recommendation from the National Academies.

=== Culinary use ===
The use of garlic as a food has ancient origins in Asia. Garlic has been used for centuries as a wholefood, and as a flavoring agent.

=== Storage ===
Dependent on the storage conditions, garlic powder generally lasts in good condition up to 4 years. Manufactured garlic powders have a 'best before' date printed on them to provide an estimate for how long the powder will be in peak condition for in respect to flavor and texture. Garlic powder must be stored in a cool, dry place, to avoid clumping of the powder. If powder is exposed to moisture or heat, it could cause the product to harden or clump.

== Composition and nutrition ==
Garlic powder is 73% carbohydrates (including 9% dietary fiber), 17% protein, 1% fat, and 6% water (table). In a reference amount of 100 g (3.5 oz), garlic powder supplies 331 calories, and is a moderate-to-rich source (higher than 10% of the Daily Value, DV) of several B vitamins and dietary minerals (table).

== See also ==
- Celery powder
- Garlic oil
- Onion powder
- Garlic salt
- Spices
