= Pat Kirkham =

- Occupations: Author, Professor

Pat Kirkham is an author, professor, and design historian. She holds a Ph.D. from the University of London and is considered a foremost expert on the history of design, film, gender, and class. She is perhaps best known as the author (with Jennifer Bass) of the first major book about designer Saul Bass, the monograph Saul Bass: A Life in Film and Design.

== Early life ==
Pat Kirkham attended the University of Leeds, where she studied history and achieved a B.A. with first class honors, and the University of London, where she wrote a dissertation about the history of furniture making in London from 1700 to 1870 and earned a Ph.D.

== Professor ==
She began her academic career in 1970 at De Montfort University in Leicester, UK, where she held the successive positions of lecturer, professor, and provost. From 1970 to 1978, she was a lecturer and senior lecturer, teaching the history of architecture and design. From 1978 to 1993, she held the role of principal lecturer, teaching history of art, design, and film. From 1993 to 1996, she was a professor of design history as well as the Personal Chair and Provost for the School of Humanities.

From 1996 to 2000, Kirkham was a visiting professor at the Southampton Institute in Southampton, England.

== Author ==
She is author of several books including You Tarzan: Masculinity, Movies, and Men (1993) (with Janet Thumim), Me Jane: Masculinity, Movies, and Women (1995) (with Janet Thumim), The Gendered Object (1996), Charles and Ray Eames: Designers of the Twentieth Century (1998), Women Designers in the USA, 1900–2000: Diversity and Difference (2000), The Beauty of Life: William Morris & the Art of Design (2003) (with Diane Waggoner), Saul Bass: A Life in Film and Design (2011) (with Jennifer Bass), History of Design: Decorative Arts and Material Culture, 1400-2000 (2013).

Her book Charles and Ray Eames: Designers of the Twentieth Century (1998) laid the groundwork for the documentary Eames: The Architect & the Painter (2011) which appeared on Swedish television.

The 2003 book The Beauty of Life: William Morris & the Art of Design is a collection of essays on British textile designer William Morris and his work within furnishings company Morris & Co. Published by Thames and Hudson, it features essays by Pat Kirkham as well as Gillian Naylor, Edward R. Bosley, and Diane Waggoner.

=== Saul Bass: A Life in Film and Design ===
After spending more than eighteen years studying the life and work of designer Saul Bass, Kirkham wrote and edited the 428-page monograph Saul Bass: A Life in Film and Design (2011), with Jennifer Bass, Saul's daughter. It was designed by Jennifer Bass and features a foreword by film director Martin Scorsese as well as more than 1,400 illustrations by Bass, many never before published, that explore his legacy and offer an in-depth look at the creative process behind his celebrated posters, title sequences, and logo designs. The Wall Street Journal called the book "a superb guide" and Steven Heller, in his review for the New York Times, called the collection "gratifyingly complete." Heller also wrote, "Kirkham’s narrative and the informative comments by Saul Bass and his colleagues provide an essential portrait of a designer who successfully balanced art and commerce, and who remains an influence on contemporary graphic and motion design."

A review of the book in graphic design journal Eye in 2012 called it a "rich biography", "an impressive narrative and archive" and "a very personal story. The intimacy often missing from monographs on designers is palpably present here." It also said: "The design world has waited a long time for a substantial monograph on this influential twentieth-century Renaissance figure. The wait is over.″ Maria Popova of website BrainPickings.org called it "undoubtedly one of the most beautiful, inspirational, and important design books you’ll ever lay eyes and hands on."

=== Women Designers in the USA ===
Pat Kirkham was the project director for the exhibition Women Designers in the USA, 1900-2000: Diversity and Difference at Bard Graduate Center in New York from November 15, 2000 – April 8, 2001. Accompanying the exhibition was a catalogue edited by Kirkham and published by Yale University Press in association with Bard Graduate Center. The book celebrates the contributions of women designers to American culture of the 20th century. Examples of work range from textiles and ceramics to furniture and fashion, featuring the achievements of women of various ethnic and cultural groups from well-known designers such as Ray Eames, Donna Karan, and Florence Knoll to less well-known compatriots.

The design for the catalogue also aimed to reflect the values of the exhibition and highlight the contributions of women. The book is set in a typeface designed by typography designer Zuzana Licko, bears a cover designed by book designer Carol Devine Carson, and features an interior timeline created by Deborah Sussman, Jennifer Stoller, and Ana Llorente-Thurik of Sussman/Prezja. The book was designed by Ellen Lupton and Patrick Seymour.

== See also ==
- Motion graphics
- Film title design
- Saul Bass
