= Beau Monde seasoning =

Seasoning mixture made of salt and powder

Beau Monde seasoning is a seasoning mixture. Basic versions are composed of salt, onion powder and celery powder. Some versions include additional ingredients such as garlic, cloves, bay leaf, nutmeg, allspice, mace and others. The company Spice Islands manufactures a version of the seasoning and owns the trademark to the name.

In French, beau monde means "beautiful world".

== Origins ==
The origin of Beau Monde seasoning appears to be uncertain.

== In popular culture ==
Ernest Hemingway's hamburger recipe used Beau Monde seasoning as an ingredient in the meat mixture.

== See also ==
- List of culinary herbs and spices
- Spice mix
