= Lawry's The Prime Rib =

Restaurant chain

Coordinates: 34.0678°N 118.3760°W

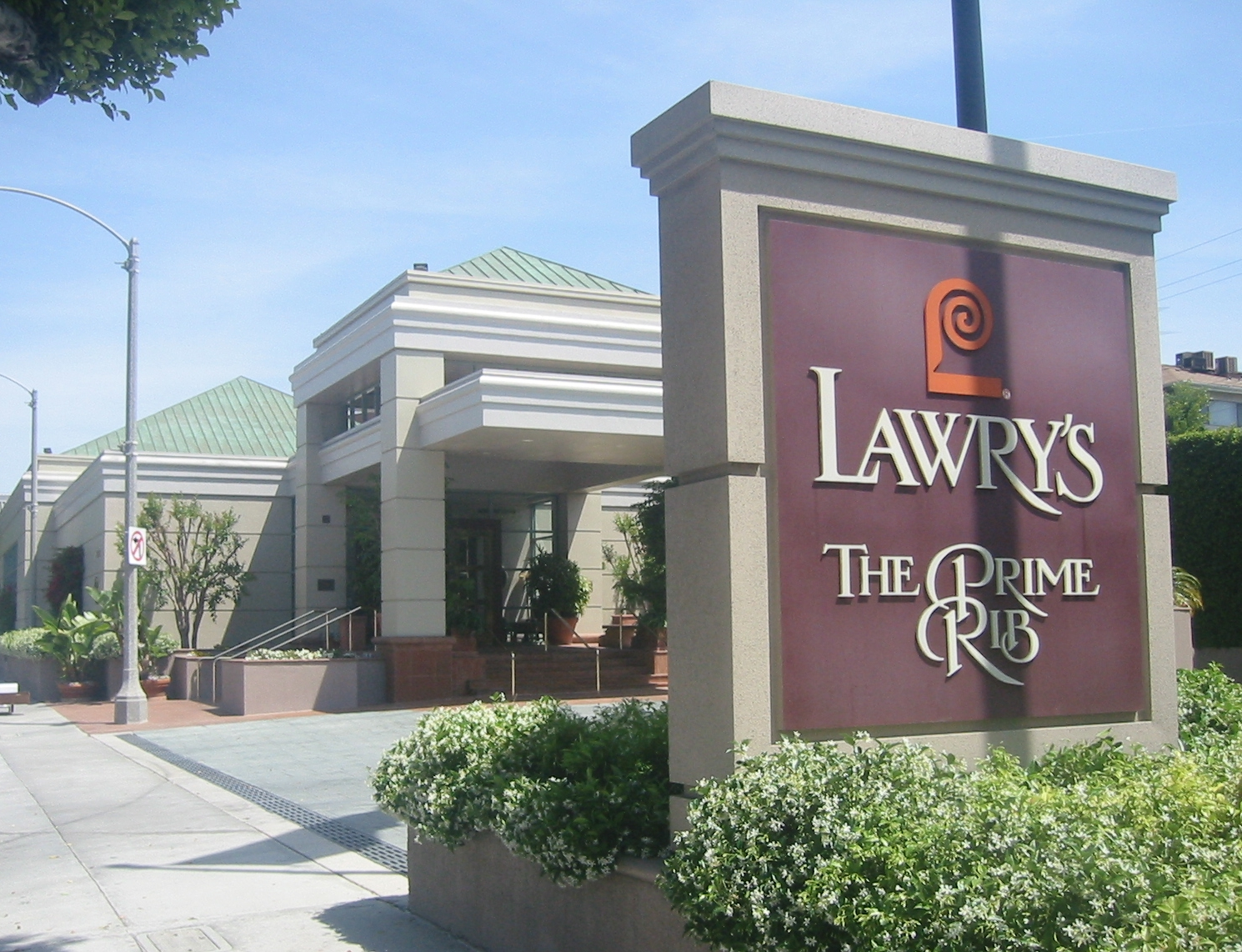
- Lawry's restaurant on La Cienega Boulevard in Beverly Hills, California. The stylized orange 'L' logo was designed by Saul Bass in 1959.
- Interactive map of Lawry's The Prime Rib

Restaurant information
- Established: 1938; 88 years ago
- Owner: Lawry's Restaurants
- Head chef: Dana Dare
- Food type: American, gourmet, prime rib
- Dress code: Smart casual
- Location: 100 N. La Cienega Boulevard, Beverly Hills, CA 90211, Los Angeles, California, United States
- Website: www.lawrysonline.com

Lawry's /ˈlaʊəriːz/ is an upscale gourmet restaurant chain specializing in prime rib and the brand name of a seasoned salt blend spun off by the restaurant founders that evolved into a food products company today owned by McCormick & Company.

The original location on Restaurant Row on La Cienega Boulevard in Beverly Hills, California, was opened in 1938 by Lawrence L. "Lawry" Frank and Walter Van de Kamp. There are now several additional locations in the United States and worldwide. The company is still operated by the families of the founders, with Richard R. Frank, grandson of Lawrence Frank, serving as president and CEO.

For many years Lawry's carvery was unique in having only a single entrée on its menu, standing rib roast. It now offers alternatives such as vegetarian specials and lobster tails, but retains its focus on carved-to-order roast beef served tableside from a large metal cart.

== History ==
In 1922 Frank and Van de Kamp founded the Lawry's company and created the Tam O'Shanter Inn restaurant in the Atwater Village district of Los Angeles, California, which claims to be the oldest restaurant in Los Angeles still operated by the same family in the same location.

In 1938, the two opened Lawry's The Prime Rib on La Cienega Boulevard in Beverly Hills.

In 1947 Lawry's restaurant moved from its original location on La Cienega across the street and a few yards further south to a larger, mostly windowless, strikingly modernistic building designed by Wayne McAllister. In 1993, it moved to a new building on the original site. McAllister's building is now occupied by The Stinking Rose, a well-known garlic-themed Italian restaurant.

In 1956, just prior to the 1957 Rose Bowl Game between the Oregon State Beavers and the Iowa Hawkeyes, Lawry's entertained the two competing teams. The Beavers were fed a prime rib dinner at the Beverly Hills restaurant and the Hawkeyes the same on the Pasadena City College football field following their practice. This started an annual tradition of hosting both Rose Bowl-bound teams, although following the inaugural event with Iowa, the Big Ten teams were served outside Rose Bowl Stadium from 1957-1962. By 1963, when Illinois and Washington both dined at the restaurant on separate nights prior to the 1964 Rose Bowl Game, the two team events had become known as "Lawry's Beef Bowl." The Beef Bowl has expanded to the Dallas, Texas, location for the two Cotton Bowl participants.

In 1974, Lawry's opened a satellite in Chicago's River North district, followed by restaurants in Dallas in 1983 and Las Vegas in 1997. Internationally, Lawry's opened in Jakarta in 1997, Singapore in 1999, Tokyo in 2001, Taipei in 2002, Hong Kong in 2006, Shanghai and Osaka in 2008, and Seoul in 2013. However, the Dallas, Chicago, Jakarta, and Shanghai locations are now closed.

=== Seasoned salt ===
While operating the Tam O'Shanter, Frank created a special seasoned salt for use there, which was available only to customers.

In 1938, Lawry's opened The Prime Rib on La Cienega Boulevard in Beverly Hills and began marketing its signature seasoned salt in retail stores. This marked the beginning of a food products company under the Lawry's name that today sells a wide range of seasonings and flavorings. The line was sold to Lipton/Unilever in 1979, which in turn sold it to McCormick & Company in 2008.

=== Restaurant menu ===
Along with roasted prime rib of beef, the restaurant is known for its Yorkshire pudding and its signature "spinning salad," introduced when the restaurant opened in 1938 and still included with every entree. At the time of its founding, salads usually consisted of a combination of fruit, cottage cheese, and gelatin; Lawry's restaurant was one of the first to feature a green salad as an integral part of every meal. The salad is prepared tableside by a server who spins a large metal bowl of greens atop a bed of ice, which is then dressed with "Vintage classic dressing with sherry wine". The salad dressing is sold in bottles at the restaurant but not at retail.
