= Invasion (1966 film) =

British film by Alan Bridges

- Original British 1-sheet poster
- Directed by: Alan Bridges
- Written by: Roger Marshall
- Based on: a story by Robert Holmes
- Produced by: Jack Greenwood
- Starring: Edward Judd; Yoko Tani
- Cinematography: James Wilson
- Edited by: Derek Holding
- Music by: Bernard Ebbinghouse
- Production company: Merton Park Studios
- Distributed by: Anglo-Amalgamated Film Distributors (UK)
- Release date: 15 May 1966 (UK)
- Running time: 82 min.
- Country: United Kingdom

Invasion is a 1966 low-budget British science fiction film, directed by Alan Bridges and starring Edward Judd and Yoko Tani. It was written by Roger Marshall, based on a story by Robert Holmes, and produced by Jack Greenwood.

== Plot ==
Driving home at night, Lawrence Blackburn knocks down a strangely-dressed male figure. He takes the casualty to a nearby hospital, where blood tests reveal that he cannot be human. Later at home, Blackburn dies from a heart attack when he suddenly meets two women similarly dressed to the accident victim.

At the hospital, which is surrounded by a mysterious force field, the patient recovers consciousness and explains that he is a Lystrian, and crashed while transporting two prisoners to another planet. Soon the Lystrian women reveal that the man is actually the prisoner, and they are his escorts. Dr. Brian Carter is killed when he tries to drive his car through the force field, crashing his car and being thrown through the windscreen. The prisoner kidnaps Dr. Claire Harland and escapes from the hospital. He takes off alone in his capsule, which is destroyed by a missile fired from the Lystrian women's spaceship.

== Cast ==
- Edward Judd as Dr. Mike Vernon
- Yoko Tani as Sita, leader of the Lystrians
- Valerie Gearon as Dr. Claire Harland
- Lyndon Brook as Dr. Brian Carter
- Eric Young as the Lystrian
- Tsai Chin as Nurse Lim
- Barrie Ingham as Major Muncaster
- Anthony Sharp as Lawrence Blackburn
- Glyn Houston as Police Sergeant Draycott
- Ann Castle as Sister Evans
- John Tate as Dundy
- Jean Lodge as Barbara Gough
- Cali Raia as Lystrian woman

== Production ==
Invasion was made at Merton Park Studios.

Robert Holmes later re-used elements of the storyline in the Doctor Who story Spearhead from Space (1970), which introduced Jon Pertwee as the Third Doctor.

== Release ==
Invasion opened at the ABC Lime Street cinema in Liverpool on 15 May 1966. It was theatrically released by Anglo-Amalgamated in the UK, and by American International Pictures in the United States.

A very brief video release by Warner Home Video was available in the UK in 1992.

The film was re-released on DVD in November 2014 by Networkonair.

== Critical reception ==
The Monthly Film Bulletin wrote: "[The] suggestion, that the extraordinary, the nightmarish is simply one step further on from the everyday, is effectively evoked throughout the film by James Wilson's restless, prowling camera, by judiciously timed shock cuts, by the use of over-lapping dialogue, with sentences half-finished and characters cutting each other short."

Kine Weekly wrote: "The eeriness of the opening scene when the invaders land and cause widespread electrical failures is well done, but the mystery is sustained too long while nothing much of consequence happens. ...The space craft, by the way, fly impressively."

Leslie Halliwell said: "Understated, effective liitle suspenser, well done in all departments."

The Radio Times Guide to Films gave the film 2/5 stars, writing: "Aliens put an invisible force field around a secluded country hospital in this endearingly daffy British oddity, which must feature the cheapest alien takeover in history. Edward Judd is the scientist battling the extraterrestrial Oriental women in spacesuits, in an efficiently made and, yes, mildly exciting slice of cut-price science fiction. Director Alan Bridges imbues the Home Counties atmosphere with a peculiar ambience that's astonishingly heady at times."

Andrew Roberts at BFI Screenonline wrote: "Alan Bridges' background in television plays and B-films allowed him to create a wholly believable cottage hospital based on what was virtually a single set, while the screenplay ... manages to evoke some usually plausible alien 'invaders'."

The Encyclopedia of Science Fiction praised Alan Bridges' direction, saying that he "creates a powerfully strange atmosphere despite a very small budget."
