= Nine Hours to Rama =

1963 British film

- Original film poster by Saul Bass
- Directed by: Mark Robson
- Screenplay by: Nelson Gidding
- Based on: Nine Hours to Rama by Stanley Wolpert
- Produced by: Mark Robson
- Starring: Horst Buchholz; Jose Ferrer; Valerie Gearon
- Cinematography: Arthur Ibbetson
- Edited by: Ernest Walter
- Music by: Malcolm Arnold
- Distributed by: 20th Century Fox
- Release date: April 3, 1963
- Running time: 124 minutes
- Countries: United Kingdom; United States
- Language: English
- Budget: $3,610,000
- Box office: $1,000,000 (US/ Canada)

Nine Hours to Rama is a 1963 British-American neo noir crime film directed by Mark Robson that follows a fictionalised Nathuram Godse in the hours before he assassinated the Indian independence leader, Gandhi, and the police attempt to prevent the murder. It is based on a 1962 novel of the same name by Stanley Wolpert. The film was written by Nelson Gidding and filmed in England and India with mainly white actors in prominent roles. It stars Horst Buchholz, Diane Baker, Jose Ferrer, and Robert Morley. It was shot in CinemaScope DeLuxe Color. The film was shot clandestinely throughout India and was banned in the country upon release, as was the novel.

== Plot ==
The film is a fictional narrative set in the nine hours in the life of Nathuram Godse (Horst Buchholz) that led up to his assassination of Mohandas Karamchand Gandhi (J.S. Casshyap). As he prepares for the shooting at Gandhi's residence, flashbacks recall Godse's hostility to Muslims during the Partition, his adherence to Hindu Mahasabha that hatches the plot to kill Gandhi, and his fictional involvement with a married woman Rani (Valerie Gearon) and a prostitute Sheila (Diane Baker). Meanwhile, a police officer Supt. Gopal Das (Jose Ferrer) attempts to find the would-be killer before Godse's assassination.

== Cast ==
- J. S. Casshyap as Mohandas Karamchand Gandhi
- Horst Buchholz as Nathuram Godse
- Jose Ferrer as Supt. Gopal Das
- Valerie Gearon as Rani Mehta
- Don Borisenko as Naryan Apte
- Robert Morley as P.K. Mussadi
- Diane Baker as Sheila
- Harry Andrews as Gen. Singh
- Basdeo Panday as Laundryman
- P. Jairaj as G. D. Birla
- David Abraham Cheulkar as Detective Munda
- Achala Sachdev as Mother
- Marne Maitland as Karnick
- Harold Goldblatt as Selvrag Prahlad
- Wolfe Morris as Detective Bose
- Francis Matthews as Rampure
- Nagendra Nath as Magin Mehta
- Jack Hedley as Kilpatrick
- Ayshea Brough as Bride (uncredited)
- Lal Bahadur as Beggar (uncredited)
- R.S. Bansal as Astrologer (uncredited)
- Ishaq Bux as Gardener (uncredited)
- Christopher Carlos as Shankar (uncredited)
- Kurt Christian as Young Natu (uncredited)
- Joseph Cuby as Chacko (uncredited)
- Allan Cuthbertson as Captain Goff (uncredited)
- Shay Gorman as Duty Officer (uncredited)
- Peter Illing as Frank Ramamurti (uncredited)
- Jagdev as Detective (uncredited)
- Harold Kasket as Datta (uncredited)
- Thali Kouri as The Madame (uncredited)
- Kunlan Malik as Bus Conductor (uncredited)
- Manohargin as Policeman (uncredited)
- Sheri Mohan as Detective (uncredited)
- Bobby R. Naidoo as Retiring Room Manager (uncredited)
- Frank Olegario as Barburao (uncredited)
- Shashi Pameholi as Young Apte (uncredited)
- Nigel Phoenix as SNS Boy (uncredited)
- Jagdish Raj as Detective (uncredited)
- S.N. Selk as Father (uncredited)
- M.Y. Shaikh as Policeman (uncredited)
- Julian Sherrier as P.K.'s Secretary (uncredited)
- Keshov Singh as Detective (uncredited)
- Rani Verma as Sita (uncredited)

== Awards ==
- BAFTA Award for Best Cinematography (Colour) – Arthur Ibbetson (nominated)

== See also ==
- List of American films of 1963
- List of artistic depictions of Mahatma Gandhi
- List of films banned in India
