= Onion powder =

Dried ground onion used as a seasoning

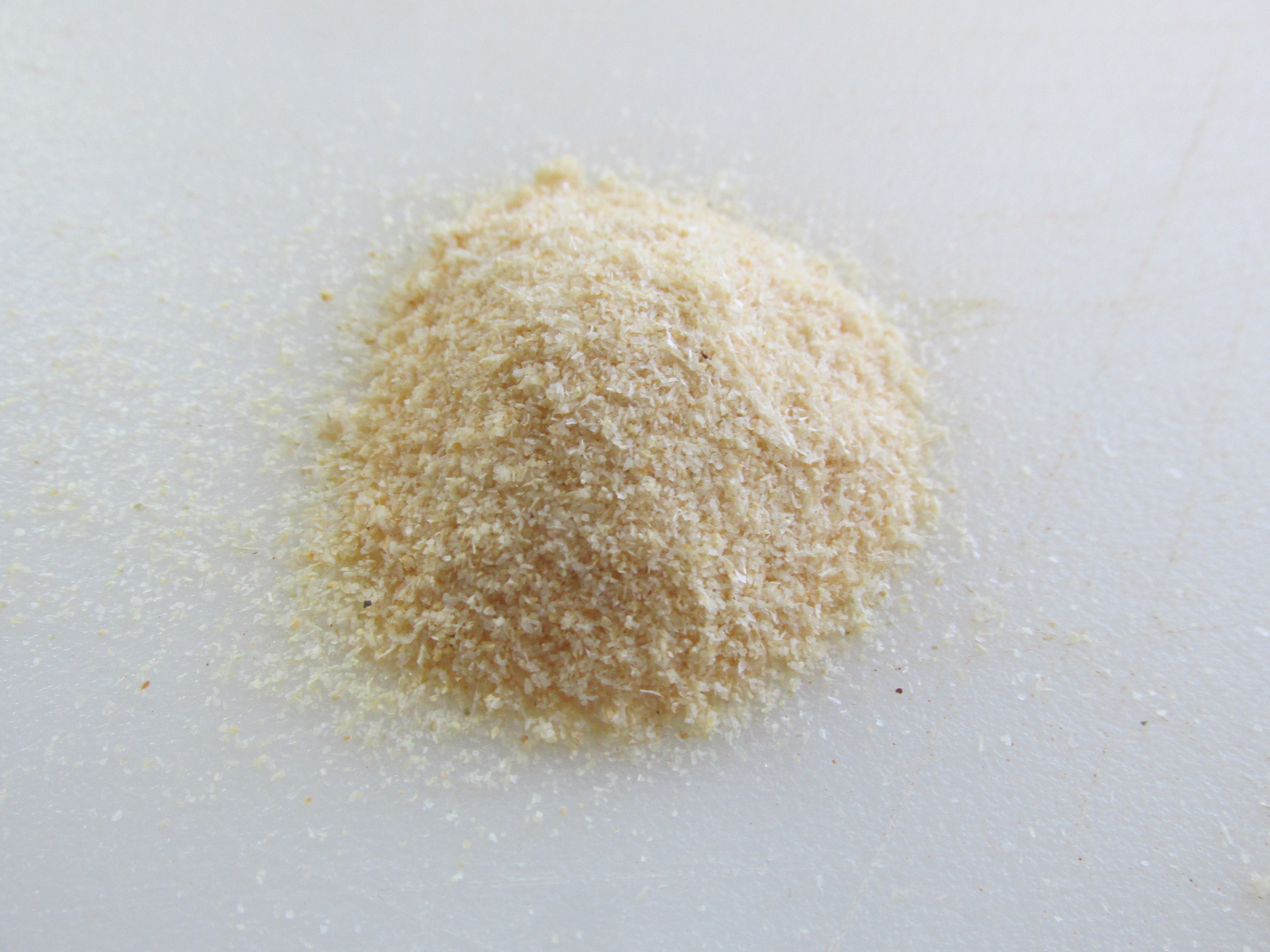
Onion powder

Onion powder is dehydrated, ground onion used as a seasoning. It is a common ingredient in seasoned salt and spice mixes, such as beau monde seasoning. Some varieties are prepared using toasted onion. White, yellow, and red onions may be used. Onion powder is a commercially prepared food product that has several culinary uses. Onion powder can also be homemade.

Onion salt is a spice preparation using dried onions and salt as primary ingredients.

== Commercial production ==
Commercial onion powders are prepared using dehydration, freeze-drying, vacuum-shelf drying and flow drying. Some commercial onion powders are irradiated as a treatment against potential microbial contamination. It readily absorbs water upon contact, so commercial varieties may be packaged in airtight containers with a liner atop the container. Onion powder with a moisture content of 4–5 percent is prone to caking when stored in warmer environments, with increased temperatures corresponding to a shorter time for the occurrence of caking. It is generally accepted that commercial onion powder is around ten times stronger in flavor compared to fresh onions.

=== Onion salt ===
Early commercial preparations of onion salt were simply a mixture of onion powder and salt. An example ratio for earlier commercial preparations is one part salt to every five parts of dehydrated onion. Contemporary versions typically utilize dried granulated onion and salt and usually include an anticaking agent. The salt may help prevent the loss of onion flavor in the mixture by reducing the evaporation of onion oil. The development of commercial onion salt preparations included formulating products that reduced the strong odor of onion in the product and on the breath of consumers who eat it.

Commercial preparation of onion salt involves the testing and sorting of onions by the degree of onion flavor they have, as flavor constituents can vary considerably among various onion varieties. This is done before mixing to produce a consistent final product. Some commercial onion salt preparations are never touched by human hands, as the stages of processing are all performed using automated processes.

== Culinary uses ==
Onion powder may be used as a seasoning atop a variety of foods and dishes, such as pasta, pizza, and grilled chicken. It is a primary ingredient in beau monde seasoning. and is sometimes used as a meat rub. Onion powder is also an ingredient in some commercially prepared foods, such as sauces, soups, and salad dressings. Additionally, it can be used in various recipes like burgers or meatloaf.

Onion salt is used as a seasoning on finished dishes and as an ingredient in many types of dishes, such as meat and vegetable dishes, casseroles and soups.

== See also ==
- Celery powder
- Celery salt
- Chili powder
- Garlic powder
- Garlic salt
- List of culinary herbs and spices
- List of onion dishes
- syn-Propanethial-S-oxide, the molecule that gives onions and onion powder their strong flavor.
