= Health Canada Sodium Working Group =

Salt-reduction activist and member of the international salt reduction advocacy group WASH (World Action on Salt and Health), Dr. Norm Campbell, president of Blood Pressure Canada said, "This is a wonderful demonstration of the government's leadership in forming collaborations to improve the health of Canadians to prevent stroke, heart and kidney disease -- three of the major causes of death and disability in Canada," says. "Here we have everyone working together for common cause."

== Focus ==
In establishing the Sodium Working Group, Health Canada included representatives from food manufacturing and food service industry groups, health-focused non-governmental organizations, the scientific community, consumer advocacy groups, health professional organizations and government representatives. The mandate of the Working Group was to develop and oversee the implementation of a strategy for reducing dietary sodium intake among Canadians.

=== Members ===
Member	Organization
Dr. Mary L'Abbé (Chair)	Health Canada
Scientific and Health-Professional Community
Dr. Peter Liu	Canadian Institutes of Health Research
Dr. Kevin Willis	Canadian Stroke Network
Dr. Katherine Gray-Donald	Canadian Nutrition Society
Dr. Susan I. Barr	Dietitians of Canada
Dr. Eric Young	Council of Chief Medical Officers of Health
Health-Focused and Consumer Non-Governmental Organizations (NGOs)
Dr. Norm Campbell	Blood Pressure Canada
Ms. Bretta Maloff	Heart & Stroke Foundation of Canada
Ms. Francy Pillo-Blocka	The Canadian Council of Food and Nutrition
Mr. Bill Jeffery	Centre for Science in the Public Interest
Dr. Nathalie Jobin	Extenso - Reference Centre for Human Nutrition
Food Manufacturing and Food-Service Industry
Mr. Paul Hetherington	Baking Association of Canada
Ms. Mary Ann Binnie	Canadian Meat Council
Mr. Don Jarvis	Dairy Processors of Canada
Ms. Phyllis Tanaka	Food and Consumer Products of Canada
Mr. Colin Farnum	Food Processors of Canada
Ms. Jeanne Cruikshank	Canadian Council of Grocery Distributors
Mr. Ron Reaman	Canadian Restaurant and Foodservices Association
Government	
Ms. Chantal Martineau	Office of Nutrition Policy and Promotion, Health Canada
Ms. Lianne Vardy	Public Health Agency of Canada
Ms. Nora Lee	Food Directorate, Health Canada
Ms. Lisa Forster-Coull	Federal Provincial Territorial Group on Nutrition
Ms. Patti Wunsch	Agriculture and Agri-Food Canada
Ms. Charmaine Kuran	Canadian Food Inspection Agency

The Working Group has met on several occasions to establish a common knowledge base and to develop strategies for reducing dietary sodium consumption among Canadians. The process that Health Canada is following is patterned after that carried out by the Food Standards Agency in the UK – that is, no discussion of the science, but rather an immediate move to sodium reduction programs and policies. The concerns over salt are chiefly based upon its ability to affect blood pressure.

== Debate ==
There is some debate on the impact of sodium reduction upon blood pressure. The salt industry and some food and beverage producers emphasize the heterogeneous impact of sodium on individuals. For example, they observe that about 30% of normotensive individuals experience a drop in blood pressure, while about 20% of normotensive individuals experience an increase in blood pressure - the remaining population showing no effect. As a consequence, some argue that programs to reduce salt will not hold the same benefits for everyone and policies to arbitrarily promote salt reduction will discriminate against a certain segment of the population. They argue that an across the board reduction in dietary sodium may not be the right approach and the outcome may lead to unintended consequences for Canadian consumers.

On the other hand, groups concerned with cardiovascular health and nutrition emphasize the overall negative effects of high levels of sodium in the North American diet. Based upon a study carried out in the US in 1991 on a total of 62 people, the presumption made is that most of the sodium Canadians consume (77%) comes from processed foods sold in grocery stores and in food service outlets. Only about 11% is added during preparation or at the table, with the remainder occurring naturally in foods. And while the individual benefits of reducing sodium intake are variable, it has been theorized that dietary sodium reduction could eliminate hypertension for over a million Canadians, with a resulting savings of at least 430 million dollars annually in direct high blood pressure management costs (although this has never been confirmed through clinical trials). In other words, while not all Canadians need to reduce their intake of dietary sodium, many have been urged to. Moreover, theoretical estimates have projected that we may be better off because of a possible reduction of tax-supported health care.

== Disbandment ==
On February 4, 2011, the Ottawa Citizen reported that the Health Canada Sodium Working Group had been disbanded. The Group had been charged with tracking whether companies were reducing the level of salt in processed foods over the next five years. This follows actions in the United Kingdom to abolish the dietary mandate of the FSA (Food Standards Agency) the government unit most actively involved in salt reduction advocacy.
