= Sy Wexler =

American filmmaker (1916–2005)

- Born: Simon Wexler; October 6, 1916; Manhattan, New York, U.S.
- Died: March 10, 2005 (aged 88); Los Angeles, California, U.S.
- Occupation: Filmmaker
- Years active: 1940–1993

Sy Wexler (October 6, 1916 – March 10, 2005) was an American filmmaker best known for the hundreds of educational short films he made, mostly during the 1960s and 1970s. The most famous was Squeak the Squirrel. He also co-produced a short film titled The Searching Eye (1964), which was directed by Saul Bass, and shown during the 1964 New York World's Fair.
