= Lawry's Seasoned Salt =

Brand of seasoned salt

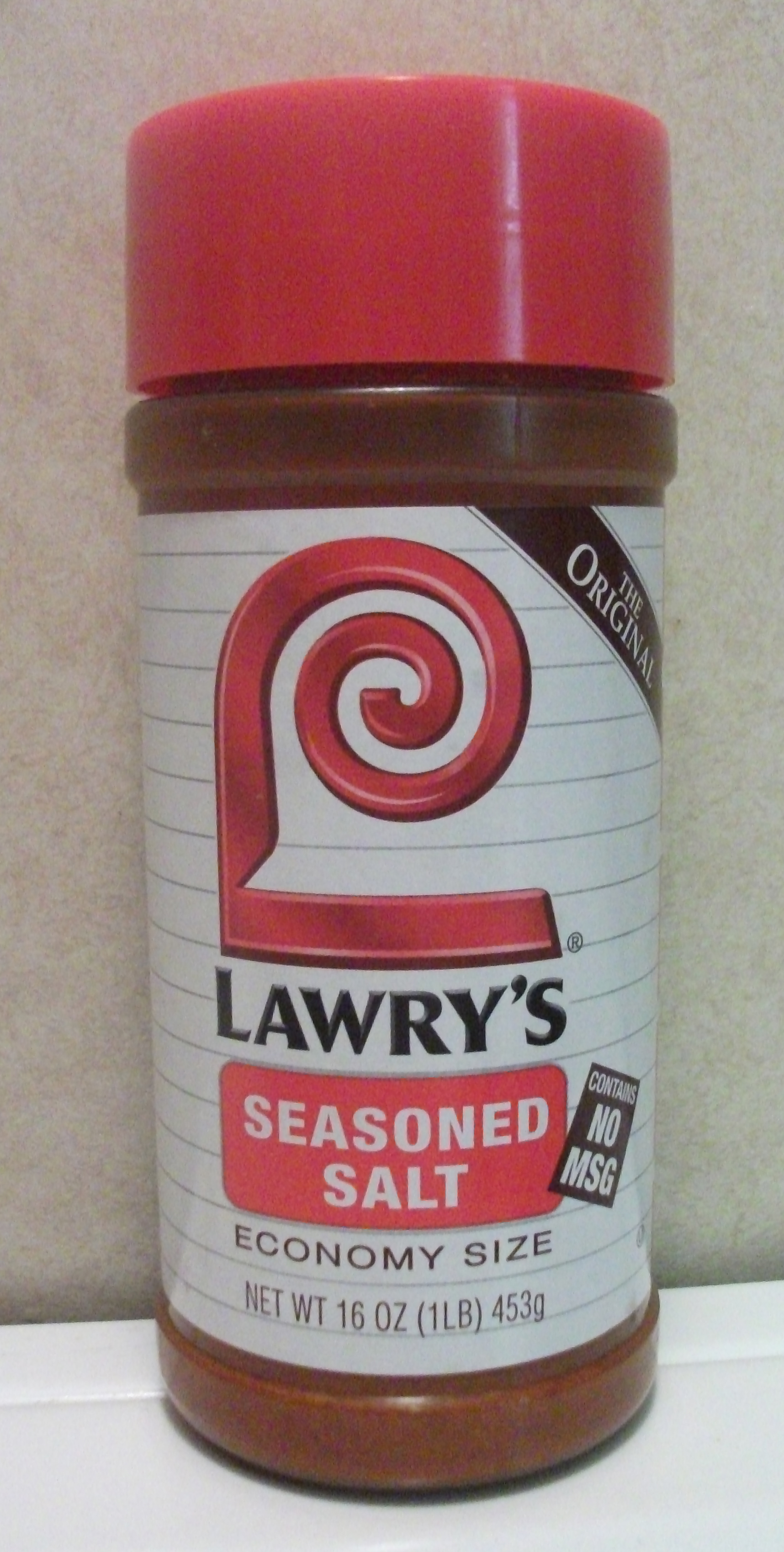
Economy size bottle of the seasoning. The stylized 'L' logo as shown on the bottle was designed by Saul Bass in 1959.

Lawry's Seasoned Salt is a seasoned salt widely used in the United States. The seasoning is a mix of salt, sugar, paprika, turmeric, onion, garlic, and other flavorings.

Before its retail introduction in 1938, it was used exclusively by Lawry's The Prime Rib Restaurant in Beverly Hills, where the seasoning was created. The brand is now owned by McCormick & Company. Lawry's was the first seasoned salt to be sold.

== History ==
The seasoning was originally formulated by Lawrence Frank, original owner of the Tam O'Shanter and Lawry's The Prime Rib Restaurant, where the seasoning was used and sold to patrons of Lawry's. In 1938, Lawry's began marketing its seasoned salt in retail stores; now many kinds of seasonings and flavorings are sold under the Lawry's name.

The Lawry's product lines were sold to Lipton/Unilever in 1979. In July 2008 they were again sold, to McCormick & Company.

One of Richard Nixon's favorite snacks was cottage cheese sprinkled with Lawry's.
