= Why Man Creates =

- Directed by: Saul Bass
- Written by: Saul Bass; Mayo Simon
- Produced by: Saul Bass
- Starring: Paul Saltman
- Cinematography: Erik Daarstad
- Edited by: Kent Mackenzie; Albert Nalpas; Cliffe Oland
- Music by: Jeff Alexander
- Production companies: Kaiser Aluminum, Saul Bass & Associates
- Distributed by: Pyramid Films
- Release date: 1968
- Running time: 25 minutes
- Country: United States
- Languages: English, Spanish

Why Man Creates is a 1968 animated short documentary film that discusses the nature of creativity directed by Saul Bass, who co-wrote it with Mayo Simon. It won the Oscar for Best Documentary Short Subject. An abbreviated version of it ran on the first broadcast of CBS' 60 Minutes on September 24, 1968.

Why Man Creates focuses on the creative process and the different approaches taken to that process. It is divided into eight sections: The Edifice, Fooling Around, The Process, Judgment, A Parable, Digression, The Search, and The Mark.

In 2002, the film was selected for preservation in the United States National Film Registry by the Library of Congress as being "culturally, historically, or aesthetically significant."

Saul Bass started thinking about creativity in the mid-1950s when he participated in a New York Art Directors Club "Visual Communications Conference on Creativity (1958). In 1966 he was hired by the Kaiser Aluminum and Chemical Company to produce what was essentially a recruiting film for scientists and engineers from the East Coast, which then financed Why Man Creates with a budget of $200,000, which eventually exceeded $400,000.

== Summary ==
The Edifice begins with early humans hunting. They attempt to conquer their prey with stones, but fail, so they begin to use spears and bait. They kill their prey and it turns into a cave painting, upon which a building begins to be built. Throughout the rest of the section, the camera tracks upward as the edifice grows ever taller.

Early cave dwellers begin to discover various things such as the lever, the wheel, ladders, agriculture, and fire. It then cuts to clips of early societies and civilizations. It depicts the appearance of the first religions and the advent of organized labor. It then cuts to the Great Pyramids at Giza and depicts the creation of writing.

Soon an army begins to move across the screen chanting, "Bronze", but they are overrun by an army chanting, "Iron". The screen then depicts early cities and civilizations.

This is followed by a black screen with one man in traditional Greek clothing who states, "All was in chaos 'til Euclid arose and made order." Next, various Greek achievements in mathematics are depicted as Greek columns are built, around which Greeks discuss items, including, "What is the good life and how do you lead it?" "Who shall rule the state?" "The Philosopher King." "The aristocrat." "The people." "You mean all the people?" "What is the nature of the Good? What is the nature of justice?" "What is happiness?" A man in a bird costume then attempts to fly, a possible reference to Icarus.

The culture of ancient Greece fades into the armies of Rome. The organized armies surround the great Roman architecture as they chant, "Hail Caesar!" A man at a lectern states, "Roman law is now in session", and when he bangs his gavel, the architecture collapses. Dark soldiers begin to pop up from the rubble and eventually cover the whole screen with darkness symbolizing the Dark Ages.

The Dark Ages consist of inaudible whisperings and mumblings. At one point, a light clicks on and an Arab mathematician says, "Allah be praised. I've invented the zero." at which point his colleague responds, "What?" and he says "Nothing, nothing." Next come cloistered monks who sing in Gregorian Chant: "What is the shape of the Earth? Flat. What happens when you get to the edge? You fall off. Does the earth move? Never."

Finally the scene brightens and shows a stained glass window. Various scientists open stained glass doors and say things such as, "The Earth moves." "The Earth is round." "The blood circulates." "There are worlds smaller than ours." "There are worlds larger than ours." Each time one opens a door, a large, hairy arm slams the door shut. Finally, the stained glass breaks in the wake of the new enlightenment.

Next, Michelangelo and da Vinci are depicted. The steam engine is invented, and gears and belts begin to cover everything. The light bulb and steam locomotive are created. Darwin is referred to as two men hit each other with their canes arguing whether man is an animal. The telegraph is invented and psychology created. Next, a small creature hops across the screen saying, "I'm a bug, I'm a germ, I'm a bug, I'm a germ... [indrawn breath] Louis Pasteur. I'm not a bug, I'm not a germ..." The musicians Tchaikovsky and Beethoven are depicted. Alfred Nobel invents dynamite.

Next, the cartooning shows the great speeches and documents on government and society from the American Revolution onward with quotes such as, "All men are created equal...", "Life, liberty and the pursuit of happiness", "And the government, by the people,...", etc. and ends with "One world."

Finally, the building stops and the Wright brothers' plane lands on top of it. It is quickly covered in more advanced planes, in cars, in televisions, and finally in early computers. At the top is a radioactive atom which envelops a man in smoke. The edifice ends with that man yelling, "Help."

Fooling Around displays a random series of perspectives and the creative ideas which come from them.

The Process displays a man who is making artwork from a series of geometrical figures. Each time he attempts to keep them in place, they move and rearrange themselves, or collapses altogether on the man. He tries many different approaches to the problem. In between, there are three quotations from Thomas Edison, Ernest Hemingway, and Albert Einstein on what one has to do to solve problems. Finally he accepts a working configuration and calls his wife to look at it. She says, "All it needs is an American flag."

Judgment is a series of reactions, presumably to the creation from The Process. It displays their criticisms of it, such as "It represents the decline of Western culture...", and only a very few support it. A cowboy is the human target. A lady (voice veteran June Foray) voices a sound of approval.

A Parable begins at a ping-pong ball factory. Each ball is made in exactly the same way, and machines test them to get rid of anomalies. As the balls are being tested for their bounce levels, one bounces much higher than the rest. It is placed in a chute which leads to a garbage can outside the factory. It proceeds to bounce across town to a park, where it begins to bounce. Quickly, a cluster of ping-pong balls gather around it. It keeps bouncing higher and higher, until it doesn't come back. It concludes with the comment:
"There are some who say he’s coming back and we have only to wait ...
There are some who say he burst up there because balls were not meant to fly ...
And there are some who maintain he landed safely in a place where balls bounce high ..."

Digression is a very short section in which one snail says to another, "Have you ever thought that radical ideas threaten institutions, then become institutions, and in turn reject radical ideas which threaten institutions?" to which the other snail replies "No." and the first says dejectedly, "Gee, for a minute I thought I had something."

The Search shows scientists who have been working for years on projects such as solving world hunger (James F. Bonner), developing a cure for Cancer (Renato Dulbecco), or questioning the origin of the universe (Jesse Greenstein). Then it shows a scientist, who has worked on a project for seven years, which did not work out. He is asked what he will do next, and he replies that he does not know. (Note: each of the scientists shown was working on something which still has not been solved to date, even though each one expected solid results in only a few years. This forwards the concept shown in this session far better than the creators could have known in 1968.)

The Mark asks the question, Why does man create? and determines that man creates to simply state, "I Am." The film ends by displaying "I Am" written in paint on the side of a building.

== Production ==
Although uncredited, George Lucas, who was studying film at University of Southern California (USC) at the time, was the second unit cameraman on this film. Portions of this film also appear in the Saul Bass pitch video for the Bell System logo redesign.

== Why Man Creates today ==
As of 2005 the film was distributed by Pyramid Media. They offer English and Spanish versions, DVD and VHS versions, and also offer two differently-priced versions (one for an educational/institutional license, and one for a personal-use license). Why Man Creates was restored by the Academy Film Archive in 2011.
