= Seasoned salt =

Table salt blended with herbs and spices

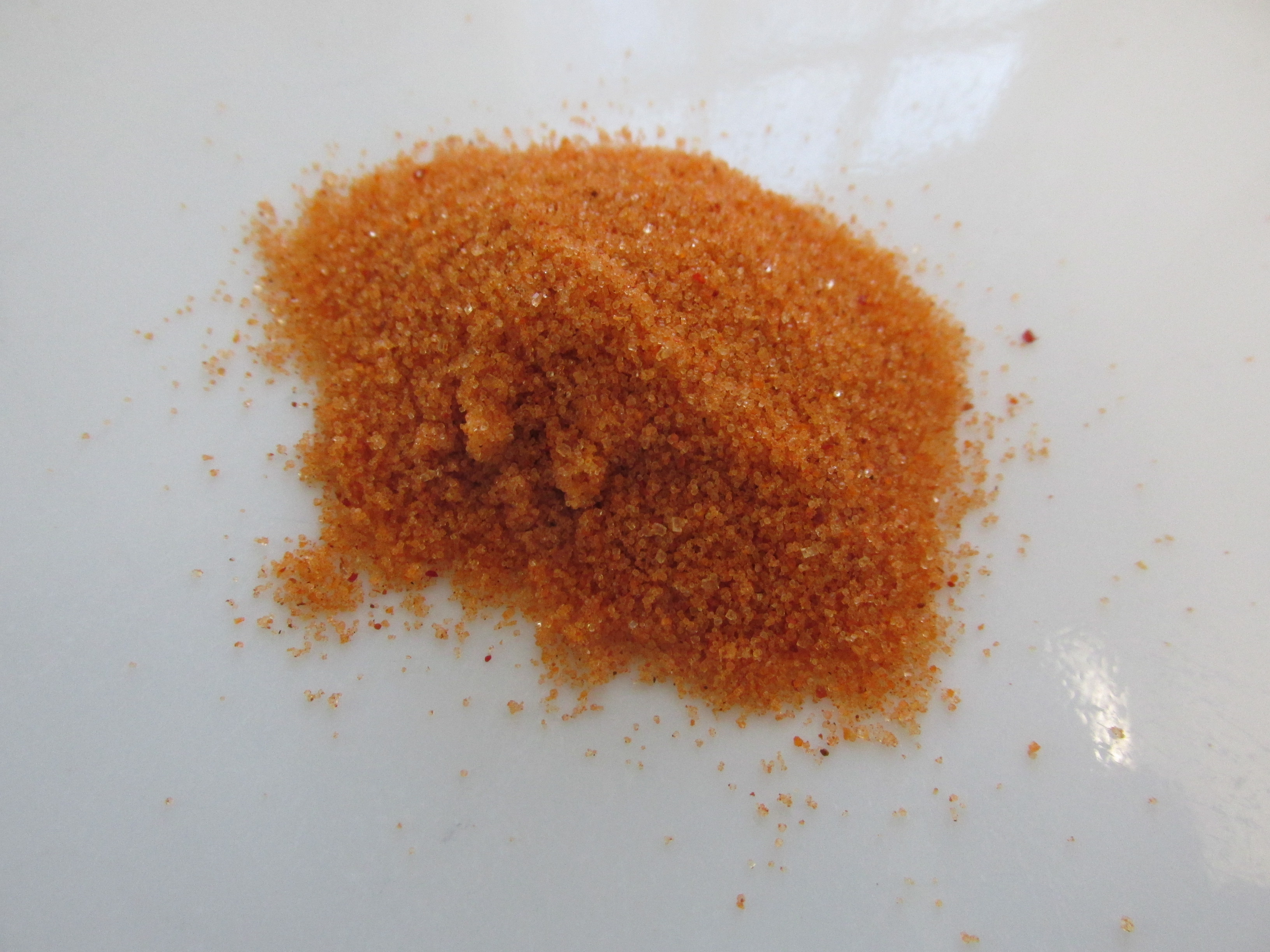
Typical seasoned salt

Seasoned salt is a blend of table salt, herbs, spices, other flavourings, and sometimes monosodium glutamate (MSG). It is sold in supermarkets and is commonly used in fish and chip shops and other take-away food shops. Seasoned salt is often the standard seasoning on foods such as chicken, French fries, deep-fried seafood and potatoes.

== Regional variants ==
=== Australia ===
==== Chicken salt ====
Chicken salt was originally developed in the 1970s by Peter Brinkworth in Gawler, South Australia to season chicken for rotisseries. This recipe was purchased by Mitani Group in 1979, and is now commonly used on hot chips (french fries) throughout Australia.

The first recipe for chicken salt consisted of salt, onion powder, garlic powder, celery salt, paprika, chicken bouillon and monosodium glutamate (MSG), along with some unspecified herbs and spices. The most popular chicken salts available in supermarkets do not contain chicken, and most are vegetarian or vegan, including the modern Mitani chicken salt; however, there are versions of chicken salt that use chicken or animal fats for flavouring.

=== United Kingdom ===
==== Chip spice ====
Invented in 1979 in Hull and claimed to have been inspired by seasoned salt used in American diners, "chip spice" was popularised in the Hull fast food restaurant Yankee Burger. The recipe is paprika- and salt-based and was developed by Rod and Brenda Wilson. A chilli-based variant is also available. The brand American Chip Spice is now owned by Wilson's Seasonings.

==== Other types ====
Schwartz sell a range of seasoned salts including salt, pepper and paprika seasoning, celery salt, and garlic salt.

Nando's, a South African chicken restaurant that is famous in the UK, sells a peri-peri salt that contains a blend of spices.

=== Switzerland ===
In Switzerland, a salt-based seasoning containing monosodium glutamate is sold under the brand name Aromat.

=== United States ===
==== Cajun or Creole seasoning ====
In Louisiana and the surrounding states, many companies make Cajun or Creole seasonings. It is a spicy blend of onion powder, garlic powder, paprika, oregano or thyme, salt, pepper, and chili powder. Brands include Tony Chachere's, Zatarain's and Paul Prudhomme.

==== Other types ====
Lawry's, the oldest commonly used "seasoned salt" in the US, was originally developed in the 1930s for seasoning steaks.

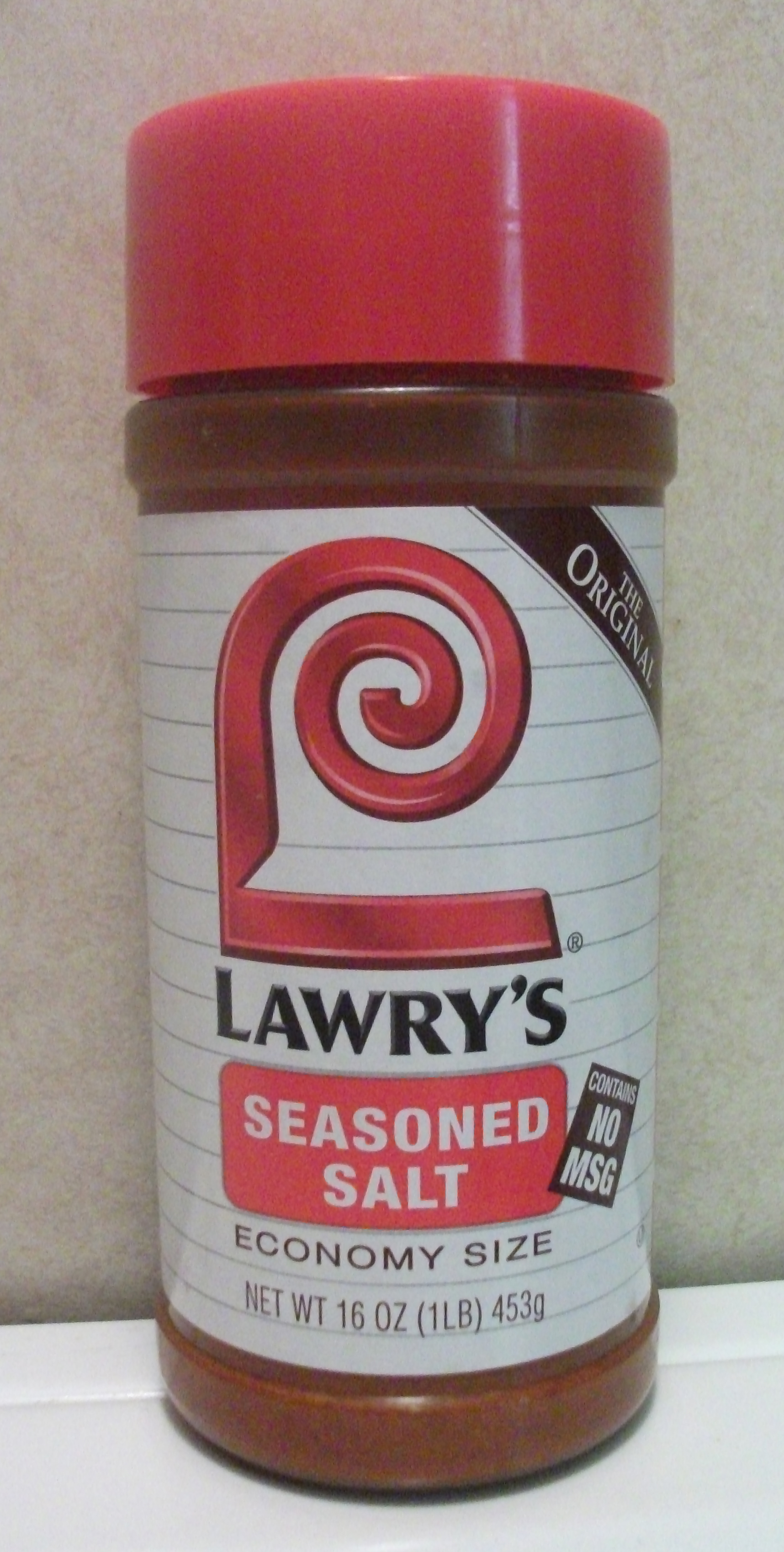
Lawry's, the most common brand of seasoned salt in the US

Morton's Season-All is the #2 seasoned salt in the US by market share.

== Market ==
In the United States, the seasoned salt industry sells US$100,000,000 in seasoned salt annually. According to the US Federal Trade Commission, two brands make up 80% of the market.

The combined market share of Lawry's seasoned salt and Season-All was of sufficient concern that the FTC required McCormick, then-owner of the Season-All brand, to sell it to Morton as a condition of McCormick purchasing Lawry's in 2008.

== See also ==
- Bouillon cube
- List of edible salts
- Garlic salt
- Onion salt
- Celery salt
- Spice bag
