= Garlic salt =

Seasoned salt

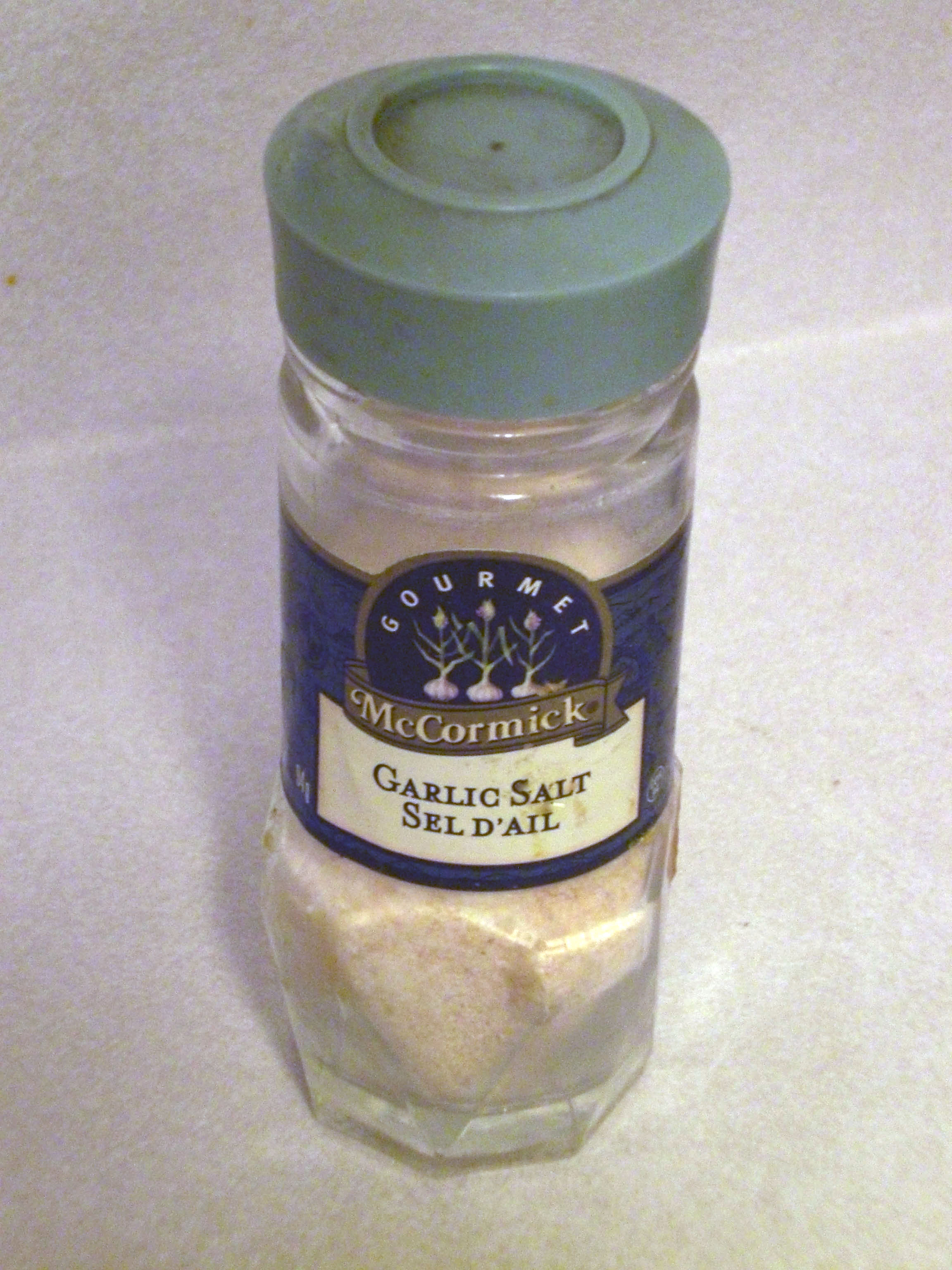
A bottle of garlic salt

Garlic salt is a seasoned salt made of a mixture of dried, ground garlic and table salt, typically with an anticaking agent such as calcium silicate. Common formulations combine three parts salt to one part dried garlic powder by volume, or six parts salt to one part garlic powder by weight.
