= Tomato beer =

Light beer with tomato juice

Tomato beer is a beverage made by combining light beer, such as lager, pilsner, gose, with tomato juice or a tomato-based mix. It is known in several countries under different names and variations.

== The Americas ==
=== United States ===
The term "Red Eye" (also known as "Red Beer") has long been used in US and Canada to describe mixing beer with tomato juice. Red beer, also known as a Red Eye, is a straightforward beer cocktail popular in the Midwest, particularly in Nebraska and Minneapolis. It combines a domestic beer, such as Bud Light or Michelob, with canned tomato juice, often seasoned with a pinch of salt and occasionally a spritz of lime. This drink is typically consumed during brunch or as a remedy for hangovers. While some variations may include additional seasonings like Worcestershire sauce or celery salt, the classic red beer maintains its simplicity, distinguishing it from more complex cocktails like the Bloody Mary. Red beer is also South Dakota's popular drink. This version combines light beer with Campbell's tomato soup and is also known as "South Dakota Martini". Within Midwestern craft‑beer circles, they remain a polarizing novelty rather than an established style, largely absent from most brewery tap lists.

Tomato Gose is a seasonal variant of the traditional German sour‐saline Gose that has gained traction among craft brewers in regions such as California and Indiana. It combines the characteristic tartness and mild saltiness of the Gose style with fresh tomato juice (often alongside poblano peppers, cucumber, and spices).

=== Mexico ===
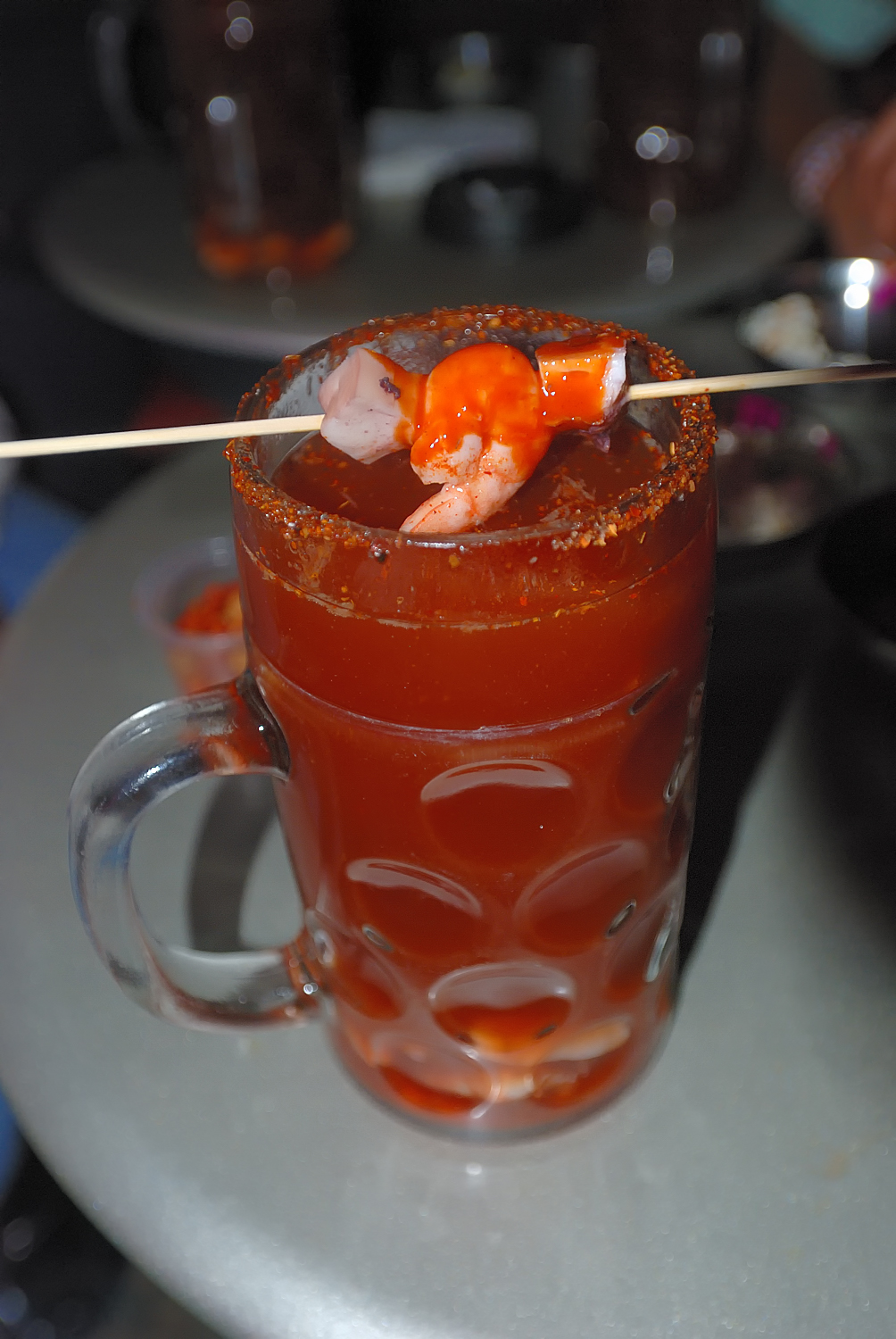
Michelada mexicana

A michelada is a mixed drink combining light lager beer with lime juice, assorted sauces, and spices, served in a chilled, salt‑rimmed glass. It blends the effervescence and mild bitterness of beer with savory, umami‑rich tomato notes introduced via Clamato or tomato juice in many regional variants. Additional seasonings such as hot sauces, Worcestershire, soy sauce, celery salt, and chili powder can be used.

== Europe ==
=== Eastern Europe ===
Tomato beer has been embraced by some Eastern European craft brewers.

==== Hungary ====
In Hungary, craft brewers have produced tomato-infused gose variants combining sour-saline bases with tomato, chili, and herbs, creating savory beers reminiscent of Bloody Mary flavors.

==== Ukraine ====
In Ukraine, brewers have incorporated traditional pickling flavors into contemporary sour beer styles, notably producing tomato-infused gose variants. First appearing at international festivals in the late 2010s, Ukrainian tomato gose has provoked mixed reactions abroad while contributing to a broader trend of vegetable-based sour beers in the country’s craft brewing scene.

==== Russia ====
In Russia, brewers have developed multiple tomato‑infused gose variants that blend the style's characteristic sour‑saline base with fresh tomato purée and a range of adjuncts. Some interpretations add chili and aromatic spices to introduce heat and depth, while others incorporate citrus elements—such as orange and lime—for a bright, sangrita‑inspired profile. Additional versions juxtapose tomato with fruit like black currant and savory notes like garlic, all anchored by gose's briny acidity to showcase the umami qualities of tomato.

Tomato beer in Russia also owes its popularity to innovations by Tula-based brewer Denis Salnikov, who in 2017 pioneered a filtered tomato Gose style that removed sediment while preserving the characteristic tart and salty profile of the style. By employing industrial separators—equipment rare among craft producers—he achieved a clear, true beer infused with tomato flavor rather than a juice-cocktail hybrid. This approach resonated with Russian consumers familiar with tomato-based pickles and brines, creating a surge in demand and inspiring regional variations featuring peppers, spices, and other local ingredients.

== Asia ==
=== East Asia ===
==== South Korea ====
In South Korea, brewers have incorporated locally grown tomatoes into gose-style beers, combining the variety's sweetness with the style's characteristic tartness and salinity. One such tomato gose was based on a gold medal–winning sour beer from the 2023 Asia Beer Championship.

== See also ==
- Beer cocktail
- Caesar
- Cerveza preparada
- Francesinha
- List of beer and breweries by region
- Mexikaner
