= V8 (drink) =

Brand of vegetable juice

V8 vegetable juice

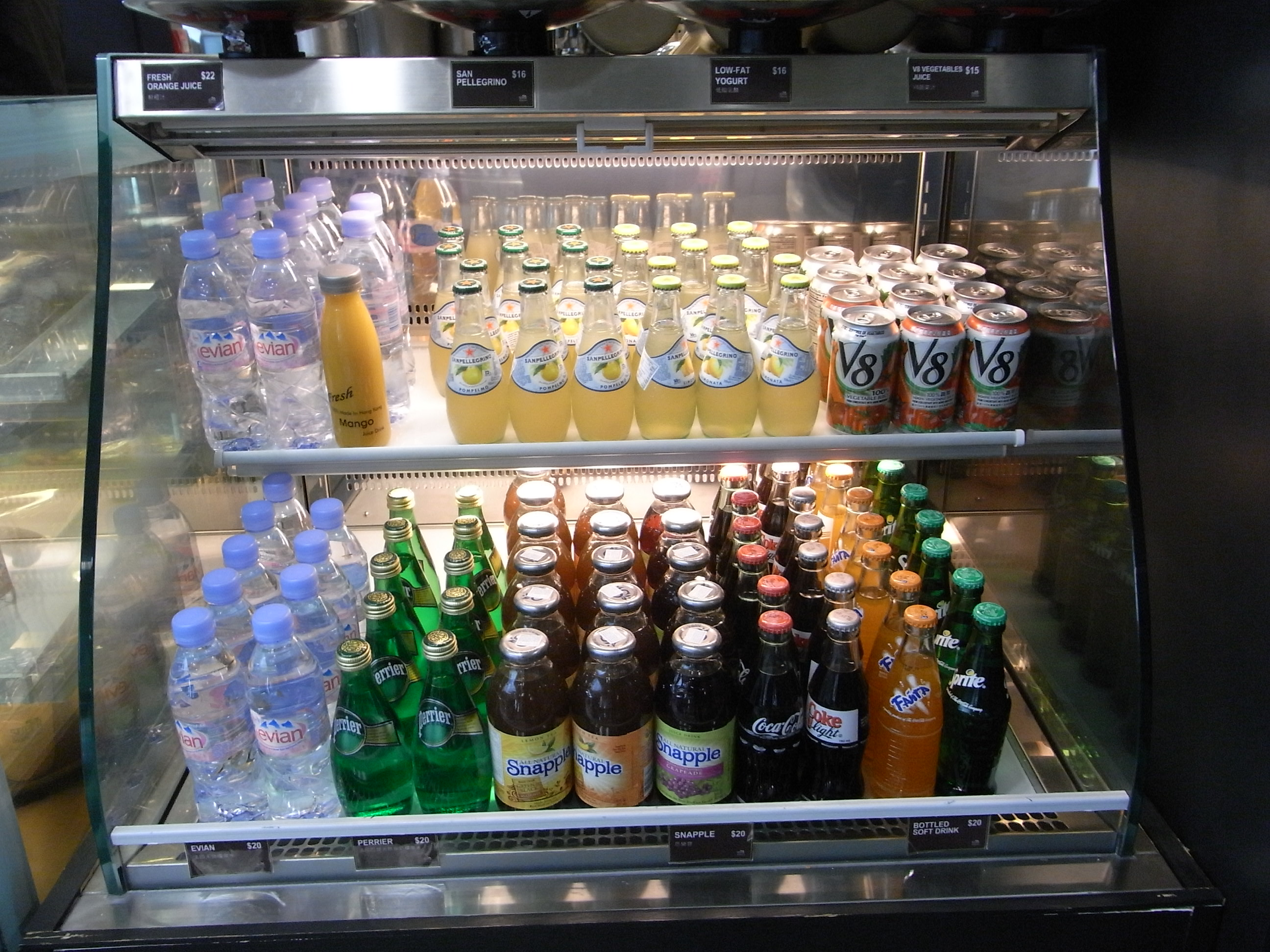
- V8 juices exhibited at a store in Hong Kong
- Product type: Vegetable juice
- Current owner: Campbell's
- Country: United States
- Introduced: 1933; 93 years ago
- Markets: North America, U.K., Australia
- Website: www.campbells.com/v8/

V8 ("V-8" until mid-1987) is a trademarked name for a number of beverage products sold worldwide that are made from eight vegetables, or a mixture of vegetables and fruits. Since 1948, the brand has been owned by Campbell's.

The original "V-8" vegetable juice was tomato-based and got its name from the fact that it contained juice from eight different vegetables. The 1941 Loudon Packing Company V-8 label gave these ingredients: "8 vegetable juices combined—tomato, celery, carrot, parsley, lettuce, beet, spinach, watercress, spices and salt."

== History ==
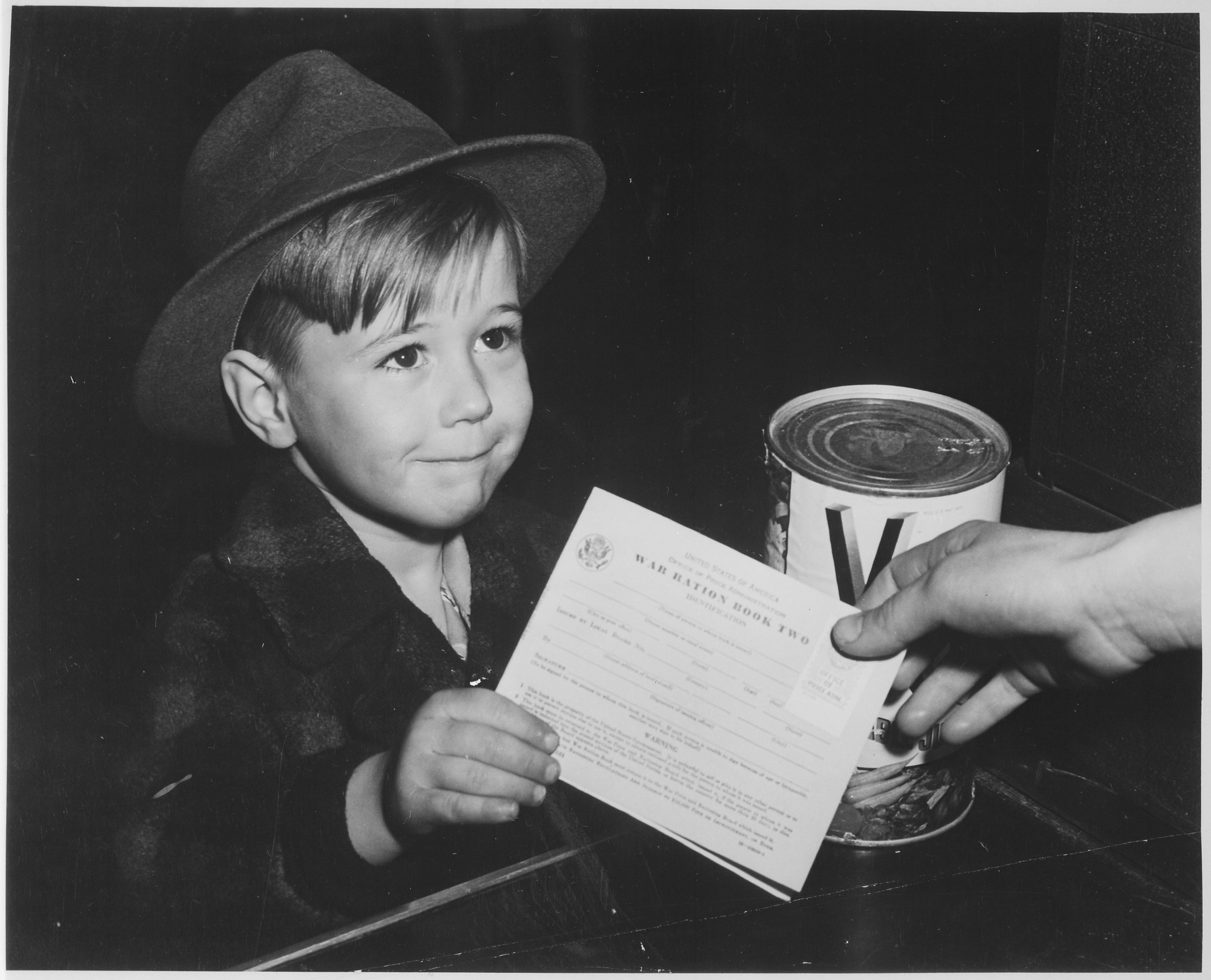
An American child during World War II (1943) purchases a can of V-8, handing the grocer his ration book.

V-8 Vegetable Juice was developed by Frank Constable of Chicago, Illinois, who worked as a contractor for W.G. Peacock (1896–1948), the founder of the New England Products Company, which manufactured individual vegetable juices under the brand name Vege-min since 1933. Tomato juice made up around 87% of the original drink. In 1947, Frank Constable devised a new formula for the "Vege-min 8 Vegetable Cocktail Juice", which remains today. The product was named by Constable after the V8 engine, available from Ford and Cadillac, an advanced design that totally replaced the "inline" 8-cyl. engines in the U.S. by the mid-1950s. In 1948, the Campbell Soup Company acquired the V-8 brand from the Charles Loudon Packing Company in Terre Haute, Indiana, and has maintained continuous production of the beverage through the present day. Among its Hollywood endorsers soon after Campbell’s acquisition were John Payne, Rhonda Fleming, Ronald Reagan June Haver, Jeanne Crain, Alan Ladd, Gene Tierney, Ginger Rogers, and Fred MacMurray.

V8 Juice was discontinued in the UK in 2023.

== Product range ==
The original V8 is a savory juice. It is made mainly from water and tomato concentrate, and reconstituted vegetable juice blend. Campbell presently lists its ingredients as follows: “Carrots, celery, beets, parsley, lettuce, watercress and spinach juice are blended to create our unique flavor. These vegetables are grown mostly in the U.S. and then driven to our processing facility in Napoleon, Ohio where they are washed, pureed, and concentrated. Salt…Potassium Chloride…Natural Flavors…”primarily derived from fruits and vegetables”…Ascorbic Acid (Vitamin C)…Vitamin A (Beta Carotene).”

Campbell's has produced several varieties of the drink, such as Original, Spicy Hot, Hint of Black Pepper, Lemon, Picante, Low-Sodium, and Organic.

Three spin-offs of the V8 brand, "V8 Energy", "V8 Splash" and "V8 V•Fusion", are blends of fruit and vegetable (specifically carrot) juices. V8 Splash is a juice cocktail partially sweetened with high-fructose corn syrup and sucralose; diet versions of V8 Splash omit the high-fructose corn syrup. V8 Energy also classifies as a cocktail and is partially sweetened with sucralose. V•Fusion is made from 100% juice.

=== V8 Fruit & Vegetable Juice ===
Campbell's also makes sweet-flavored V8 100% Fruit & Vegetable Juice, combining vegetable juice with fruit juices for one serving of vegetables and one serving of fruits. This is available elsewhere as V8 V-Fusion. They are also sold in "light" versions containing 50% juice (1/2 serving of vegetables and 1/2 serving of fruits) with added flavors to reduce calorie content. V8 V-Fusion + Tea was recently introduced. It contains a 1/2 serving of vegetables and a 1/2 serving of fruits.

Some varieties are composed of:

- Strawberry Banana: sweet potatoes, tomatoes, carrots, beets, white grapes, oranges, apples, strawberries, bananas and banana puree.
- Pomegranate Blueberry: sweet potatoes, purple carrots, tomatoes, carrots, apples, white grapes.
- Tropical Orange: sweet potatoes, carrots, yellow tomatoes, squash, white grapes, oranges, pineapples.
- Peach Mango: sweet potatoes, yellow tomatoes, squash, white grapes, oranges, peaches, mangoes.
- Açaí Mixed Berry: sweet potatoes, carrots, apples, white grapes, açaí berries, blueberries, limes.
- Cranberry Blackberry: sweet potatoes, purple carrots, carrots, apples, white grapes, cranberry, blackberry, lemon juice.
- Goji Raspberry: sweet potatoes, purple carrots, carrots, apples, white grapes, cherries, strawberries, blackberry, oranges, goji, red raspberry, lemon juice.

In Australia, the V8 range includes 100% Fruit & Vegetable Juice, combining vegetable juice with fruit juices for one serving of vegetables and one serving of fruit, in the following flavors:⠀

- Tropical
- Breakfast
- Pineapple Passion
- Apple Mango
- Orange Mango Passion

In 2015, the V8 Power Blend range was also launched in Australia; these 100% Vegetable Juice & Fruit juices contain two servings of vegetables and are available in the following flavors:

- Healthy Greens
- Purple Power
- Orange Kick
- Rainbow Burst
- Mighty Peach
- Golden Glow
- Immunity Boost

=== V8 Energy ===
V8 also manufactures a line of juice-based energy drinks, sold in individual aluminum cans. Each includes 80 mg of caffeine (from green tea) per serving and is fortified with B vitamins. V8 Energy drinks are typically lower in sugar per fluid ounce compared to its juices, with the drinks partially sweetened with sucralose; other than caffeine, V8 Energy does not contain taurine, guarana, carnitine, inositol or glucoronolactone which are found in other energy drinks.

- V8 +Energy: A non-carbonated beverage of 50% juice, available in 237 mL (8.0 US fl oz) and 340 mL (11.5 US fl oz) cans. Flavors include original (vegetable), black cherry, peach-mango, pomegranate-blueberry, orange-pineapple, raspberry-vanilla, strawberry-banana, honeycrisp apple-berry and tropical greens.
- V8 +Energy Sparkling: A carbonated beverage of 34% juice, typically sold in 355 mL (12.0 US fl oz) cans and 237 mL (8.0 US fl oz)-can four-packs. Currently produced flavors include Orange Pineapple, White Grape Raspberry, Black Cherry, Cranberry Blackberry and Kiwi Melon (the last two of which are only available in the four-packs).

== Nutrition ==
Example nutrition information for V8 Vegetable Juice:

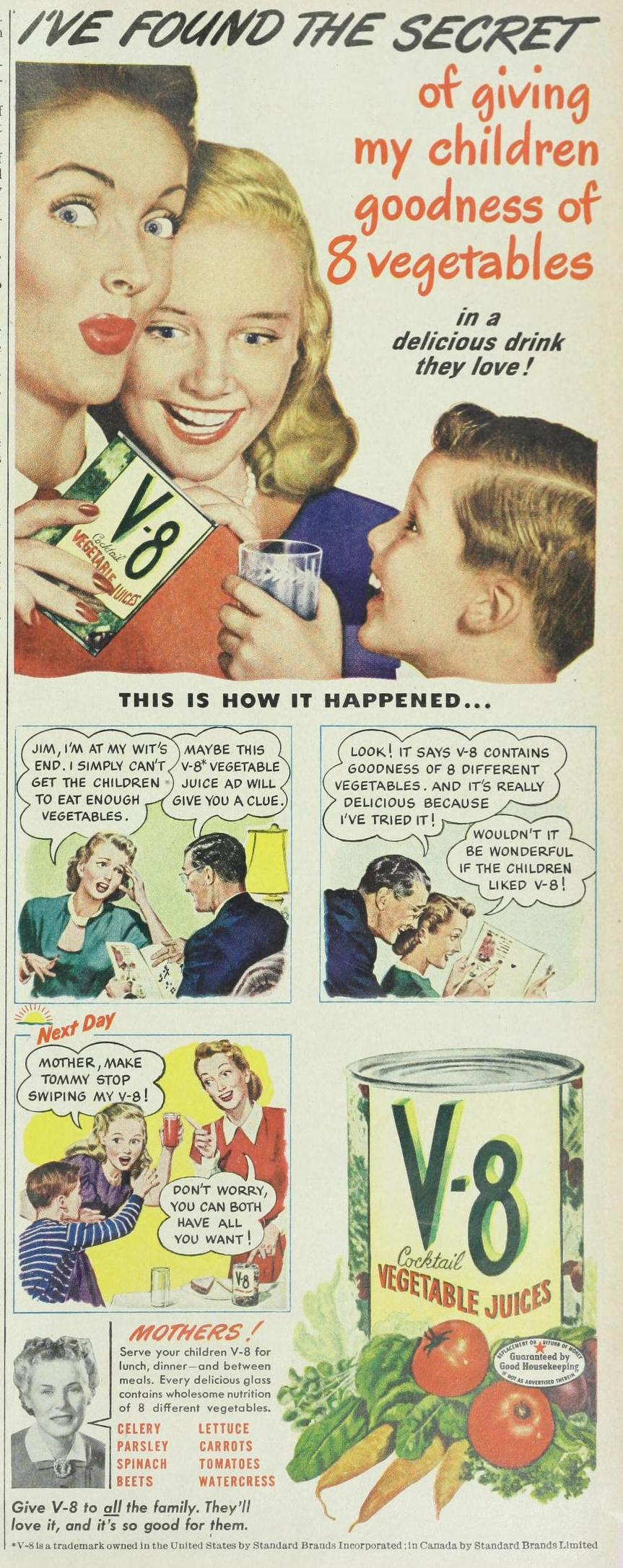
1947 ad for the product, from the Ladies Home Journal

Nutrition Data (Australia)
Servings per package: 1
Serving size: 250 ml
| | Average qty per serving | Average qty per 100 g |
| Energy | 165 kJ (40 cal) | 66 kJ (16 cal) |
| Protein | 2.4 g | 1.0 g |
| Fat | | |
| Total | Nil | Nil |
| Saturated | Nil | Nil |
| Carbohydrate | | |
| Total | 6.3 g | 2.5 g |
| Sugars | 6.3 g | 2.5 g |
| Sodium | 660 mg | 263 mg |
| Vitamin A | 325 μg (40%)^ | 130 μg |
| Vitamin C | 52 mg (130%)^ | 21 mg |

11.5 fluid ounce (340 mL) can of V8 100% Vegetable Juice (United States)
Nutrition Facts
Serving Size 1 can
Amount Per Serving
| Energy 60 cal (250 kJ) | Calories from Fat 0 |
| | % Daily Value* |
| Total Fat 0 g | 0% |
| Saturated Fat 0 g | 0% |
| Trans Fat 0 g | |
| Cholesterol 0 mg | 0% |
| Sodium 920 mg | 40% |
| Potassium 680 mg | 15% |
| Total Carbohydrate 13 g | 5% |
| Dietary Fiber 3 g | 11% |
| Sugars 10 g | |
| Protein 3 g | |
| Vitamin A | 30% |
| Vitamin C | 110% |
| Calcium | 4% |
| Iron | 6% |

== Derivative beverages ==
A few cocktail drinks use V8, most famously the "bloody eight" or "eight ball", which is a Bloody Mary with V8 instead of tomato juice. Clamato, with a taste profile more savory than V8, is also common in variations.

V8 also markets a Bloody Mary mix under its vegetable juice line. The composition is more traditional, using only tomato and lemon juices.

== Slogans ==
- "Wow, It Sure Doesn't Taste like Tomato Juice!" (1960s)
- "Drink V8 & Keep Your Diet Straight!" (1990s–present)
- "Drink Smarter with V8." (2000–present)
- "Drink It. Feel It." (2003–2004)
- "Should've Had a V8." (1970s-1980s, 2009–present) ("Could've Had a V8." used in tandem)
- "Veg up." (present)

== See also ==
- List of juices
