= Michelada =

Mexican drink made with beer, lime juice, assorted sauces, and spices

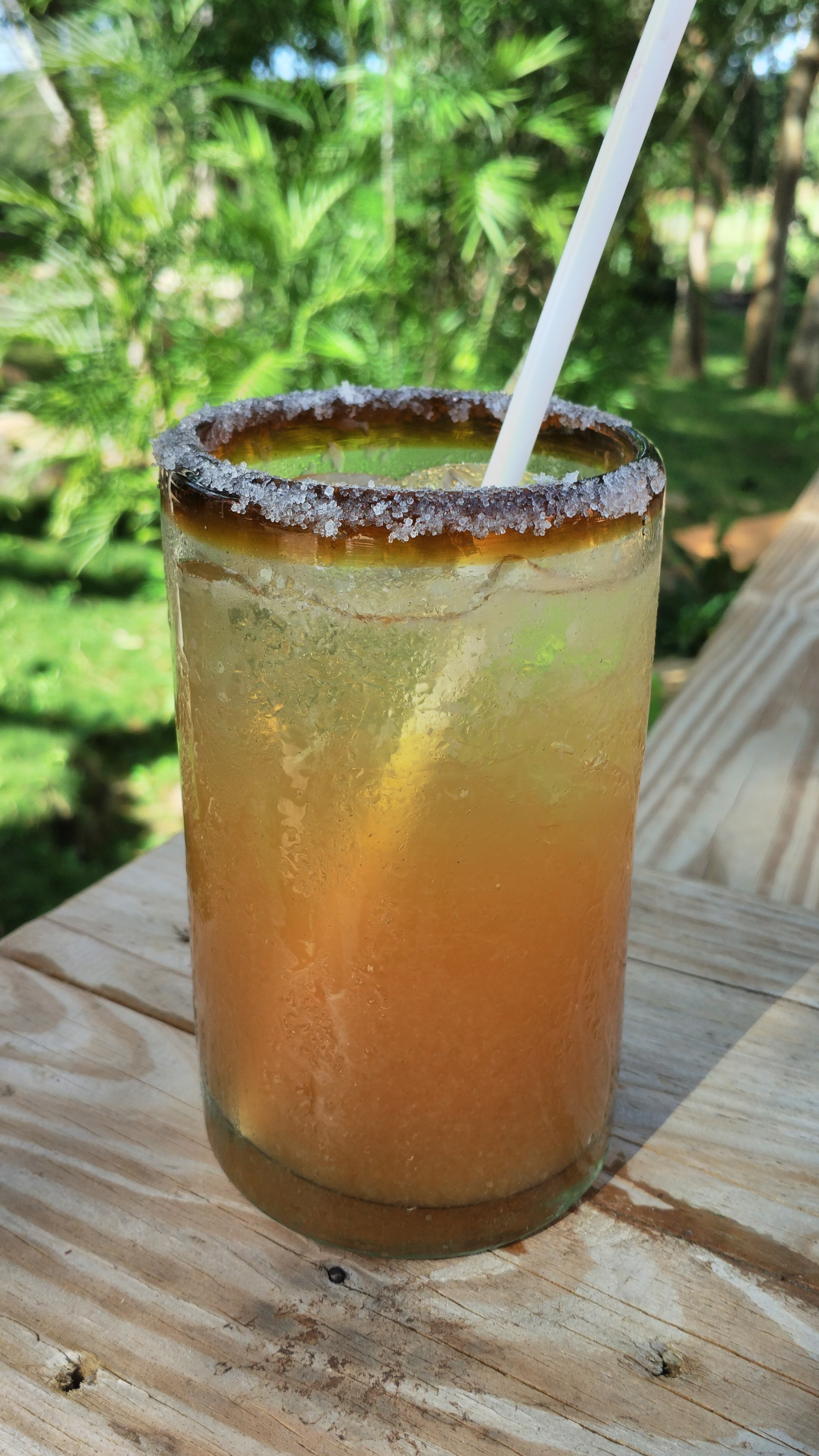
- Michelada in a salt-rimmed glass
- Base spirit: Beer
- Standard drinkware: Pint glass
- Standard garnish: Lime
- Served: In a chilled, salt-rimmed glass

A michelada (Spanish pronunciation: [mitʃeˈlaða]) is a Mexican drink made with beer, lime juice, assorted sauces (often chili-based), spices, and chili peppers. It is served in a chilled, salt-rimmed glass. There are numerous variations of this beverage throughout Mexico.

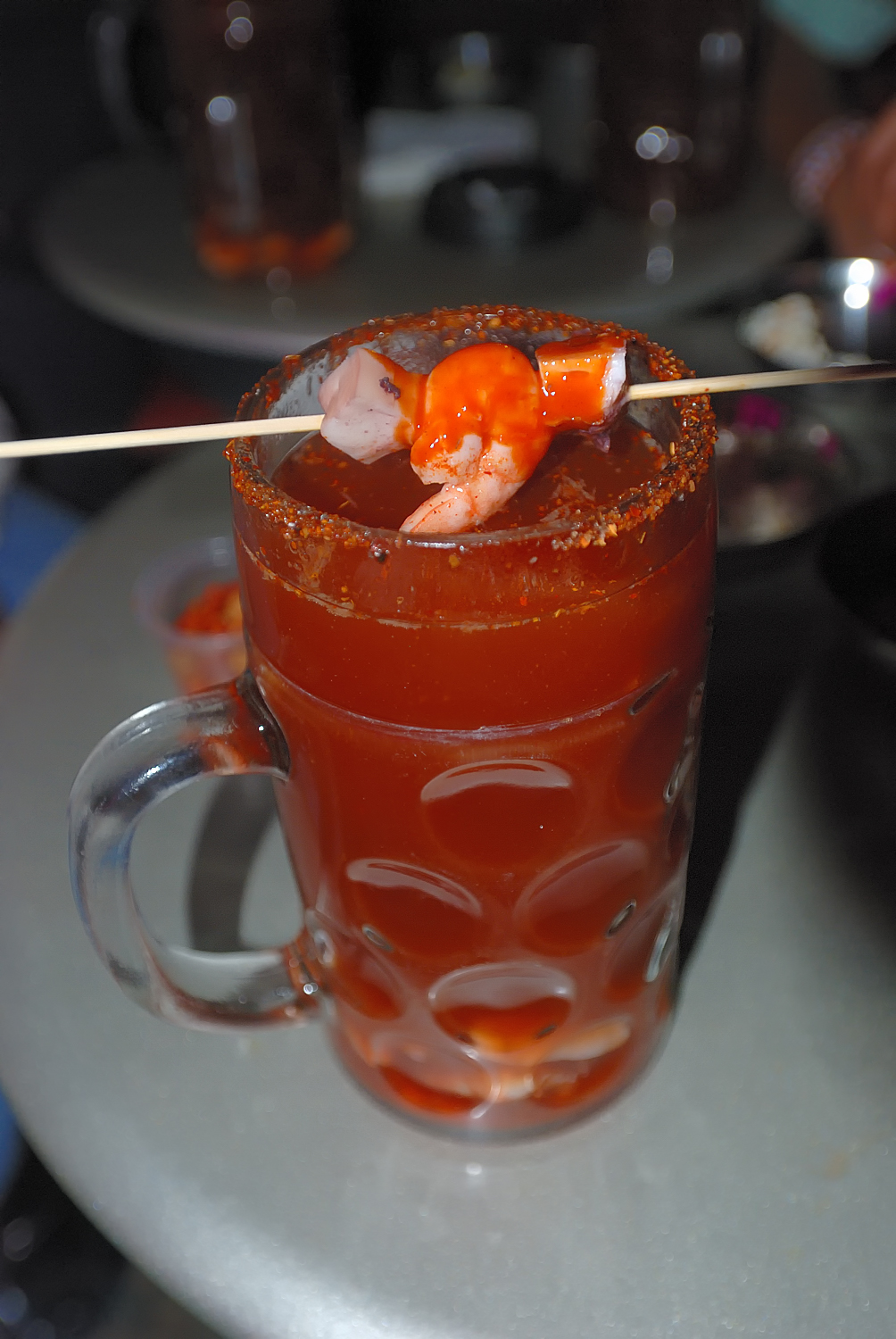
A michelada

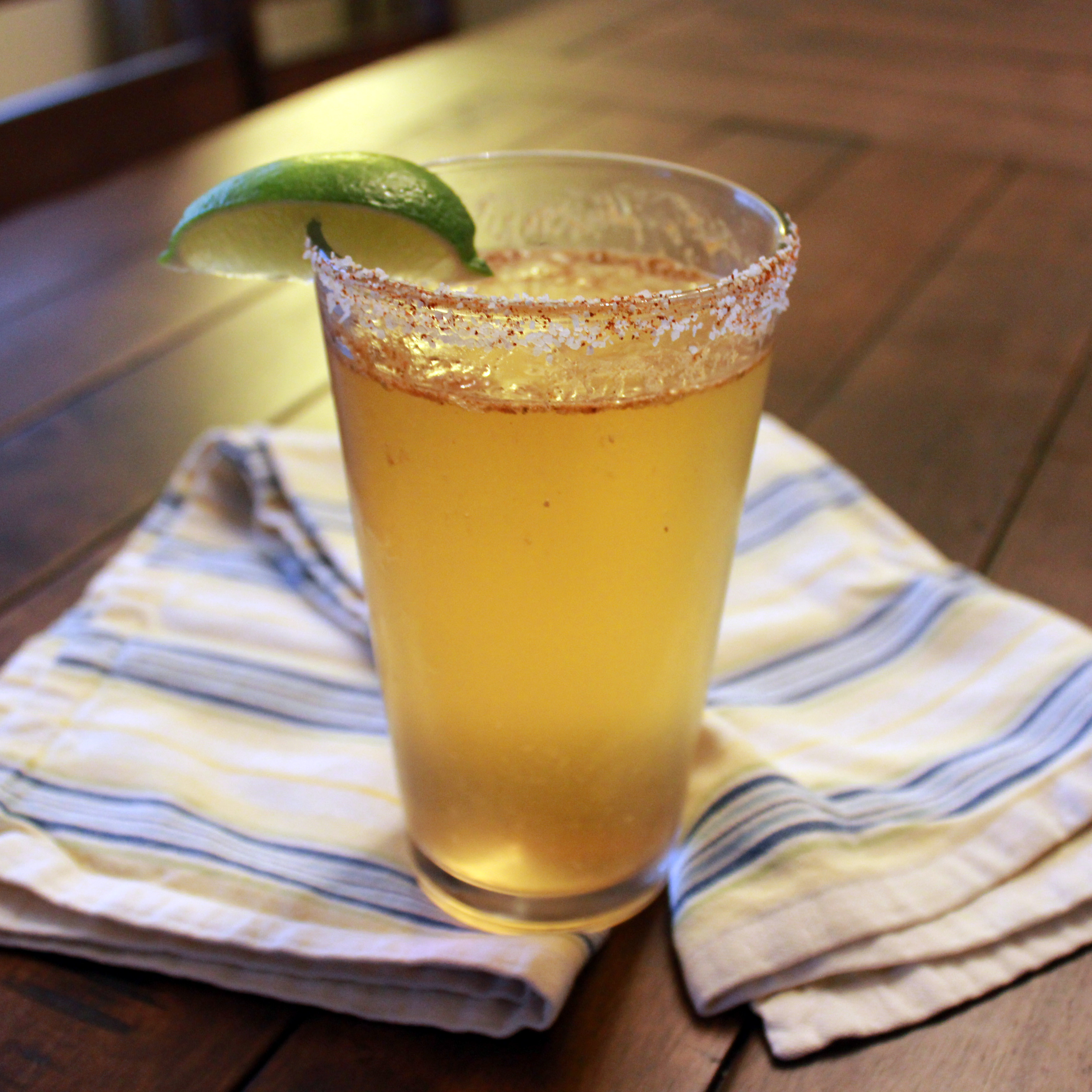
A michelada made with Mexican lager beer, lime juice, Worcestershire sauce, celery salt, black pepper, hot sauce, and garnished with salt, cayenne pepper, and a lime wedge

In Mexico City, the most common form is prepared with beer, lime, salt, and particular hot sauces or chile slices. There are several other optional ingredients, such as Maggi sauce, soy sauce, Tajín, Worcestershire sauce, chamoy powder, serrano peppers, or clamato.

== Origin ==
There are two popular versions of the origin and etymology of the michelada.

One involves a man named Michel Ésper at Club Deportivo Potosino in San Luis Potosí. In the 1960s, Ésper began to ask for his beer with lime, salt, ice, and a straw, in a cup called "chabela", as if it were a beer lemonade (limonada). Members of the club started asking for beer as "Michel's lemonade", with the name shortening over time to Michelada. As time went by, other sauces were added to the original recipe. Today, it contains the same ingredients as a chelada, but contains ice and chili powder on the rim.

Another etymology states that michelada is a portmanteau of mi chela helada. The word chela is a popular term for a cold beer in Mexico; therefore the phrase mi chela helada means "my ice-cold beer".

== Commercialization ==
In the 2010s, major U.S. beer producers began marketing cervezas preparadas, illustrating the wide variety of recipes in the chelada/michelada category and acknowledging its popularity among the country's Latin American population, along with the increasing popularity of the drink outside of the Latin American population.

In 2007, Miller Brewing Company began producing Miller Chill, a "Chelada-style light lager with a hint of salt and lime". Anheuser-Busch makes Budweiser Chelada and Bud Light Chelada, a combination of lager, clamato, lime juice, and salt. In 2012, Tecate began offering a michelada flavored with lime and spices. In 2015, Cervecería Centro Americana, a Guatemalan Brewery, released a Michelada under the trade name Dorada Draft Michelada Chiltepe. The beverage is spiced with chiltepe peppers, a small, fiery pepper popular in Central American cuisine. Since August 2022, Modelo has offered a wide variety of Michelada-flavored beers in the US.

== See also ==
- Beer cocktail
- Bloody Mary (cocktail)
- Caesar (cocktail)
- Queen Mary (cocktail)
- Shandy
- Spaghett
- Tomato beer
