= Vampiro (cocktail) =

Tequila cocktail

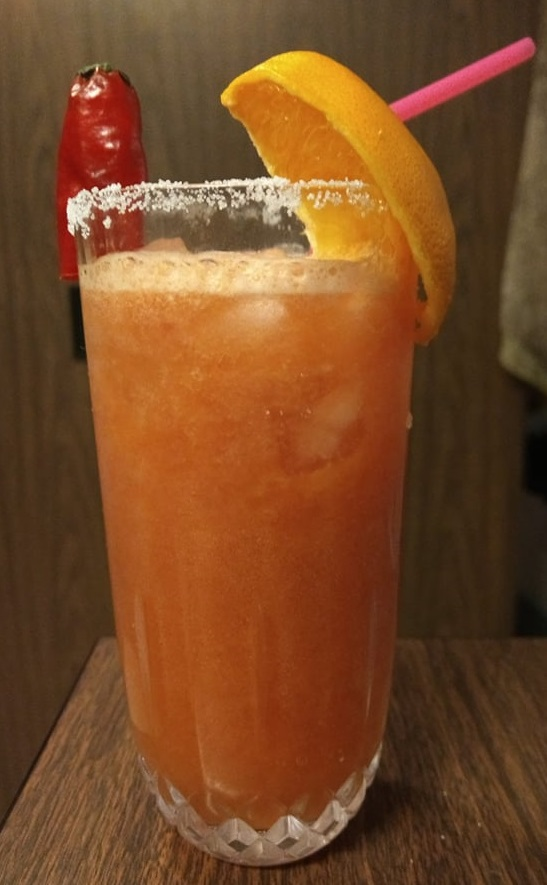
- Vampiro cocktail in a highball glass, garnished with a slice of an orange and a chili pepper
- Type: Cocktail
- Ingredients: 5 cl tequila; 7 cl tomato juice; 3 cl fresh orange juice; 1 cl fresh lime juice; 1 teaspoon clear honey; Half slice onion finely chopped; Few slices fresh red hot chili pepper; Few drops of Worcestershire Sauce; Salt
- Base spirit: Tequila
- Standard drinkware: Old fashioned glass
- Standard garnish: Salt on the rim. Chili pepper (optional)
- Served: On the rocks: poured over ice
- Preparation: Pour ingredients into glass rimmed with salt. Stir.

The vampiro is a cocktail that includes fruit juice, spices, fruit soda, fresh lime juice, and tequila. The vampiro has a fruity, lightly carbonated, and spicy taste.

The vampiro can be made with Mexican sangrita, a prepared drink mixer containing orange juice and chili peppers. One recipe lists the ingredients as tequila, limes, kosher salt, Squirt brand citrus-flavoured soda and Viuda de Sanchez, an orange juice-based Mexican sangrita beverage. Viuda de Sanchez is sold in Mexico and in areas of the southern US with large Latino populations. If Viuda de Sanchez is not available, good quality fresh-squeezed orange juice, lime juice and spicy pico de gallo seasoning can be used as a substitute.

The vampiro is popular in Mexico and is the national drink. Mexicans named the cocktail vampiro ("vampire") because the Viuda de Sanchez juice mixer's red colour is reminiscent of blood.

== Preparation ==
Vampiros may be made in a tall glass or an old fashioned glass. Bartenders may first "rim" the glass with kosher salt, which is done by placing a layer of kosher salt on a chopping board, moistening the glass' rim with lime juice or water, and then placing the upside down glass rim onto the kosher salt, so that the salt sticks to the moistened rim. The second step is to fill half the glass with ice and add one or two shooter glasses full of high quality tequila. The next stage is to add the flavouring elements. This is done by squeezing a fresh lime into the glass, adding a few grains of salt, adding citrus-flavoured soda pop until the glass is 4/5 full, and then adding spicy Viuda de Sanchez (or orange juice, lime juice and pico de gallo). The final step is to stir the ingredients so that the flavours are properly blended.

According to journalist Duncan Tucker, the vampiro originated in San Luis Soyatlán, Mexico, where it is traditionally sold in clear plastic bags with a straw. A local fruit stand vendor named Oscar Hernández claims to have created the drink. He says he initially prepared it for his own consumption, but his customers quickly asked to make it for them, and the drink spread by word of mouth.

=== Variants ===
Some bartending guides suggest adding a shot of tomato juice, fresh-squeezed orange and lime juice, grenadine syrup, hot pepper sauce and freshly-ground black pepper to the glass, and omitting the Mexican sangrita. As well, some guides suggest that the ingredients be shaken and strained, not stirred.

In 2017, David Hammond from the Chicago Tribune described a variant called the doce vampiro cocktail, which is served at La Sirena Clandestina in Chicago. The blood-red drink is a blend of "...pisco, tequila, lemon, pineapple, Ramazzotti amaro and chicha morada, a sweet, tart, nonalcoholic Peruvian drink made from purple corn". Hammond states that the "...pisco, pineapple and lemon, bright and acidic, are the high notes", with the "...tequila, bitter herbaceousness of the Ramazzotti and baking-spice qualities of the chicha morada" providing the "[b]ass notes".
