= Sangrita =

Mexican non-alcoholic drink

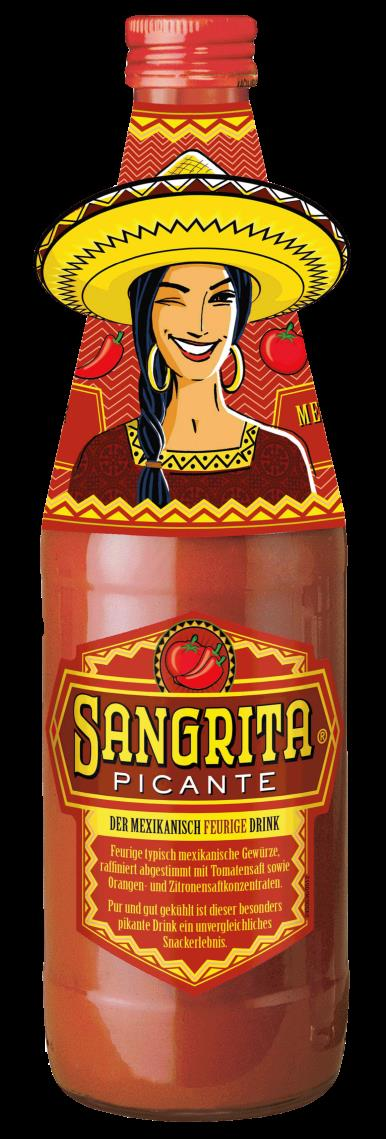
- Type: Drink
- Country of origin: Jalisco, Mexico
- Colour: Red
- Ingredients: Orange juice, lime juice, chili sauce

Sangrita (meaning "little blood"), is a Mexican non-alcoholic drink often served with tequila – customarily a shot of tequila blanco. Its origin dates back to the 1920s.

== History ==
A popular recipe in Guadalajara, Jalisco's largest city, it is speculated to have originated from the leftover juices (mainly orange) of an equally popular regional fruit salad covered with fine chili powder (usually piquin). As the fruit salad, known to jalisquillos (Guadalajara's natives) as pico de gallo, was consumed from a large bowl during breakfast, the remaining juice was saved and poured on a small and narrow clay cup, which itself would be the precursor of the tequila shot glass.

In almost all cases the drink took its bright red color from a mix of the fine pepper powder, spices, and pomegranate, while the base was mainly orange or sweetened lime juice. The key to a balanced sangrita recipe can be found in the fruit salad's recipes, which would have included any or all of the following: tangerine, cucumber, papaya, mango and jicama.

Traditionally, tequila and sangrita are each poured into a separate shot glass (or caballito) and the two are alternately sipped, not chased. Sangrita is used in a drink known as "The Mexican Flag", where three separate double shot glasses are filled with lime juice, tequila and sangrita. Sangrita is an ingredient in the Mexikaner mixed shot.

== Ingredients ==
Authentic sangrita from the Lake Chapala region of Jalisco is made with Seville orange, lime and pomegranate juices, with chili powder or hot sauce added for heat. However, most modern sangrita recipes (particularly outside of Jalisco) have mistakenly attributed the red appearance of the drink to tomato juice instead of the chile powder. While some would argue that there is no set rule on what sangrita should contain as the main ingredient, it is commonly considered by older residents of Jalisco that tomato, and particularly branded recipes such as the "Clamato" mix, stem from uninformed efforts to recreate the drink due to its growing popularity. It can feature a blend of orange, lime, tomato and/or pomegranate juices, or pomegranate-based grenadine with the addition of something spicy (hot sauce or fresh/dried chili pepper), and sometimes white onion and salt.
