= Fernand Petiot =

French bartender (1900–1975)

Fernand Petiot (born in Paris, February 18, 1900; died in Canton, Ohio, January 6, 1975) was a bartender who claimed to have created the Bloody Mary, a popular cocktail drink.

== Biography ==
Petiot was born into the hospitality industry in Paris in 1900, where his parents kept a large pension (a boarding house usually offering full daily meals), helping his mother in the kitchen from an early age. He became kitchen boy at The New York Bar in Paris at the age of 16, and married at 18.

Petiot, known by his nickname "Pete", progressed to bartender under Harry MacElhone at The New York Bar, later known as Harry's New York Bar. There he is said to have invented the first Bloody Mary cocktail in the early 1920s, according to his granddaughter and Al Thompson. The New York Bar was a frequent hangout for American expatriates such as Ernest Hemingway, as well as movie stars and other celebrities of the day, including Ava Gardner, Rex Harrison, Douglas Fairbanks Junior, Salvador Dalí and Joe DiMaggio. According to the bar's own traditions, the Bloody Mary was created on the spur-of-the-moment for a small group of friends, and at first consisted only of vodka and tomato juice. There he was also unofficial banker for American doughboys.

Petiot set a record in Paris at a beer-drinking contest on June 15, 1925, when he drank a two-liter glass of beer in 46.5 seconds (approximately equivalent to a 6-pack of 12-oz beers).

After a short period at London's Savoy Hotel, Petiot moved to the United States in 1925. After a sojourn in Canton, Ohio, where he met his second wife Ruth, he became head bartender at New York City's St. Regis Hotel in 1933–34, eventually having a staff of 17 barmen under him. One of Petiot's most famous regular customers there was gangster Frank Costello.

Petiot worked at the St. Regis as one of New York's most popular bartenders until his retirement in 1966. At that time he returned to Canton, Ohio, where he bartended occasionally at Mergus Restaurant. Petiot claimed to have served drinks to every U.S. president from 1934 to 1972 except for Lyndon B. Johnson.

He died in Canton in early January 1975 at age 74.

== Developing the Bloody Mary ==
According to Fernand Petiot, the first two customers for whom he made the drink "were from Chicago, and they say there is a bar there named the Bucket of Blood. And there is a waitress there everybody calls Bloody Mary. One of the boys said that the drink reminds him of Bloody Mary, and the name stuck." Following his move to the United States, Petiot first added salt, lemon, and Tabasco sauce — now considered essential ingredients — to the Bloody Mary in order to satisfy requests from American customers for a spicier drink. The New Yorker magazine quoted Petiot as saying: "I initiated the Bloody Mary of today," [he told us,] "George Jessel said he created it, but it was really nothing but vodka and tomato juice when I took it over. I cover the bottom of the shaker with four large dashes of salt, two dashes of black pepper, two dashes of cayenne pepper, and a layer of Worcestershire sauce; I then add a dash of lemon juice and some cracked ice, put in two ounces of vodka and two ounces of thick tomato juice, shake, strain, and pour." The origins of the name and the recipe are controversial; see article Bloody Mary Cocktail for further details.

In the 1930s Petiot tried without success to change the name of the Bloody Mary to the "Red Snapper".

== Sources ==
Unless otherwise stated, all information in this article derives from Al Thompson, "Bloody Mary Inventor Likes Sipping Scotch"
