= Tajín seasoning =

Spice blend

Tajín Clásico
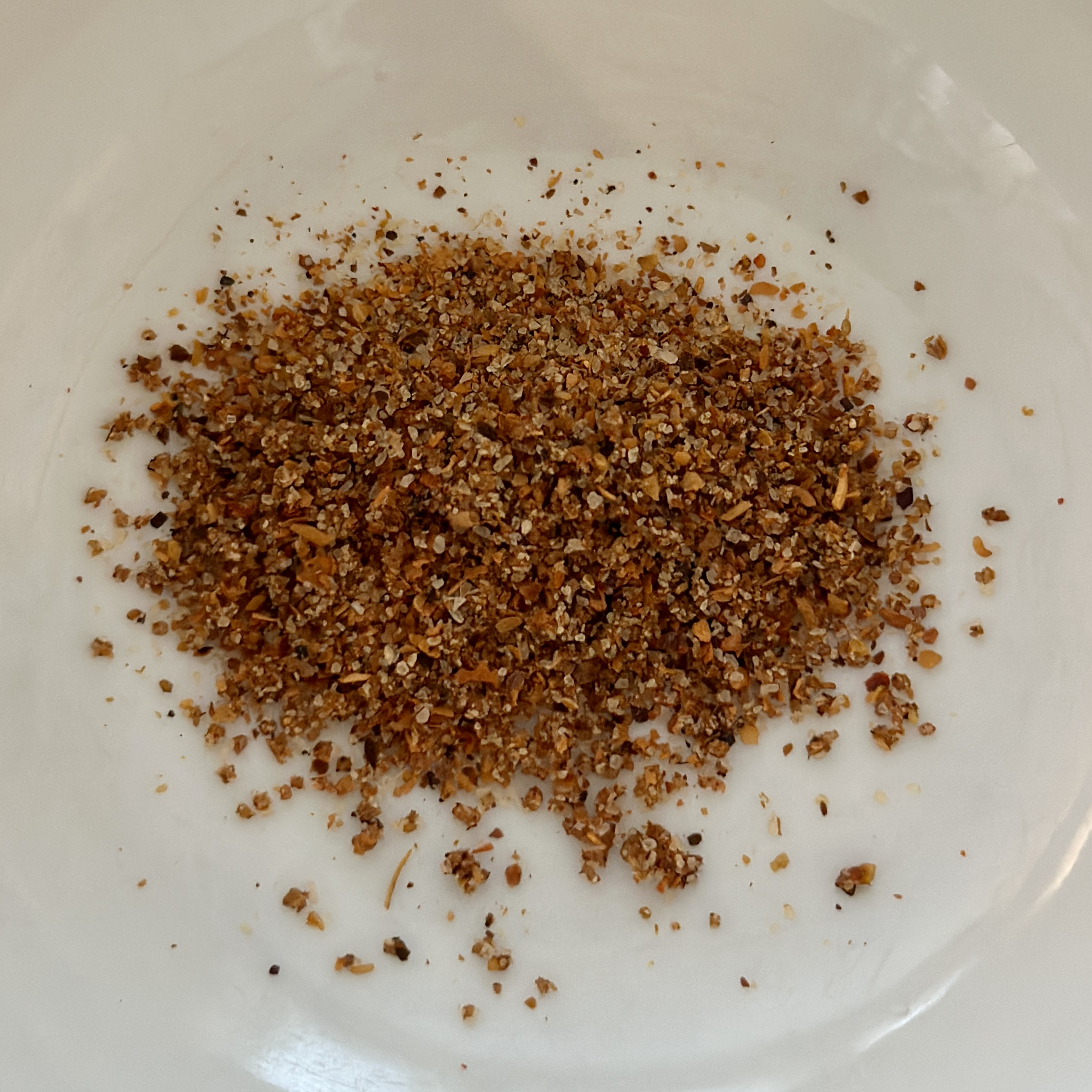
- Tajín seasoning in a bowl
- Type: Garnish, condiment, or ingredient
- Place of origin: Guadalajara, Mexico
- Main ingredients: Chili, lime, salt

Tajín Clásico, often referred to as simply Tajín (Spanish pronunciation: [taˈxin]), is a Mexican spice mix consisting predominantly of lime, chili peppers and salt. It is used in a variety of preparations.

== History ==
The combination of chili and lime is a classic one in traditional Mexican cuisine and is commonly used on fruits and vegetables.

Tajín Clásico was created in 1985 by Horacio Fernández, who wanted to recreate in powdered form the flavors of a sauce made by his grandmother. Fernández named the product after the pre-Columbian archaeological site of El Tajín in the eastern Mexican state of Veracruz, which he visited and was impressed by, after realizing that ají, meaning chili, shares three of the same letters. Tajín Clásico entered the U.S. market in 1993, building a plant in Houston; Tajín became a commonly used condiment in Texas. In the 2000s, the brand expanded internationally.

== Description and ingredients ==
Tajín Clásico seasoning (often referred to as simply Tajín), the company's most popular product, is a seasoning powder consisting of ground chiles de árbol, guajillo chili, pasilla chili, sea salt and dehydrated lime.

It is a grainy reddish powder with flavors that are sweet, salty, and sour, with a mild heat from the chilis. The flavor of the lime is at the forefront and the flavor of the chilis is subtle. It imparts a reddish color to dishes. When used as a garnish or condiment, the graininess can also add texture to dishes.

== Uses ==
Tajín is used in a variety of preparations. It is used as a garnish, a condiment and an ingredient. It is used in both sweet and savory dishes.

The blend is commonly used with fruit, but is also used with vegetables, dips, sauces, desserts, in cocktails such as micheladas, or to rim a margarita. It can also be used as a rub for meats, poultry, or fish. It can be used as a replacement for salt in omelets or on popcorn.

== Reception ==
Tasting Table called Tajín Clasico a "classic Mexican spice blend". Parade called it a "cult favorite". According to Mexican food historian Gustavo Arellano, "Tajín is a lifestyle."

== Manufacturers ==
The manufacturer, Empresas Tajín, was founded in Guadalajara, Mexico, in 1985 by Horacio Fernández, who originally sold the blend store-to-store; the company is located in Zapopan, Jalisco, Mexico. Several other manufacturers, including Trader Joe's, Trechas, and Lawry's, make competitor products.

== Gallery ==
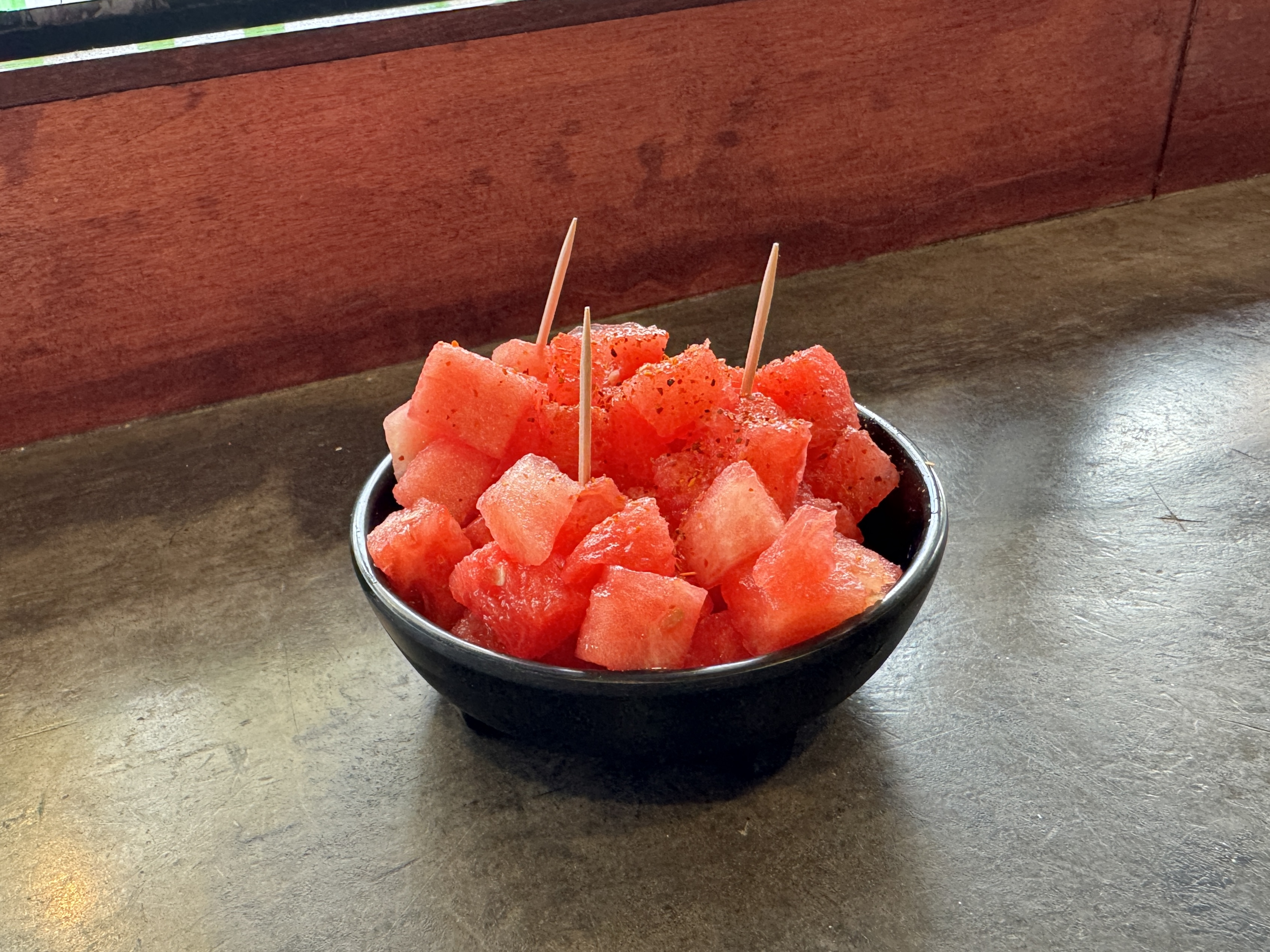
Watermelon with Tajín

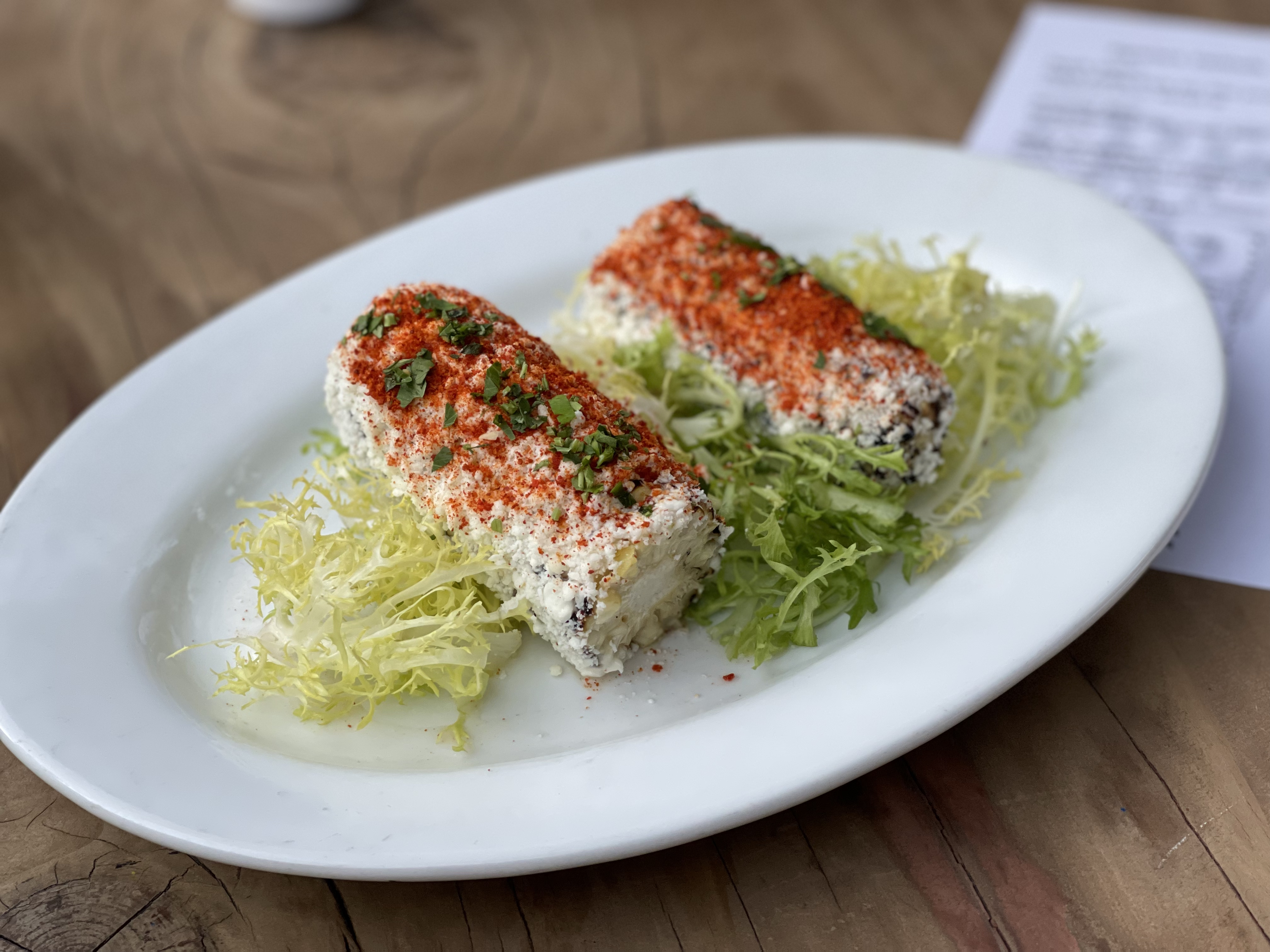
Elotes with Tajín

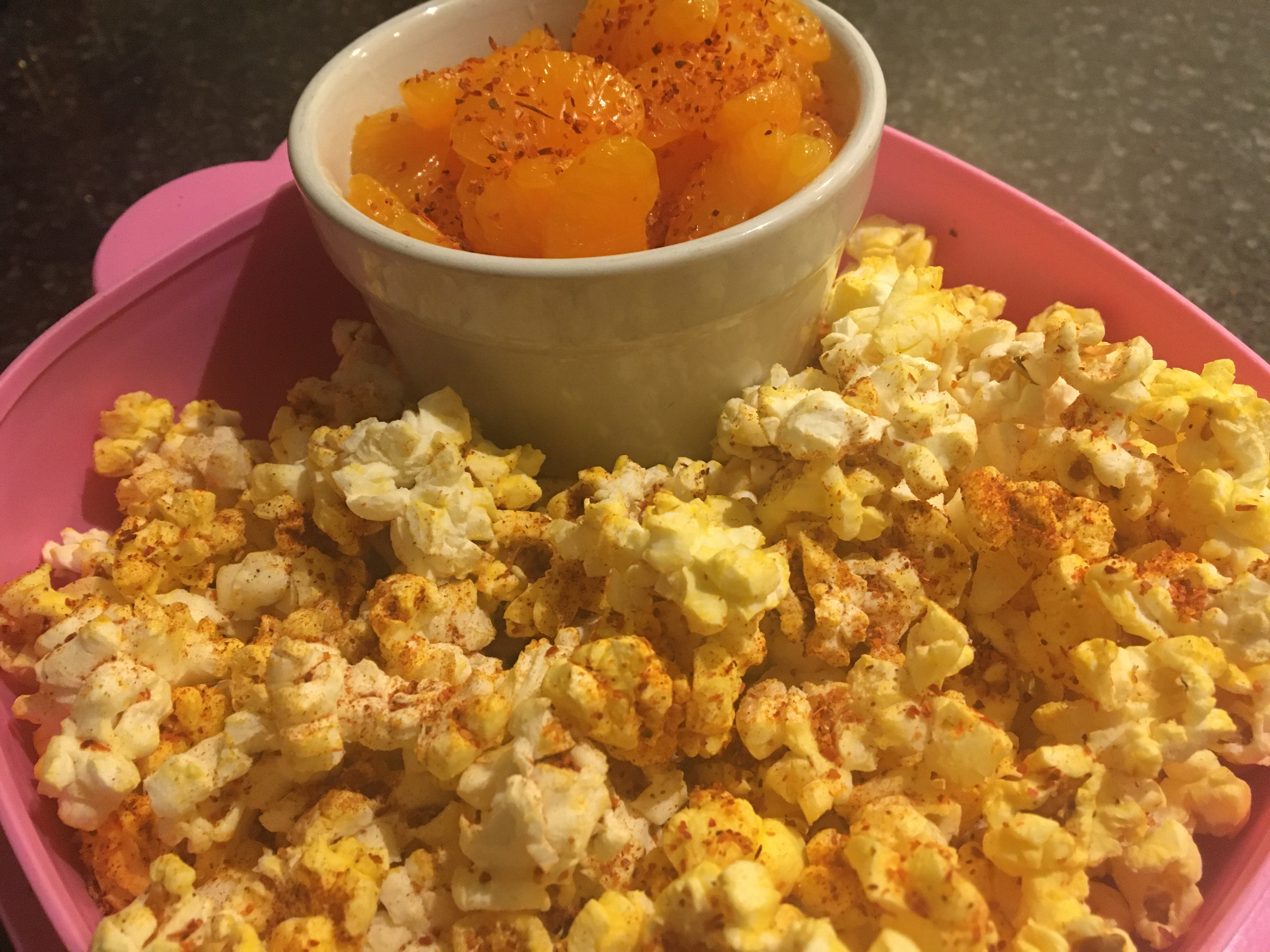
Mandarin oranges and popcorn, both sprinkled in Tajín

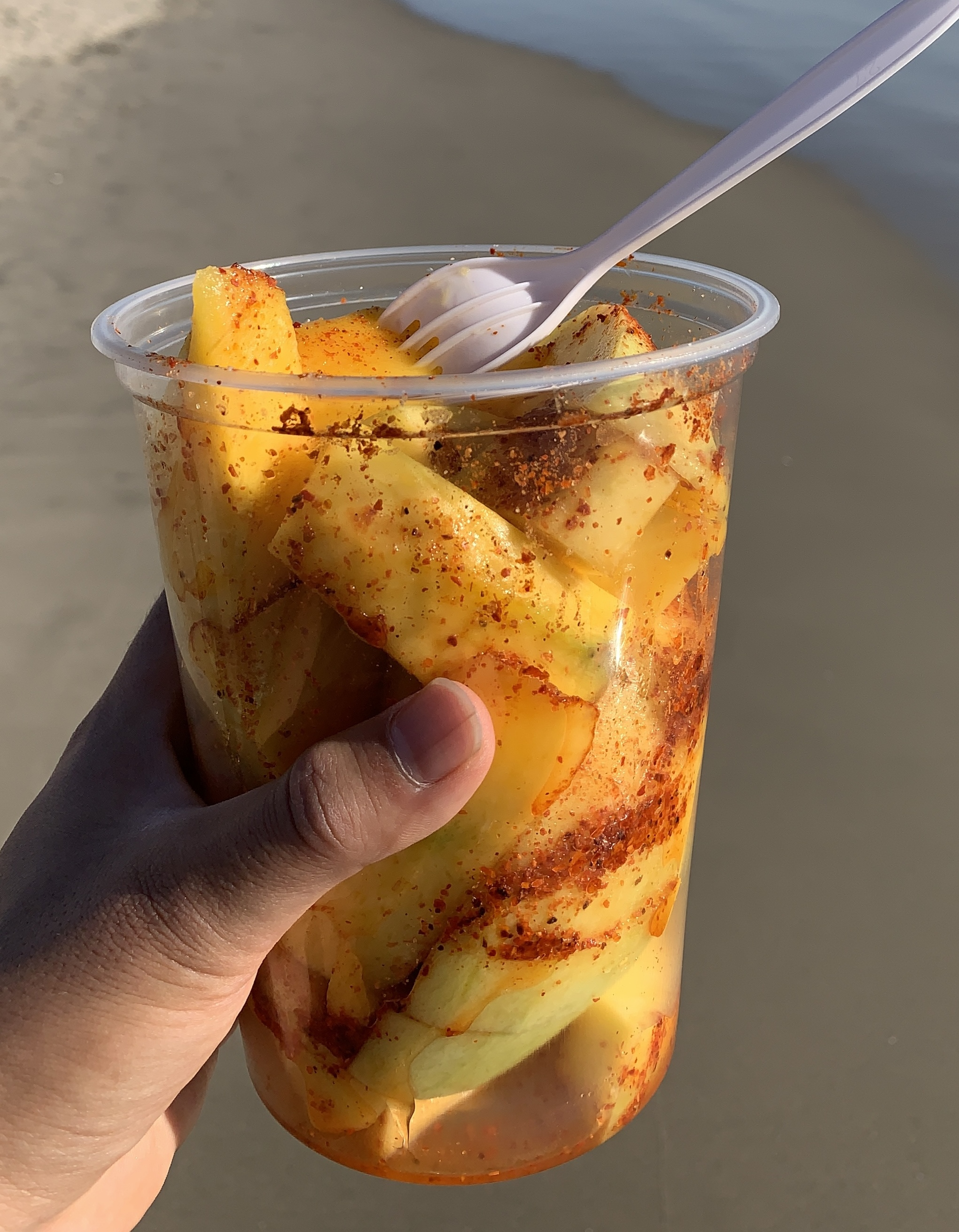
Mango with Tajín from a vendor in Santa Monica, California

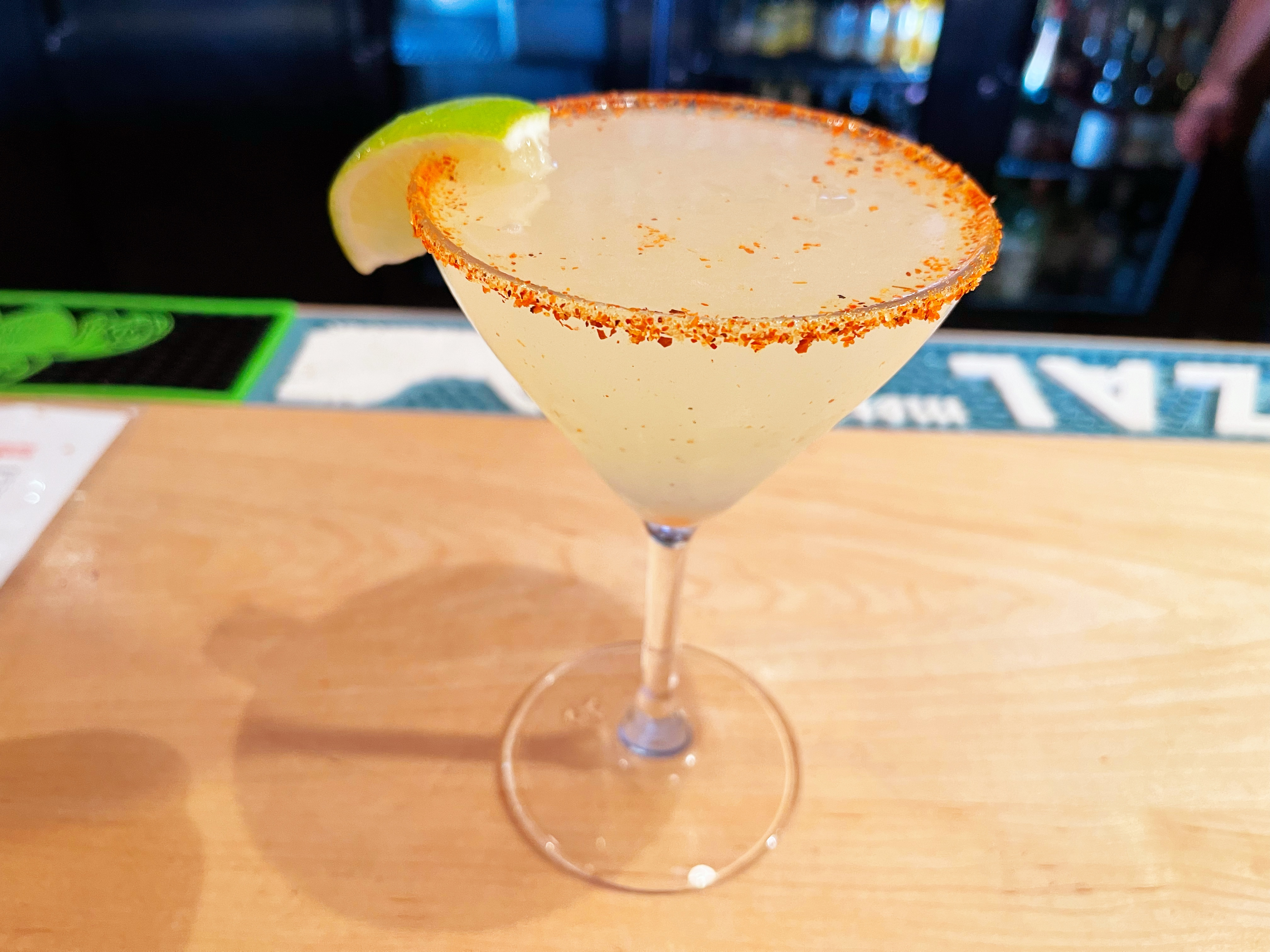
Margarita rimmed with Tajín

== Similar flavor profiles in Mexican cuisine ==
Chamoy is a sauce made from fermented fruit and chiles. Sal de gusano is a condiment made with dried worms and chilis. and Sal de chapulin is made with dried grasshoppers and ground chiles. Mexican cuisine also includes other flavored salts and multiple examples of candies which are sweet and hot or tart, such as Brinquitos.

== See also ==
- Media related to Tajín (seasoning) at Wikimedia Commons
- List of culinary herbs and spices
