= Glass rimmer =

Bar accessory for applying salt or sugar

A glass rimmer is a bar accessory used to apply salt or sugar to the rim of a glass. It usually consists of one or more shallow plastic or metal discs that the glass is turned upside down into. The discs can be filled with either the rimming salt or sugar, or sometimes something to moisten the rim of the glass such as lime juice.

The purpose of rimming the glass can either be for aesthetics or to enhance the flavor of a cocktail. Rimming usually crosses both categories. Adding something to the rim of the glass is visually appealing and therefore ornamental, but with proper selection it can substantially enhance the flavor of the drink.

Some bartenders choose to prepare several rimmed glasses in advance to save time on preparation.

== Preparation ==
There are many ways to adhere salt, sugar, etc. to a rim. These could include gomme syrup, simple syrup, maple syrup, lime, orange or lemon juice, caramel or chocolate sauce, marshmallow crème, and in rare cases, water. Water is generally only used with very finely powdered choices, such as caster sugar, icing sugar, and finely ground spice items such as cinnamon sugar. In most cases the material that is used has a natural tack or stickiness before it dries, and continues to hold after it dries. Typically this is citrus juice, since this is readily available at a bar.

== Styles ==
There are several styles of rimming. The most common style is rimming the whole rim of the glass, while another style is half rimming or even three quarter rimming. The logic with partial rims is that if the client wants the additional flavor, it's available; if they prefer it without, then it can be avoided.

== Materials ==
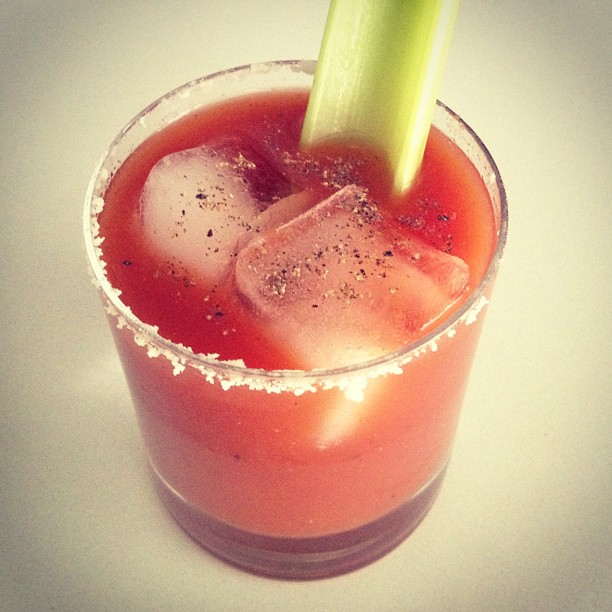
Bloody Mary with rosemary salt rim

Anything that complements the flavor of the liquor in the drink can be used to rim a glass. Most common materials used are salt and sugar. There are colorful sugars, usually used for cake decorations. There are also flavored salts and sugars. More advanced materials can be used as well like wasabi sugar or wasabi salt for hot and spicy drinks; vanilla sugar, cinnamon sugar, ginger sugar, gingerbread spice and similar for enhancing eggnog and seasonal drinks; salt & pepper, celery salt or celery pepper for the Bloody Mary and Bloody Caesar; powdered chocolate, chocolate sprinkles, and ground coconut for sweet or tropical drinks; Graham cracker crumbs for a sidecar; Jell-O powder and Kool-Aid powder are interesting variations for novelty drinks; and crushed candy cane secured with marshmallow Crème for seasonal cocktails.

== Tools ==
=== Glass rimmers ===
These devices come in two, three, four or even five-tier models. The most basic model comes with two compartments. One is for a sponge pad that is generally soaked with lime juice, and the other is filled with salt, since that's the most common item used for rimming a glass. Most of them can be used without the pad providing an extra compartment for a different rimming material.

=== Rimming tray ===
A long narrow ceramic tray can also be used to rim a glass. They are easier to clean, easier to fill, reasonably sturdy and they lend themselves to the partial rim technique.

=== Plate ===
An ordinary coffee cup saucer is sufficient for many typical glasses. The eponymously named Margarita glass might require something as large as the traditional side plate.

=== Barmaid rimmer ===
There are devices, such as the Barmaid rimmer, that can rim glasses. This device is something akin to a pepper mill, and fits on the edge of the glass and dispenses precisely the right amount of the substance by operating a button on top with one's thumb as one rotates it or the glass. Its main advantage is that one can rim a glass after it is filled with liquid.

== See also ==
- Cocktail garnish
