= Cerveza preparada =

Mexican drink of beer mixed with sauces, lemon, salt

Cerveza Preparada
- Ingredients: Tomato juice; Mexican beer
- Standard drinkware: Pint glass
- Served: With ice

Cerveza preparada (Spanish pronunciation: [seɾˈβesa pɾepaˈɾaða], 'prepared beer') is a Mexican drink of beer mixed with sauces, lime, salt, and hot sauce.

The basic recipe is Maggi sauce, Worcestershire sauce, salt, hot sauce and lemon mixed with beer in an ice-cold, salt-rimmed pint glass. The beer is added by pouring it from high above the glass so that the contents will mix properly.

== Variations ==
Michelada
- Ingredients: Tomato juice; Mexican beer; Hot sauce
- Standard drinkware: Beer mug
- Standard garnish: Optionally one or both of: Crudités (carrot and celery sticks); Shrimp
- Served: On the rocks: poured over ice

=== Chamochela ===
A chamochela is a beer-based drink prepared with lemon, salt, chili powder and chamoy. It is served with ice and garnished with tamarind candy.

=== Michalada con clamato ===
A Michelada con clamato is a cerveza preparada that is popular in Mexican restaurants both as a drink and as an appetizer if it is served with a garnish. It is made with tomato juice, Clamato, or V8 Vegetable Juice mixed with beer and seasoned with hot sauce (e.g., Tabasco, Tapatio, or Búfalo). It is served on the rocks in an ice-cold, salt-rimmed mug and garnished with crudités (carrot and celery sticks) or shrimp.

=== Michelada ===
A michelada is a Mexican drink made from beer mixed with spice, sauce and lime.

=== Negro y Marron ===
The Negro y Marron is a mix of beer, ice, Clamato, lemon or lime juice and tequila. It is seasoned with hot sauce and served in a chilled beer mug rimmed with salt.
