= Caesar (cocktail) =

Cocktail created and primarily consumed in Canada

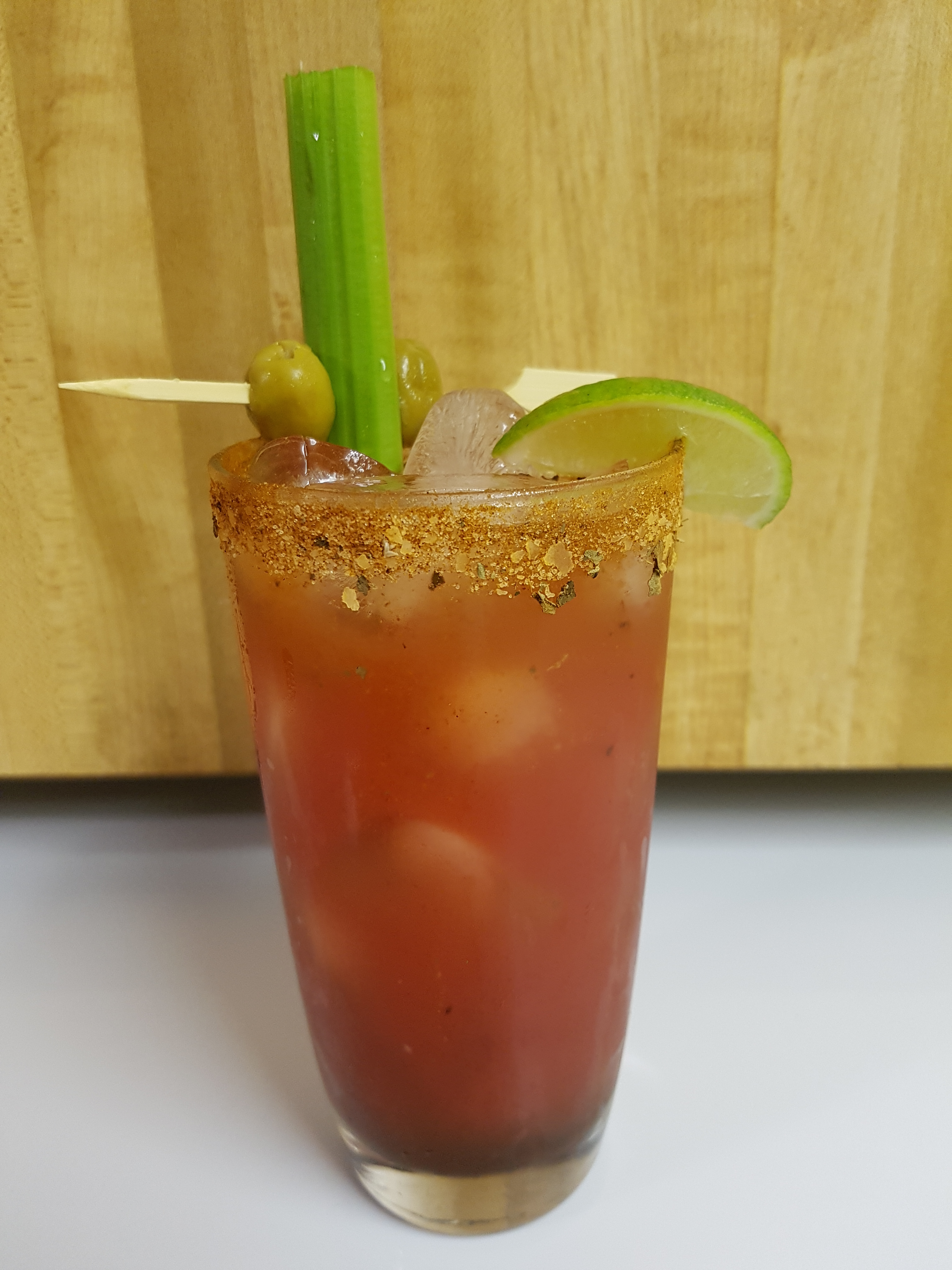
- Caesar made with 2 shots of vodka, a pinch of horseradish, a little spicy with 5 dashes of tabasco, made muddy with about 10 dashes of Worcestershire sauce, all over ice, and filled to the top of a celery salt and spice rimmed glass with Clamato juice.
- Type: Cocktail
- Ingredients: 6 oz. Clamato Juice; 1–1 1/2 oz. vodka; 2 dashes hot sauce; 4 dashes Worcestershire sauce; Celery salt; Freshly ground pepper; Lime wedge; 1 crisp celery stalk
- Standard drinkware: Highball glass
- Standard garnish: stalk of celery and wedge of lime
- Served: on the rocks
- Preparation: Rim glass with celery salt, and a lime wedge.

A Caesar is a cocktail created and consumed primarily in Canada. It typically contains vodka, Clamato, hot sauce, and Worcestershire sauce, and is served with ice in a large, celery salt-rimmed glass, typically garnished with a stalk of celery and wedge of lime. It is similar to a Bloody Mary, but is distinguished by the clam broth content of the Clamato. The cocktail may also be contrasted with the Michelada, which has similar flavouring ingredients but uses beer instead of vodka.

== Origin ==
'Bloody Mary a La Milo' in the 1951 Ted Saucier cocktail book titled 'Bottoms Up' (page 45), appears to be the first published cocktail recipe that includes vodka, tomato juice, clam juice, and Worcestershire sauce. Saucier credits the recipe to Milo J. Sutliff, Publisher, New York. This pre-dates the version at the Polonaise nightclub in Manhattan, which debuted in November 1953. The drink was introduced as the "Smirnoff Smiler" by owner Paul Pawlowski. In December 1953, columnist Walter Winchell reported that the drink was seasoned with "a dash of Wooooshhhtasheer Sauce".

In 1959, cartoonist and creator of The Addams Family, Charles Addams (employed by the New Yorker magazine, a few blocks from the Polonaise) claimed he invented the "Gravel Gertie", a cocktail of clam/tomato juice and vodka seasoned with Tabasco sauce.

In 1962, Carl La Marca, bar manager at the Baker Hotel in Dallas, invented the "Imperial Clam Digger", adding a basil garnish and dash of lime to an existing version of the "Smirnoff Smiler", called the "Clam Digger".

In October 1968, Seagram president Victor Fischel and Mott's Clamato marketer Ray Anrig claimed to have invented the seasoned tomato/clam/vodka cocktail, the "Clamdigger" earlier in 1968, in Manhattan. Seagram, headquartered 2 blocks from the Polonaise, filed a trademark application on the name "Clamdigger" claiming first use on May 31, 1968. From late 1968 to the end of 1969, Seagram and Mott's ran a major advertising promotion of the "Clam Digger" cocktail recipe in national magazines.

The Caesar was invented in 1969 by restaurant manager Walter Chell of the Calgary Inn (today the Westin Hotel) in Calgary, Alberta, Canada. Chell devised the cocktail after being tasked to create a signature drink for the Calgary Inn's new Italian restaurant. He mixed vodka with clam and tomato juice, Worcestershire sauce, and other spices, creating a drink similar to a Bloody Mary, but with a uniquely spicy flavour.

Chell said his inspiration came from Italy. He recalled that in Venice, they served Spaghetti alle vongole, spaghetti with tomato sauce and clams. He reasoned that the mixture of clams and tomato sauce would make a good drink, and mashed clams to form a "nectar" that he mixed with other ingredients.

According to Chell's granddaughter, his Italian ancestry led him to call the drink a "Caesar". The longer name of "Bloody Caesar" is said to differentiate the drink from the Bloody Mary, but Chell said it was a regular patron at the bar who served as the inspiration. During the three months he spent working to perfect the drink, he had customers sample it and offer feedback. One regular customer, an Englishman, who often ordered the drink said one day, "Walter, that's a damn good bloody Caesar".

== Popularity ==
Chell said the drink was an immediate hit with the restaurant's patrons, claiming it "took off like a rocket". Within five years of its introduction, the Caesar had become Calgary's most popular mixed drink. It spread throughout Western Canada, then to the east. In Calgary, Mayor Dave Bronconnier celebrated the drink's anniversary by declaring May 13, 2009 Caesar Day in the city.

The Mott's company was independently developing Clamato, a mixture of clam and tomato juices, at the same time the Caesar was invented. Sales of Clamato were initially slow: Mott's sold only 500 cases of Clamato in 1970, but sales consistently increased after the company's distributors discovered Chell's drink. By 1994, 70% of Mott's Clamato sales in Canada were made to mix Caesars, while half of all Clamato sales were made in Western Canada. Mott’s was behind a 2009 effort to promote national recognition of the cocktail.

In the United States, the Caesar is typically available at bars along the Canada–United States border. Elsewhere, bartenders will frequently offer a Bloody Mary in its place. In Europe, the drink can be found wherever there are higher concentrations of Canadians. The drink's anonymity outside Canada has continued in spite of concerted marketing efforts. Producers of clam-tomato juices have speculated that their beverages have been hampered by what they describe as the "clam barrier". They have found that consumers in the United States fear that there is too much clam in the beverages.

While Mott's Clamato continues to be synonymous with the cocktail, other producers have begun offering alternative Caesar mixes. Walter Caesar (named in honour of Chell) was launched in 2013 to offer an 'all-natural' alternative to Clamato. Walter Caesar also became the first Caesar mix in Canada to be approved by Ocean Wise by using ocean-friendly clam juice from the North Atlantic.

The Caesar is popular as a hangover "cure", though its effectiveness has been questioned.

Mott's holds an annual "Best Caesar in Town" competition as part of the Prince Edward Island International Shellfish Festival. Contests held across Canada to celebrate the cocktail's 40th anniversary in 2009 encouraged variants that featured the glass rimmed with Tim Hortons coffee grounds, Caesars with maple syrup, and Caesars with bacon-infused vodka.

The first liquor store dedicated to the Caesar opened on July 1, 2023 in Calgary, Alberta.

== Preparation ==
Basic preparation of a Caesar follows the "one, two, three, four" rule. The recipe calls for 1 imp fl oz (28 ml) of vodka, two dashes of hot sauce, three dashes of salt and pepper, four dashes of Worcestershire sauce, and the glass topped up with clamato. The glass is rimmed with celery salt or a mixture of salt and pepper and garnished with a celery stalk and lime.

The Caesar is an unusual drink in that it can be mixed in bulk and stored for a period of time before drinking.

=== Variants ===
Though it was not one of Chell's original ingredients, Tabasco sauce is a frequent addition, as is horseradish. Vodka is occasionally replaced with gin, tequila or rum, though the Clamato may not be substituted. A variant that replaces vodka with beer is commonly called a "Red Eye" or a "Clam Eye", one with Vodka and a beer bottle on top is a "Bloody MooseHead", and one without alcohol is a "Virgin Caesar". The Toronto Institute of Bartending operates a "Caesar School" in various locations across Canada that teaches bartenders how to mix several variants of the drink.

== See also ==
- Canadian cuisine
- List of Canadian inventions and discoveries
- List of cocktails
- Queen Mary (cocktail)
- Tomato beer
