= Celery salt =

Salt seasoned with celery seeds

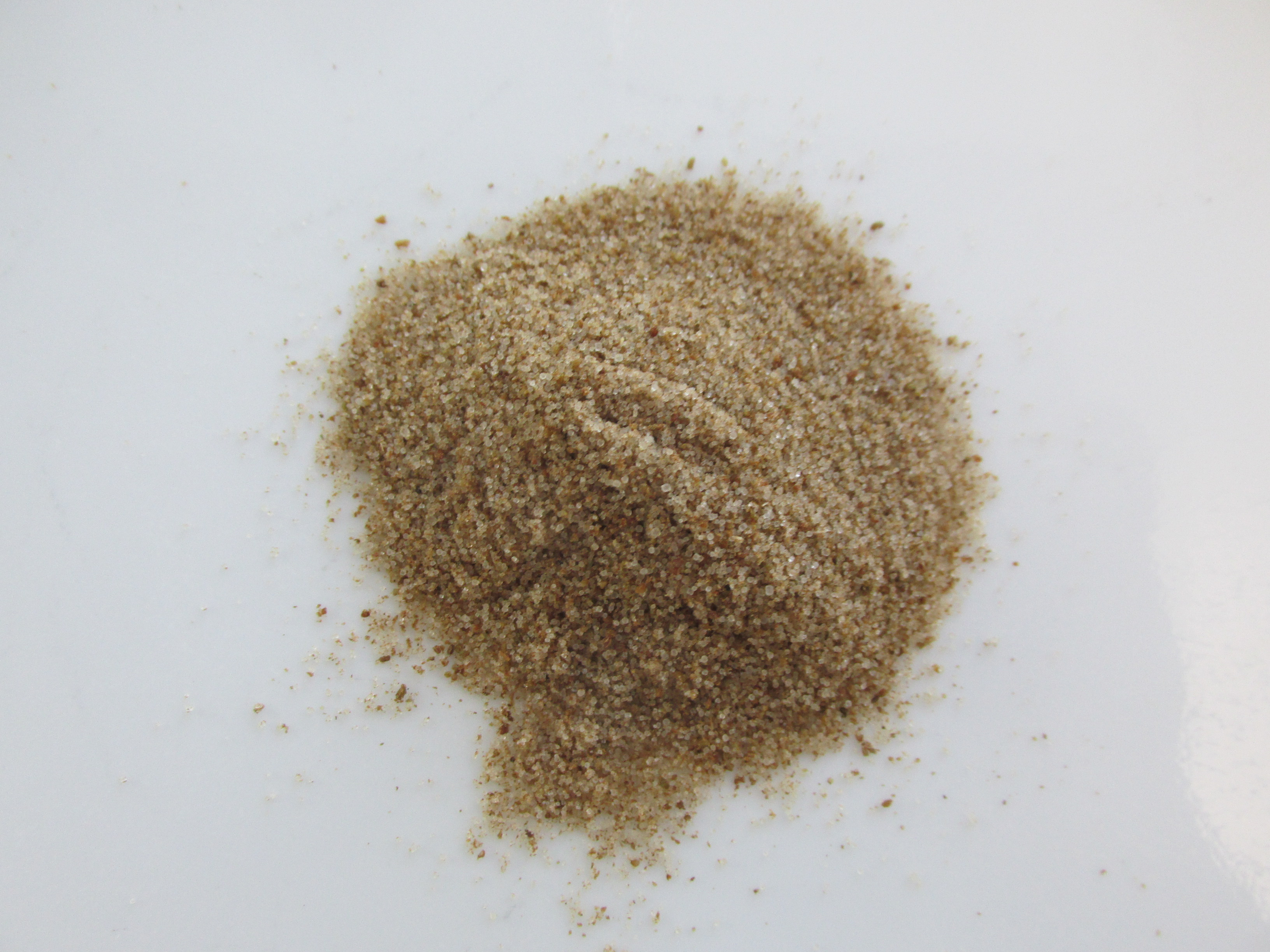
Celery salt

Celery salt is a seasoned salt used to flavour food. The primary ingredient is table salt and the flavouring agent is ground seeds from celery or its relative, lovage. It is also sometimes produced using dried celery or seed oleoresin.

== Additives ==
Celery salt sometimes contains an anticaking agent such as silicon dioxide or calcium silicate.

As a vegetable, celery seeds have potassium as the dominant ion over sodium (ninefold more).

== Uses ==
Celery salt is an ingredient of the Bloody Mary cocktail and the Caesar cocktail. It is also reported to be an ingredient in KFC's secret spice mix. It is also commonly used to season the Chicago-style hot dog, the New York System wiener, salads, coleslaw and stews. It is a primary ingredient in Old Bay brand seasoning.

Because sodium nitrate, a chemical that serves as a food preservative, occurs naturally in celery, celery salt is often used by food producers to prevent spoilage while avoiding listing sodium nitrate on the ingredients list directly..

== See also ==
- Celery powder
- List of edible salts
