= Tomato juice =

Beverage made from tomatoes

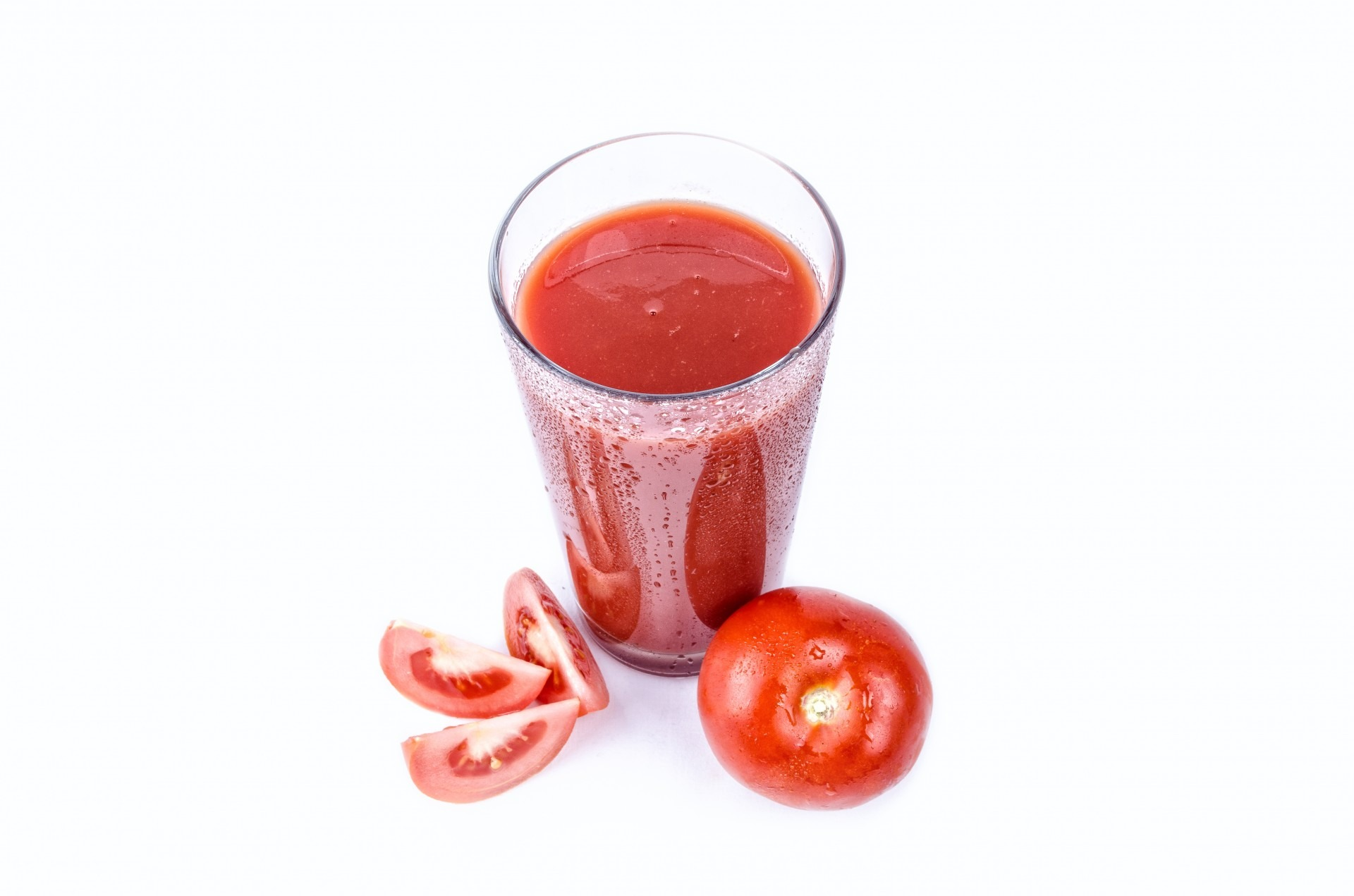

Nutritional value per 100 g (3.5 oz)
- Energy: 73 kJ (17 kcal)
- Carbohydrates: 3.53 g
- Sugars: 2.58 g
- Dietary fiber: 0.4 g
- Fat: 0.29 g
- Protein: 0.86 g
Vitamins and minerals
Vitamins	Quantity %DV^{†}
Vitamin C	78% 70.1 mg
- Other constituents: Quantity
- Water: 94.24 g
- ^{†}Percentages estimated using US recommendations for adults.

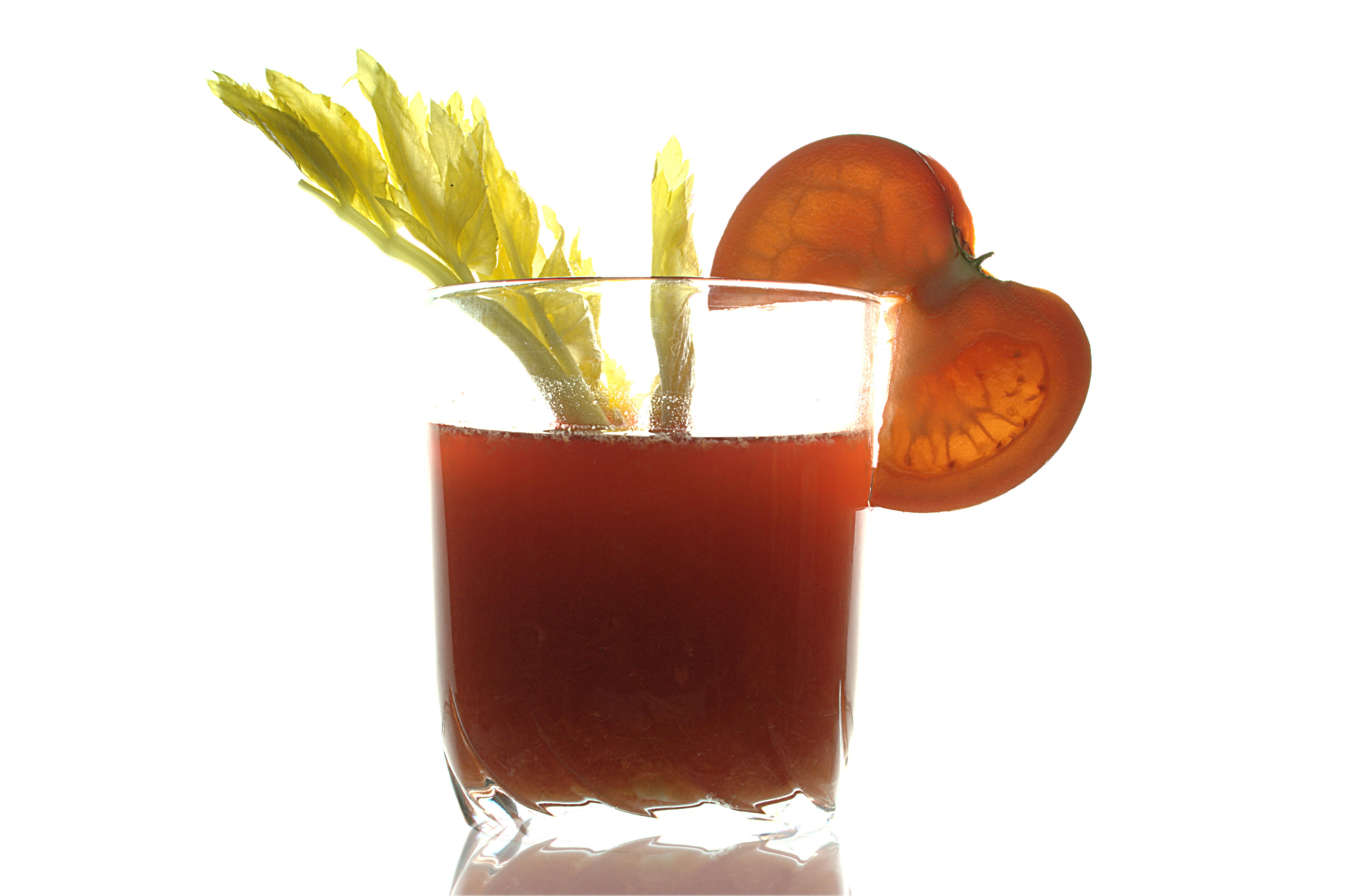
Tomato juice in a glass, decorated with a tomato slice and a sprig of celery

Tomato juice is a juice made from tomatoes, usually used as a beverage, either plain or in cocktails such as a Bloody Mary, a Caesar, or Michelada.

== Production ==
Many commercial manufacturers of tomato juice also add salt. Other ingredients are also often added, such as onion powder, garlic powder, and other spices. In the United States, mass-produced tomato juice began to be marketed in the mid 1920s, and became a popular breakfast drink a few years thereafter.

In the United States, most tomato juice is made from tomato paste, but pressing is allowed as well. The tomatoes are required to be ripe (using a color standard on the finished product), mostly blemish-free, and mostly deseeded. The total solid content is more than 5.0%, with no added water allowed. Additional salt and organic acidulants, but not sweeteners, are allowed.

In Canada, tomato juice is unconcentrated and pasteurized. The other requirements are largely similar, except that additives allowed are a sweetening agent, citric acid and salt. Reconstituted juices in general are required to be labelled clearly.

== History ==
Tomato juice was reportedly first served as a beverage in 1917 by Louis Perrin at the French Lick Springs Hotel in southern Indiana. His combination of squeezed tomatoes, sugar and his special sauce became an instant success as Chicago businessmen spread the word about the tomato juice cocktail. Before that, tomato juice was strained after the tomatoes were juiced, and the result was then used for sauce, syrup and wine, but not as a drink.

== Uses ==
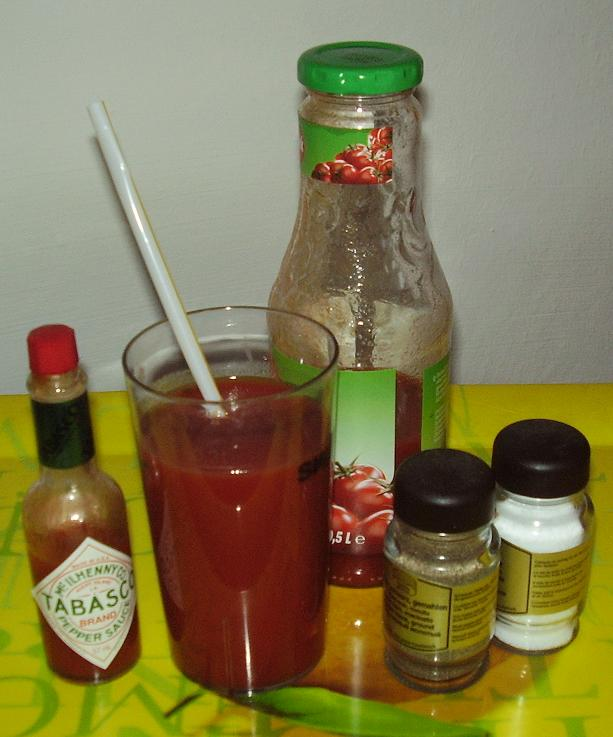
Tomato juice with other ingredients found in Bloody Mary mix

In Canada and Mexico, tomato juice is commonly mixed with beer; the concoction is known in Canada as Calgary Red-Eye, and in Mexico as Cerveza preparada. Tomato juice is the base for the cocktails Bloody Mary and Bloody Caesar, and the cocktail mixer Clamato. In the UK, tomato juice is commonly combined with Worcestershire sauce. In Germany, tomato juice is a base ingredient in the Mexikaner mixed shot.

Chilled tomato juice was formerly popular as an appetizer at restaurants in the United States. Tomato juice is frequently used as a packing liquid for canned tomatoes, though it is sometimes replaced by tomato purée for international commerce due to tariff issues on vegetables vs. sauces. According to Cook's Illustrated magazine, tomatoes packed in juice as opposed to purée tend to win taste tests, being perceived as fresher tasting.

Tomato juice is used in the preparation of tomato juice agar, used to culture various species of Lactobacillus. Tomato juice is a popular drink among airplane passengers. A small study by Yan and Dando hints that this is due to an increased perception of umami flavor while in the loud and pressurized environment of the cabin. An alternative explanation is that it has become tradition similar to eating popcorn at the cinema.

== See also ==
- List of juices
