= Bloody Mary (cocktail) =

Cocktail of vodka and tomato juice

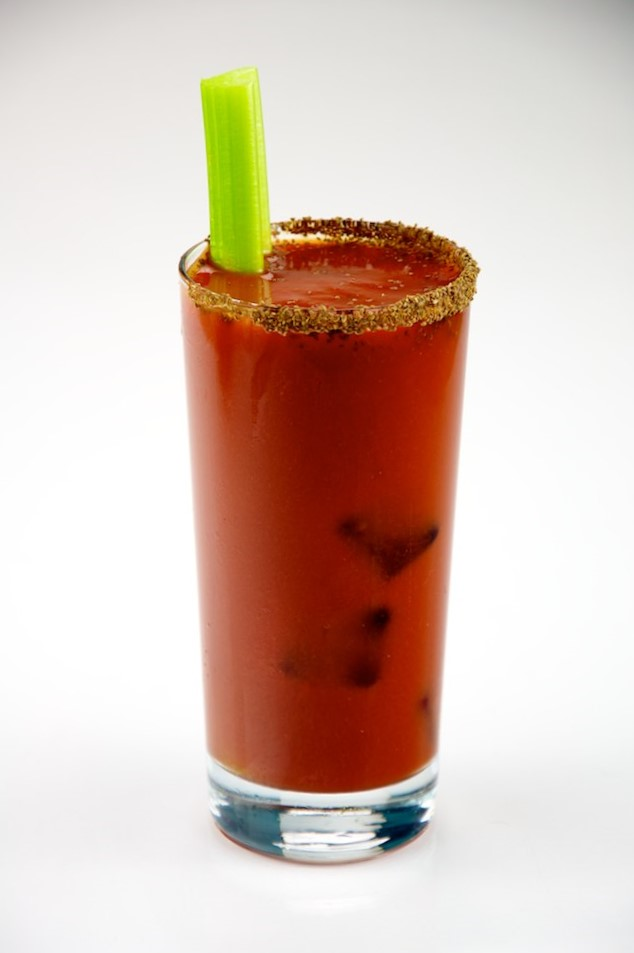
- A Bloody Mary garnished with celery served with ice cubes
- Type: Mixed drink
- Ingredients: 45 ml vodka; 90 ml tomato juice; 15 ml fresh lemon juice; 2 dashes of Worcestershire sauce; Tabasco sauce; Celery salt; Black pepper
- Standard drinkware: Highball glass
- Standard garnish: Celery and lemon wedge (optional)
- Served: On the rocks: poured over ice
- Preparation: Stir gently all the ingredients in a mixing glass with ice, pour into rocks glass.

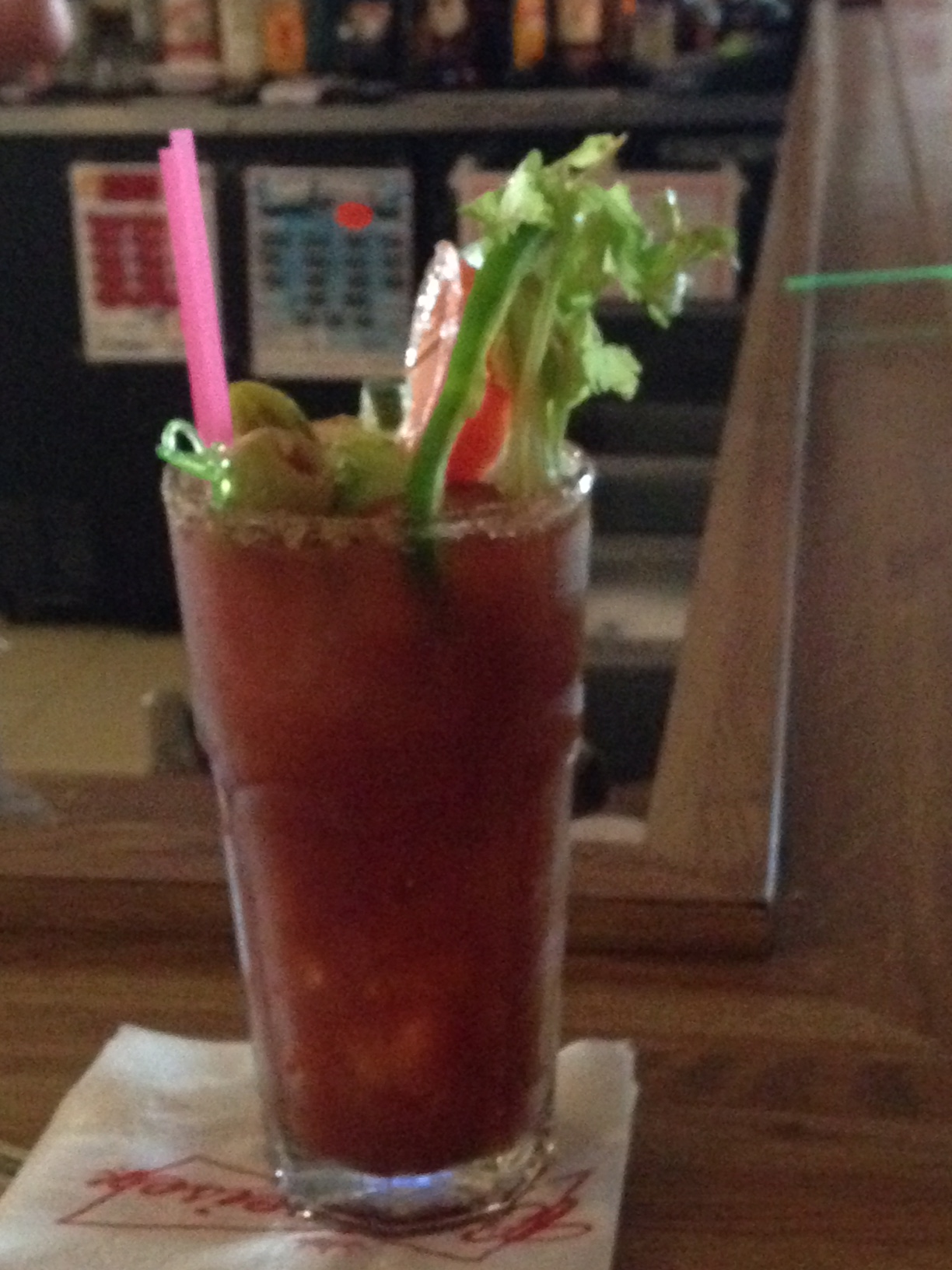
Bloody Mary

A Bloody Mary is a cocktail containing vodka, tomato juice, and other spices and flavorings including Worcestershire sauce, hot sauces, garlic, herbs, horseradish, celery, olives, pickled vegetables, salt, black pepper, lemon juice, lime juice and celery salt. Some versions of the drink, such as the "surf 'n' turf" Bloody Mary, include shrimp and bacon as garnishes. In the United States, it is usually consumed in the morning or early afternoon, and is popular as a hangover cure.

The Bloody Mary was invented in the 1920s or 1930s. There are various theories as to the origin of the drink and its name. It has many variants, most notably the Red Snapper (made with gin), Bloody Maria (made with blanco tequila), and the Virgin Mary (made without alcohol).

== History ==
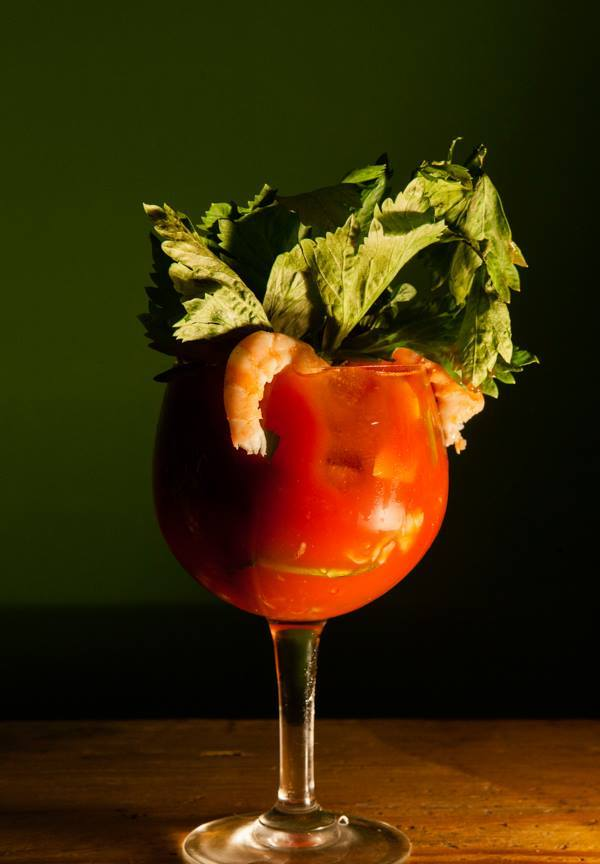
Seafood Bloody Mary

The French bartender Fernand Petiot is claimed to have invented the Bloody Mary in 1921, well before any of the later claims, according to both his granddaughter and his employer at the time, the New York Bar in Paris which later became Harry's New York Bar, a frequent Paris hangout for Ernest Hemingway and other American expatriates. The cocktail is said to have been created on the spur of the moment, according to the bar's own traditions, consisting only of vodka and tomato juice. It was originally referred to as a "Bucket of Blood." Harry's Bar also claims to have created numerous other classic cocktails, including the White Lady and the Side Car.

New York's 21 Club has two claims associated with it. One is that it was invented in the 1930s by bartender Henry Zbikiewicz, who was charged with mixing Bloody Marys. Another attributes its invention to the comedian George Jessel, who frequented the 21 Club. In 1939, Lucius Beebe printed in his gossip column This New York one of the earliest U.S. references to this drink, along with the original recipe: "George Jessel's newest pick-me-up which is receiving attention from the town's paragraphers is called a Bloody Mary: half tomato juice, half vodka."

In a 1939 publication by El Floridita called Floridita Cocktails a recipe called "Mary Rose" lists the main ingredients of a modern Bloody Mary. This booklet may be one of the earliest publications depicting the name Mary, while using the same ingredients in today's Bloody Mary.

Fernand Petiot claimed to have invented the modern Bloody Mary in 1934 as a refinement to George Jessel's drink, at the King Cole Room in New York's St. Regis Hotel, according to the hotel's own history. Petiot told The New Yorker in July 1964:

I initiated the Bloody Mary of today. Jessel said he created it, but it was really nothing but vodka and tomato juice when I took it over. I cover the bottom of the shaker with four large dashes of salt, two dashes of black pepper, two dashes of cayenne pepper, and a layer of Worcestershire sauce; I then add a dash of lemon juice and some cracked ice, put in two ounces of vodka and two ounces of thick tomato juice, shake, strain, and pour. We serve a hundred to a hundred and fifty Bloody Marys a day here in the King Cole Room and in the other restaurants and the banquet rooms."

The cocktail was claimed as a new cocktail under the name "red hammer" in Life magazine in 1942, consisting of tomato juice, vodka, and lemon juice. Less than a month later, a Life advertisement for French's Worcestershire Sauce suggested that it be added to a virgin "Tomato Juice Cocktail" along with tomato juice, salt, and pepper. The addition of salt to the alcoholic beverage was suggested that same year in a story in Hearst's International Combined with Cosmopolitan.

=== Origin of the name ===
Some drink aficionados believe the inspiration for the name was Hollywood star Mary Pickford. Others trace the name to a waitress named Mary who worked at a Chicago bar called the Bucket of Blood. The tradition at Harry's New York Bar in Paris, according to manager Alain Da Silva in a 2011 interview, is that one of the patrons for whom the cocktail was first mixed in 1920 or 1921 declared, "It looks like my girlfriend who I met in a cabaret"; the cabaret's name was the Bucket of Blood and the girlfriend's name was Mary, so the patrons and bartender Petiot agreed to call it a "Bloody Mary".

Alternatively, the name may have arisen from "a failure to pronounce the Slav syllables of a drink called Vladimir" in English. This gains some credibility from the anecdotal observation that the customer at the New York Bar for whom Petiot prepared the drink in 1920/21 was Vladimir Smirnov, of the Smirnoff vodka family.

The name "Bloody Mary" is associated with a number of historical figures, particularly Queen Mary I of England, who was nicknamed "Bloody Mary" due to the executions of Protestants during her reign.

== Preparation and serving ==
In the United States, the Bloody Mary is a common "hair of the dog" drink, reputed to cure hangovers with its combination of a heavy vegetable base (to settle the stomach), salt (to replenish lost electrolytes), and alcohol (to relieve head and body aches). Bloody Mary enthusiasts enjoy some relief from the numbing effects of the alcohol and placebo effect. Its reputation as a restorative beverage contributes to the popularity of the Bloody Mary in the morning and early afternoon, especially at brunches.

The Bloody Mary is traditionally served over ice in a tall glass, such as a highball, flared pint or hurricane glass. The two critical ingredients, vodka and tomato juice, are relatively simple; however, the drink almost never consists of these two ingredients alone. Among the more common additions to the juice base are salt or celery salt (either mixed in or as a salted rim), cracked pepper, hot sauce (such as Tabasco), citrus juices (especially lemon or lime), Worcestershire sauce, celery seed, horseradish, clam juice or olive brine, brown sugar or molasses, or bitters. Some or all of these ingredients can come pre-mixed with the tomato juice as a single "Bloody Mary mix" to which the vodka is added, or the drink may be hand-constructed by the bartender from raw ingredients according to the patron's preference. A common garnish is a celery stalk when served in a tall glass; other common garnishes include olives, cheese cubes, a dill pickle spear, lemon wedges, dried sausage, bacon, and shrimp (as the taste of the drink is often reminiscent of shrimp cocktail sauce).

In addition to the aforementioned more traditional ingredients, practically anything can be added to the drink itself or as a garnish according to the drinker's wishes or the bartender's or establishment's traditions. Some variations of the Bloody Mary served by restaurants are designed to be a meal as well as a drink, coming with massive "garnishes" on skewers inserted into the glass, including ribs, miniature hamburgers called "sliders", grilled or fried shrimp, kebabs, sandwich wedges, fruit slices, and even sashimi. The drink itself can be served in any of a variety of glasses, from wine glasses to schooners or beer steins, according to tradition or availability. It is a tradition in the upper Midwest, particularly in Wisconsin, to serve a Bloody Mary with a small beer chaser.

=== Variations ===
There is a considerable amount of variation available in the drink's construction and presentation including the use of different base spirits like bourbon, rye, tequila, or gin. With tequila, it is often called a Bloody Maria. Similar variations exist: with absinthe the drink is called a Bloody Fairy, with sake it's a Bloody Geisha, with the anise-flavored Arak it's the Bloody Miriam, and so forth.

Another notable variation is the Bull Shot, popular in the late '50s and '60s, which replaces tomato juice with beef bouillon or consommé.

==== Bloody Margaret ====
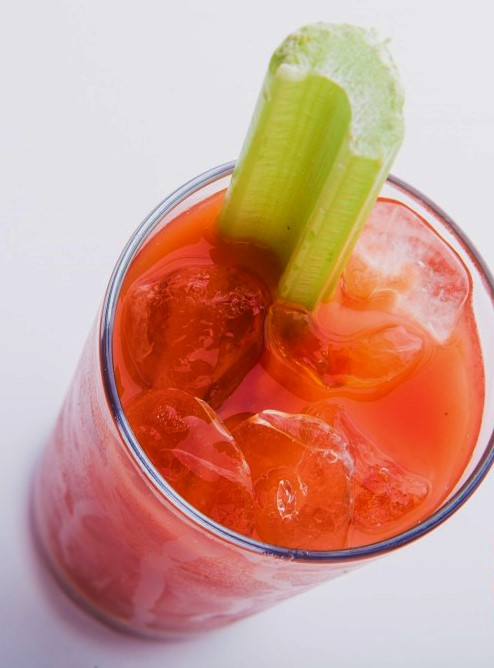
A plain Bloody Margaret, served in a highball glass with a celery stick

Bloody Margaret is a variation on the cocktail Bloody Mary, made with gin instead of vodka; it is also more often known as a Red Snapper or Bloody Gary in the United States. Ruddy Mary is an alternative name. According to web site FoodRepublic.com, the Red Snapper originated in post-Prohibition New York City. A French barman named Fernand “Pete” Petiot left Harry's New York Bar in Paris to work at the King Cole Room at the St. Regis Hotel in NYC. Petiot had been known in Paris for the tomato-juice-and-vodka cocktail, the Bloody Mary. Vodka was scarce then in New York, so Petiot swapped it for gin. The Astors, owners of the St. Regis, didn't like the name Bloody Mary, and thus Red Snapper (originally a fish) was chosen instead.

==== Virgin Mary ====
A "Virgin Mary", also known as a "Bloody Virgin", a "Virgin Bloody Mary", or "Bloody Shame", is a non-alcoholic cocktail, generally using the same ingredients and garnish as a Bloody Mary (according to local custom), but with the spirits replaced by additional tomato juice or prepared mix.

== See also ==
- Caesar (cocktail)
- List of cocktails
- Michelada
- Queen Mary (cocktail)
- Tomato beer
- Vampiro (cocktail)
