= Clamato =

Clam and tomato beverage

- 341 mL can of Mott's Clamato. The Canadian package artwork includes English and French languages.
- Type: Tomato juice/clam broth hybrid
- Manufacturer: Mott's (Keurig Dr Pepper)
- Distributor: Grupo Peñafiel (Mexico); Canada Dry Motts (Canada); Empire Bespoke Foods Ltd (UK)
- Origin: United States
- Introduced: 1966; 60 years ago
- Variants: Nutrimato; X-tra Spicy; The Works
- Related products: Kraut juice, Caesar
- Website: www.clamato.com/en/

Clamato (/kləˈmɑːtəʊ/, /kləˈmeɪtəʊ/, /kləˈmætoʊ/) is a commercial drink made of reconstituted tomato juice concentrate and sugar, which is flavored with spices, dried clam broth and MSG. It is made by Mott's. The name is a portmanteau of clam and tomato. It is consumed in Canada, Mexico, and to a lesser extent, the United States. It is very often mixed with alcohol to make a Caesar, a drink similar to a Bloody Mary.

== History ==
In 1935, The Clamato Corporation of New York produced "clam and tomato juice in combination".

In 1938, House & Garden magazine printed a recipe for "Tomato-Clam Juice Cocktail", consisting of tomato juice, clam broth, and salt.

In 1940, "Lobster King" Harry Hackney was granted the Clamato trademark. His Atlantic City restaurant, Hackney's, sold Clamato juice in cans.

In 1957, McCormick & Company, Inc. applied for, and later acquired, the Clamato brand name for the seasoned blend of tomato juice and clam juice. This trademark is still valid and now owned by Keurig Dr Pepper.

Clamato was produced in its current form beginning in 1966 by the Duffy-Mott company in Hamlin, New York, created by Francis Luskey, a chemist, and another employee working out of California who wanted to create a Manhattan clam chowder style cocktail by combining tomato juice and clam broth with spices. The employees named the new cocktail "Mott's Clamato" and secured the trademark for the new brand. The brand was owned by Cadbury-Schweppes after the company bought Mott's in 1982. As of 2008, it is owned by Keurig Dr Pepper after the business was spun off of Cadbury-Schweppes.

In recent years, the Clamato label was updated and no longer shows the image of a clam, an attempt by the manufacturer to downplay the seafood aspect of the beverage.

== Lawsuits ==
In 1998, Cadbury-Schweppes sued FBI Foods, a former contract manufacturer of Clamato, claiming that their brand "Caesar Cocktail" was proof of breach of confidence, claiming that the product used their recipe as a base. They brought the case to the Supreme Court of British Columbia. The initial ruling was appealed. The case reached the Supreme Court of Canada and it was ruled that FBI Foods would pay Cadbury-Schweppes $300,000 for revenue they lost in the first year of competition. It was reasoned that any juice maker would have been able to reverse-engineer the recipe within a year.

Since 2018, Keurig Dr Pepper has sued several companies who have been infringing on the Clamato trademark using the "mato" suffix to describe their version of the product. This is done in order to prevent the genericization of the trademark by making sure Clamato stays a distinctive brand name, as well as to preserve the brand image and identity.

== Consumption ==
Clamato is used primarily as a drink mix for alcoholic beverages (an estimated 60% of sales in the US in 2008), and it is popular for this in both Canada and Mexico, but less so in the United States (outside of Canadian-American and Mexican-American communities).

=== With vodka ===
In Canada, Clamato is primarily used to make a cocktail called a Caesar. It was reported by The New York Times in 2018, that one third of North America's supply of Clamato is consumed by Canadians, the majority of which is used to make Caesars. Since 2001, Cadbury Schweppes (now Canada Dry Motts) has been selling an alcoholic version of the beverage called the Clamato Caesar in the Canadian market.

=== With beer ===
Clamato is also added to beer in various beer cocktails, such as the michelada; the most basic is known as a "beer 'n clam", "Clam Eye", or "Red Eye" in Western Canada, which adds Clamato to pale lagers. In 2001, Anheuser-Busch and Cadbury-Schweppes introduced a premixed version called the "Budweiser and Clamato Chelada" in the United States.

Adding more spices (similar to those in a Caesar) results in what is called sangre de cristo (blood of Christ) in Mexico.

== Beefamato ==
Mott's once produced a similar beverage named Beefamato, made from beef broth and tomato juice.
