= Charles McCormick =

Charles McCormick may refer to:

- Charles T. McCormick (1889–1963), American university professor
- Charles McCormick (musician) (1946–2022) American musician with the band Bloodstone
- Charles Perry McCormick (1896–1970), American businessman and civic leader in Baltimore, Maryland

== See also ==
- Charles J. McCormack (1865–1915), American politician in New York City
- Charlie McCormack (1895–1975), Scottish footballer
