= Ducros =

Ducros may refer to:

== People ==
- Andy Ducros, English football player.
- Anne Ducros, French jazz singer.
- Françoise Ducros, Canadian politician.
- Michel Ducros, French businessman.
- Louis Ducros, short for Abraham-Louis-Rodolphe Ducros (Moudon, 21 July 1748 – Lausanne, 18 February 1810), Swiss painter.
- Pietro Ducros (1745 or 1748 – Lausanne, February, 1810), Swiss-Italian painter and engraver active in Rome, possibly the same as Abraham-Louis-Rodolphe Ducros

== Locations ==
- Ducros Plantation, historic Southern sugar plantation in Terrebonne Parish, Louisiana.
- Dr. Louis A. Ducros House, historic house in Saint Bernard, Louisiana.
- Louis Ducros House, historic house in Clearwater, Florida.

== Other ==
- Ducros, formerly a French distributor of spices and herbs, now a brand of McCormick & Company.
