= Camp Coffee =

Instant coffee syrup

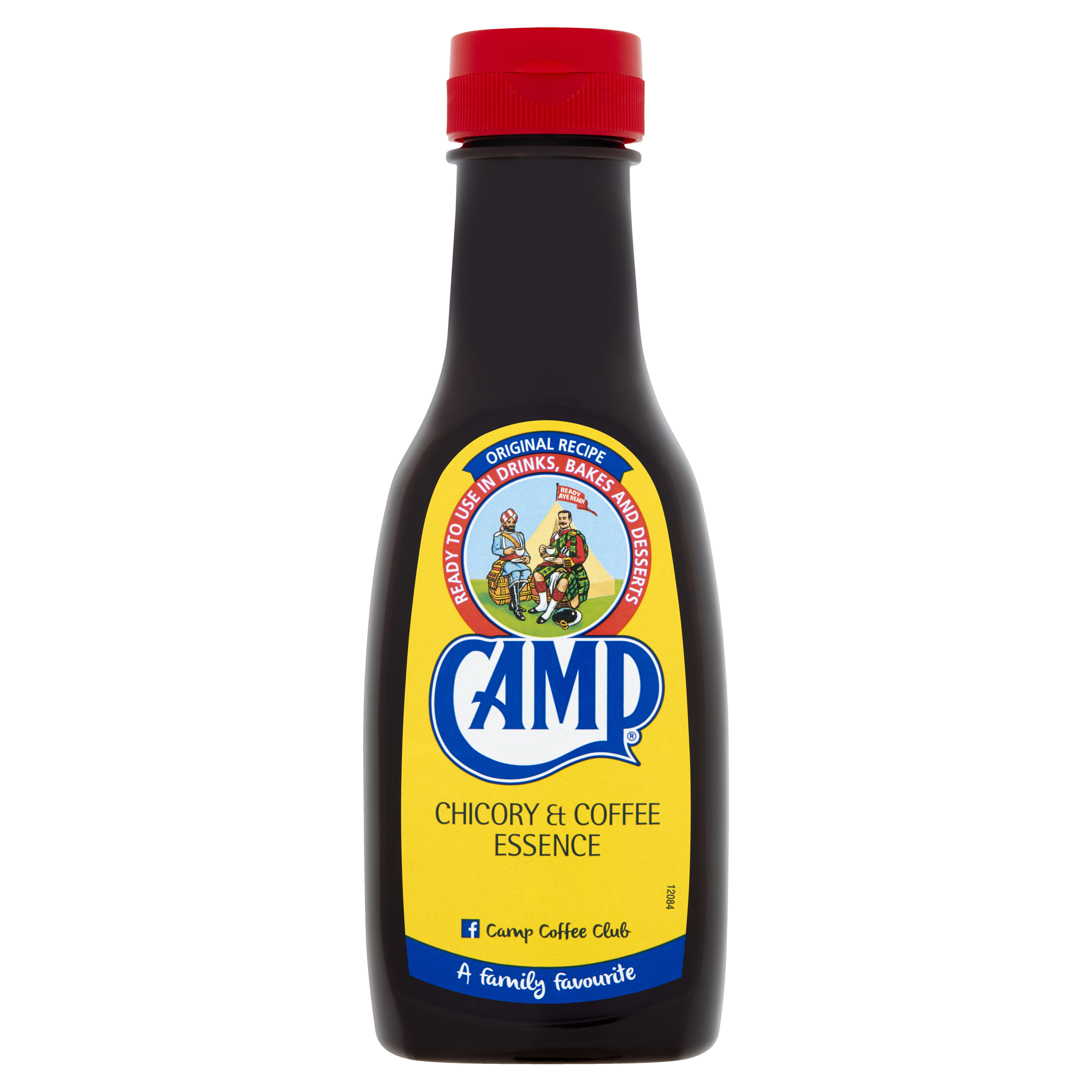
Camp Coffee

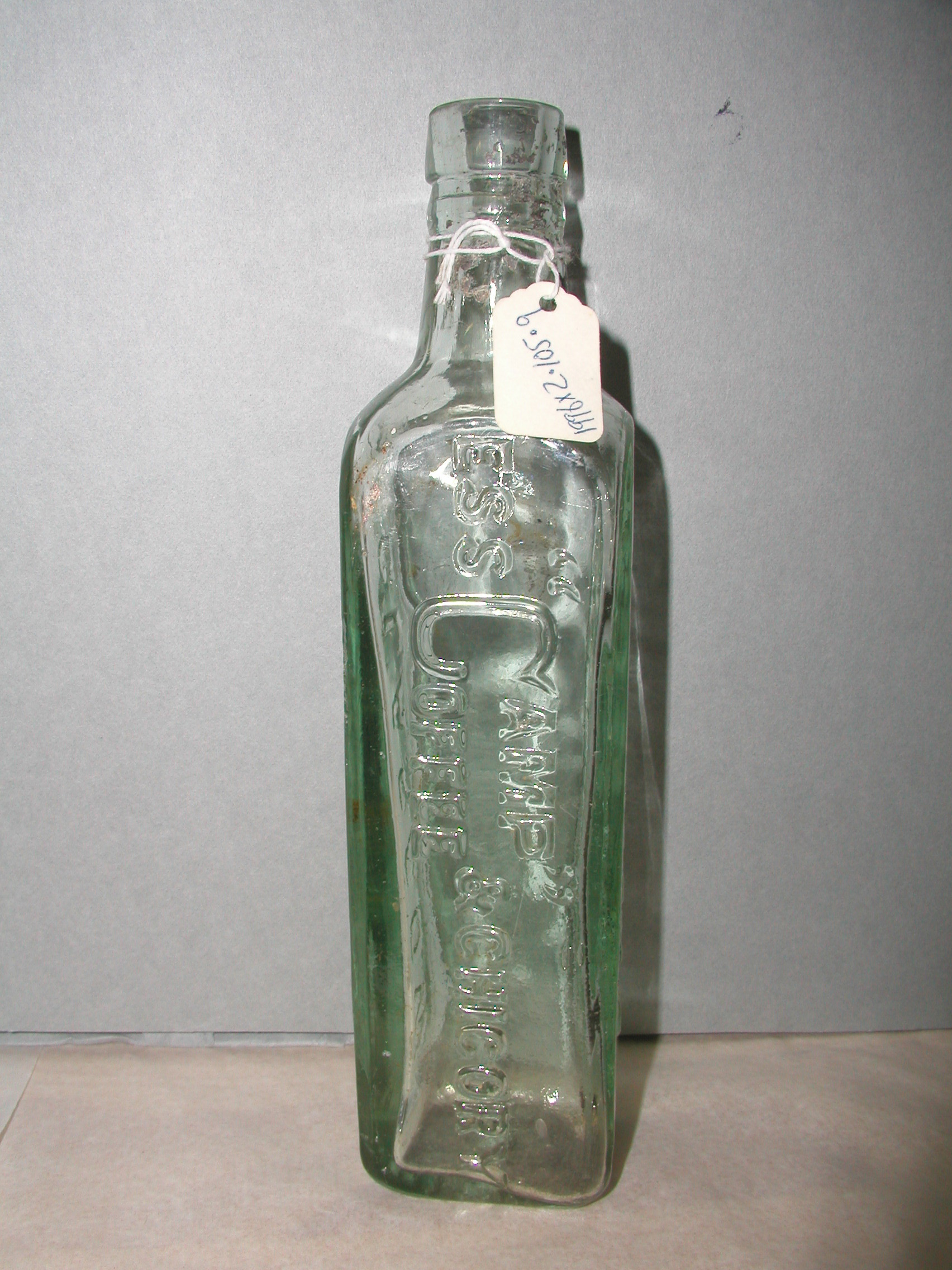
Paterson's 'Camp Coffee & Chicory' glass bottle

Camp Coffee is a brand of coffee-and-chicory syrup from the United Kingdom. Originally intended as a concentrate that could be diluted to make coffee for drinking, it has since been primarily used in baking. It was first produced in 1876 by Paterson & Sons Ltd, in Glasgow.

In 1974, Dennis Jenks merged his business with Paterson to form Paterson Jenks plc. In 1984, Paterson Jenks plc was bought by McCormick & Company. McCormick UK Ltd assimilated Paterson Jenks into the Schwartz brand. Camp is produced in Paisley, Renfrewshire.

== Description ==
The ingredients of Camp Chicory & Coffee are sugar, water, chicory extract (25%) and dried coffee extract (4%). Camp is a dark brown, syrupy liquid. It has a smooth flavour of chicory and coffee but with a very sweet, predominantly chicory aftertaste.

For drinking, Camp is generally mixed with hot water or with warm milk in much the same way as cocoa, or added to cold milk and ice to make iced coffee. It is commonly found in the baking aisles of supermarkets because it is also used as an ingredient in coffee cakes and other confectionery.

A similar product is Bushells Coffee & Chicory Essence, from Australia.

== History ==
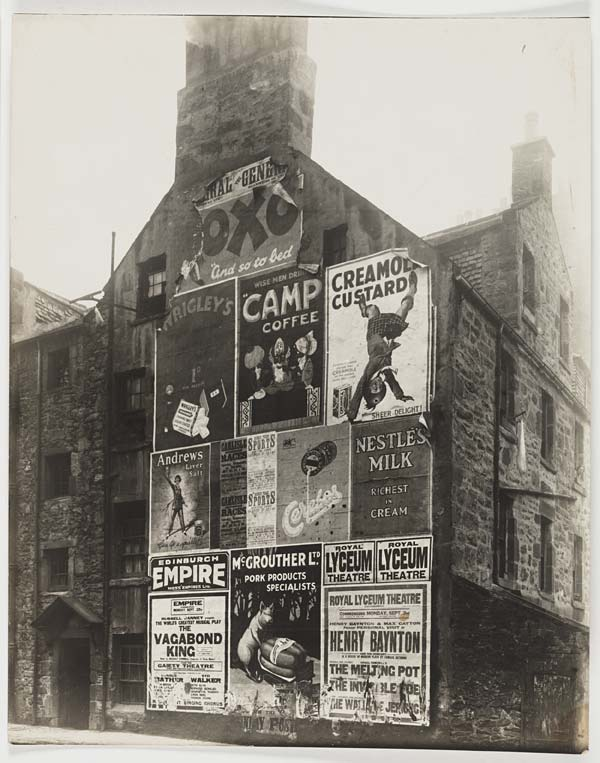
A Camp Coffee poster among other advertisements on a tenement building in 1929

Camp Coffee was created in 1885 by Campbell Paterson (1851–1927) of R. Paterson & Son in Glasgow. The company specialised in cordials, and their best-selling product was a raspberry cordial often added to whisky or brandy to create a drink known as "Cuddle-me-Dearie". The coffee essence was developed by Campbell Paterson for domestic use, to avoid the complex and then expensive equipment required for coffee drinking.

Legend has it (mainly due to the picture on the label) that Camp Coffee originated as an instant coffee for military use. The label has the classic theme of the romance of the British Raj. It includes a drawing of a seated Gordon Highlander (supposedly Major General Sir Hector MacDonald) being served by a Sikh soldier holding a tray with a bottle of essence and jug of hot water. They are in front of a tent, at the apex of which flies a flag bearing the drink's slogan, "Ready Aye Ready". That was also the motto of the 59th Scinde Rifles (Frontier Force) of the British Indian Army. In this context, the Scots word 'aye' has the meaning of 'always' rather than 'yes', and indicates, in the case of the drink, that it is 'always ready' to be made.

The original label, by William Victor Wrigglesworth, depicted a Sikh waiting on a seated Scottish soldier. A feature of that label was that the server carried a tray on which there was a bottle of Camp Coffee, which carried the same label showing a bottle of Camp Coffee, regressing to infinity (the Droste effect). A later version of the label, introduced in the mid-20th century, removed the tray from the picture (thus removing the infinite bottles) which was seen as an attempt to avoid the connotation that the Sikh was a servant, although he still waited while the kilted Scottish soldier sipped his coffee. Since 2006, the Sikh is depicted as a soldier sitting beside the Scottish soldier, with a cup and saucer of his own.

== Popularity ==
Camp Coffee is an item of British nostalgia, because many remember it from their childhood. It is still a popular ingredient for home bakers making coffee-flavoured cake and coffee-flavoured buttercream.

In late 1975, Camp Coffee temporarily became a popular alternative to instant coffee in the UK, after the price of coffee doubled due to shortages caused by heavy frosts in Brazil.

== See also ==
- Coffee milk
