= Auguste Fauchon =

- Born: 1856; Ellon, Calvados
- Died: 1945 (aged 88–89); Courbevoie, Hauts-de-Seine
- Occupation: Merchant

Auguste Félix Fauchon was a French food merchant who was born in Ellon (in the Calvados department) in 1856 and died in Courbevoie (near Paris) in 1939. He was the founder of the Fauchon gourmet food brand.

== Life and career ==
Arriving in Paris in 1885, Auguste Fauchon began his career at the market near la Madeleine with a cart offering the fruits and vegetables of his native Normandy, as well as the best orchards of France.

The next year, he opened a specialty food shop on the place de la Madeleine, featuring quality fresh groceries, poultry, cured meats, cheese, biscuits, candy, wine and spirits, all exclusively of French origin. Upon the immediate success of his business, he opened a bakery and cakeshop in 1895 and, only three years later, the "Grand Salon de Thé" (Grand Tea Salon) at 24 place de la Madeleine.

In 1900, he launched his "Grandes Caves de Réserves des Magasins Fauchon" (Grand Reserve Cellars of the Fauchon Shops) on rue de la Comète, within the quartier des Invalides. In the process, Fauchon, wanting to put his name on coffees, chocolates, teas, jams and biscuits to be sold abroad as well as at home, established himself as a leading distributor of French luxury foods.
