= Robert Hess =

Robert Hess may refer to:

- Robert Hess (cocktail enthusiast), American cocktail enthusiast, blogger and technology evangelist for Microsoft
- Robert Hess (chess player) (born 1991), American chess grandmaster
- Robert Hess (college president) (1932–1992), American historian and academic administrator
- Bob Hess (born 1955), Canadian ice hockey defenceman
- Bob Hess (wrestler) (1910–1998), American Olympic wrestler
- Robert Hess (artist) (1935–2014), American sculptor and art educator
- Robert G. Hess (1908–1995), American mechanical engineer and business executive
