= Spatini sauce mix =

Seasoning mix produced by Lawry's

Spatini sauce
- Commercial-sized 15 oz. Spatini package
- Type: Seasoning mix
- Place of origin: United States
- Region or state: Philadelphia, Pennsylvania
- Created by: Russell G. Lakoff and Harry Seidman
- Invented: 1952
- Main ingredients: Salt, sugar, onion, potato starch, spices (including red pepper, turmeric, black pepper), corn maltodextrin, garlic, beet (color), dextrose, yeast extract, guar gum, and carrot

Spatini sauce mix is a dry, packaged seasoning mix produced by Lawry's. Originally developed in the United States in 1952 to be added to other ingredients (such as crushed tomatoes or tomato puree, and ground meat) to make an Italian-style "spaghetti sauce", it is also used variously to make a dip, in meatloaf, to season meatballs, and more.

Its formulation includes (in descending order by weight) salt, sugar, onion, potato starch, spices (including red pepper, turmeric, black pepper), corn maltodextrin, garlic, beet (for color), dextrose, yeast, guar gum, and carrot.

The mix was manufactured and distributed originally by Spatini Co., subsequently by Unilever and its subsidiary Lipton Foods, prior to Lawry's, a subsidiary of spice giant McCormick Co.

== History ==
Spatini spaghetti sauce mix was originally developed and marketed by Russell G. Lakoff and Harry Seidman of Overbrook Hills, Pennsylvania, who registered their business in Philadelphia as Spatini Co. on September 4, 1952, selling the dry powdered mix packaged in boxes of three packets.

The Spatini Co. also manufactured a brown gravy mix that was sold under the Spatini brand. In 1962, Spatini spaghetti sauce added a version with tomatoes already included, which was discontinued.

Lipton, an Englewood Cliffs, New Jersey, subsidiary of Unilever, purchased Spatini Co. in 1976, and took over the manufacture, distribution, and marketing of the Spatini brand. Unilever shifted it from Lipton to its subsidiary Lawry's line in the mid-1980s, and Lawry's continued to promote and sell Spatini spaghetti sauce mix for home consumers, and introduce new recipes using the mix for commercial users.

Retail manufacturing of Spatini spaghetti sauce mix for home consumers ended in January 2007, but it continues to be manufactured and distributed commercially for restaurant and institutional use by Lawry's, which was sold by Unilever to McCormick & Company in 2008.

== Ingredients ==
At some point prior to the 1980s ingredients in earlier versions of Spatini spaghetti sauce included (in descending order by weight) sugar, salt, dehydrated onions, potato starch, spices and herbs, artificial color (beet and carrot powder), egg white powder, whey, monosodium glutamate (flavor enhancer), natural flavor, and vegetable gum. In the 1980s, Spatini spaghetti sauce listed ingredients as sugar, salt, dehydrated onion, potato starch, spices, natural flavors (contains dairy), garlic powder, maltodextrin, beet powder (for color), autolyzed yeast extract, and guar gum. In 2017, the listed ingredients for Spatini spaghetti sauce include salt, sugar, onion, potato starch, spices (including red pepper, turmeric, black pepper), corn maltodextrin, garlic, beet (color), dextrose, yeast extract, guar gum, and carrot. In 2022 the formulation was salt, sugar, onion, potato starch, spices (including red pepper, turmeric, black pepper), corn maltodextrin, garlic, beet (for color), dextrose, yeast, guar gum, and carrot.

== Nutritional information ==
The commercial version of Spatini spaghetti sauce mix lists a serving size of two teaspoons or six grams, which seasons a half cup when prepared. One serving contains 20 calories, 620 milligrams of sodium (26% Daily Value), 2 grams of sugars, 4 grams of carbohydrates (1% Daily Value), with no fat, protein, cholesterol, or fiber.

== Marketing ==
Spatini spaghetti sauce began to emphasize television advertising in 1964, when the company shifted its advertising agency from Weightman, Inc., to Firestone-Rosen, Inc. Because Firestone-Rosen had conflicting assignments from the Ronzoni company, Spatini moved its account to Ron Bloomberg Advertising in 1969, after which Spatini was advertised on broadcast media by singing the words "Spatini spaghetti sauce" to the tune of "La donna è mobile" from the opera Rigoletto.
