= Fauchon =

French gourmet food company

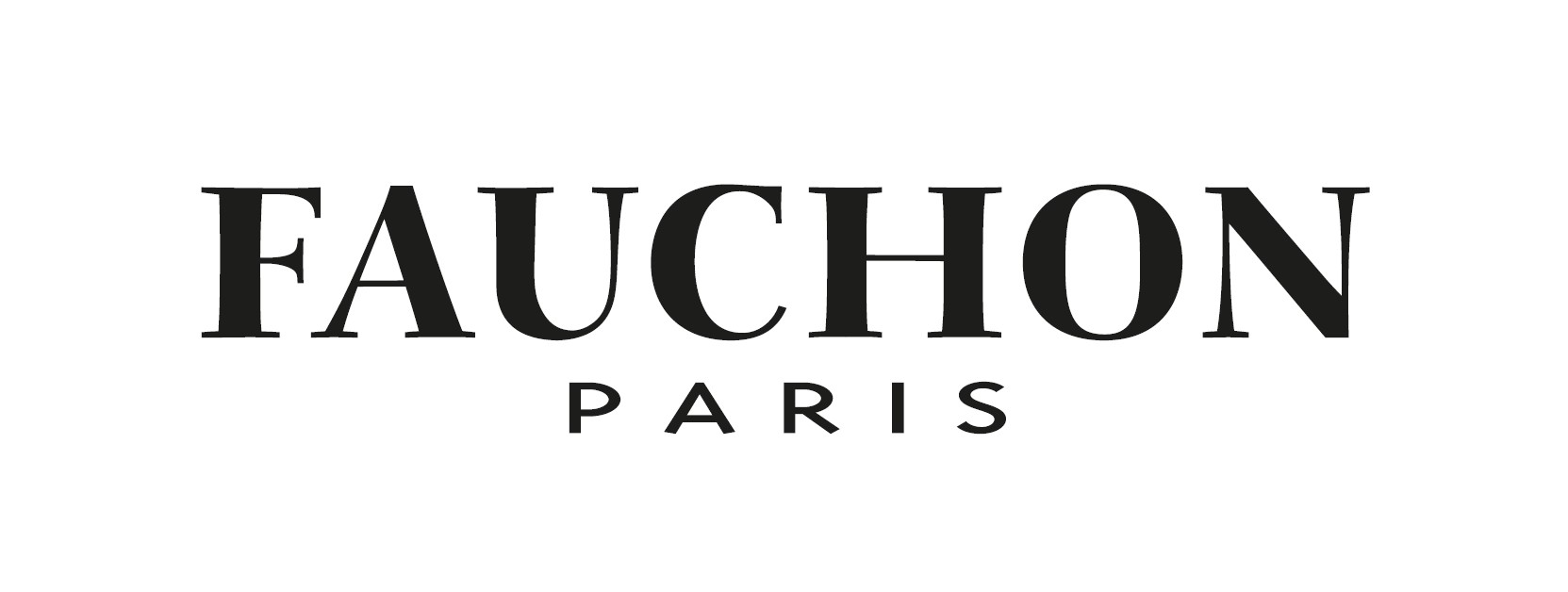

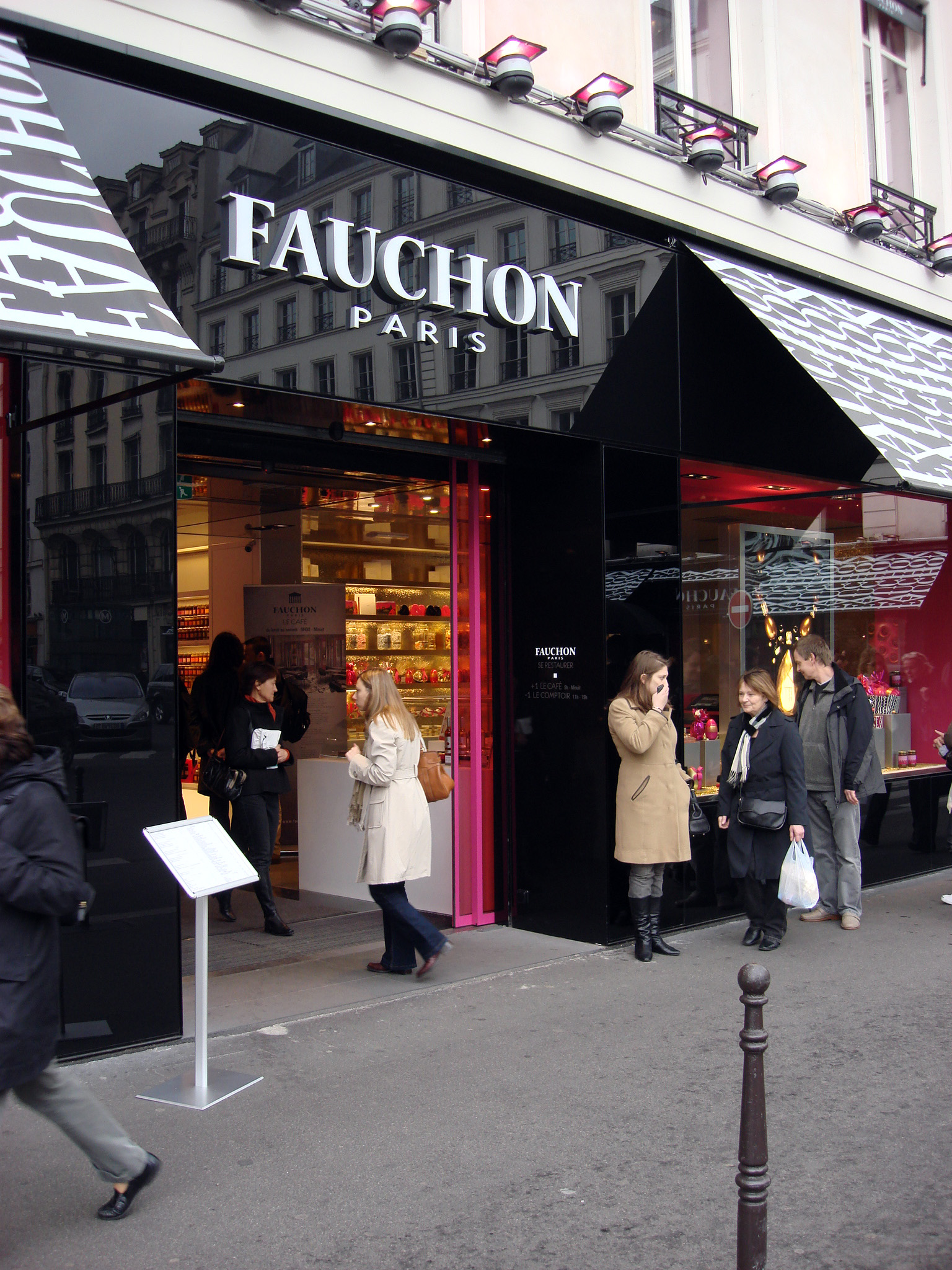
- The Fauchon store at Place de la Madeleine in Paris in 2008
- Industry: general food store
- Founded: 1886; 140 years ago
- Founder: Auguste Fauchon
- Headquarters: Paris, France

Fauchon is a French gourmet food and delicatessen company that was founded in 1886 in Paris, France. Fauchon is considered a major reference in contemporary French gourmet foods, and it had 81 outlets in operation around the world as of 2019.

== History ==
=== Origins from 1886 until 1952 ===
The founder of the Fauchon brand, Auguste Fauchon, was born in Ellon, Calvados, in 1856. He moved to Paris in 1880, where he began to work as a street vendor, moving on to become a wine and spirits merchant. In 1886, at the age of 30, he opened a fine foods outlet on Place de la Madeleine in the 8th arrondissement of Paris.

The quality of the products made by Fauchon and its numerous approved suppliers quickly made it well-known internationally, and it came to symbolise French-style luxury. In 1968, French radicals chose to raid Fauchon and distribute foie gras to the poor. During the Second World War, restrictions and rationing made business difficult for the company. Auguste Fauchon died in 1945, and his children sold the company in 1952.

=== From 1952 to 1998: exploring new opportunities ===
In 1952, Joseph Pilosoff, the former owner of "Chocolat Poulain", "Ciseaux d'argent" in Saint-Cloud and "Aux 100000 chemises" in Paris, took over Fauchon and built up a partnership with Air France. He also expanded the name abroad, opening new Fauchon outlets including in Japan at Takashimaya department stores in 1972. When Joseph Pilosoff died in 1981, his daughter took over at the head of the company. However, she too died soon thereafter, in December 1985, in a fire on the company premises.

In 1986, Joseph Pilosoff's granddaughter, Martine, and her husband, Philippe Prémat, became the owners of Fauchon. Martine Prémat's management proved difficult. Turnover had been flat since the beginning of the decade at around 250 million French francs (some €38 million), with losses of FF5 million in 1991, FF4.7 million in 1993 and FF11.9 million in 1996, and debt standing at FF73 million (€11 million) and a negative net equity of FF4.9 million.

The company strategy to sell its products in mass-market superstore chains such as Carrefour and Auchan, was sharply criticised, and the management was reproached with running the risk of spoiling the company's image, making it commonplace, and was also criticised for making management errors.

Despite attempts to expand the group in the 1990s by opening shops in Geneva and Saudi Arabia – only to close them a few years later – or by sponsoring the Paris Dakar rally, Martine Prémat finally sold the company to Laurent Adamowicz for FF240 million (€36.6 million) in March 1998, including the freehold of the buildings on Place de la Madeleine, sold the following year.

=== From 1998 to 2003: wide expansion of activities ===
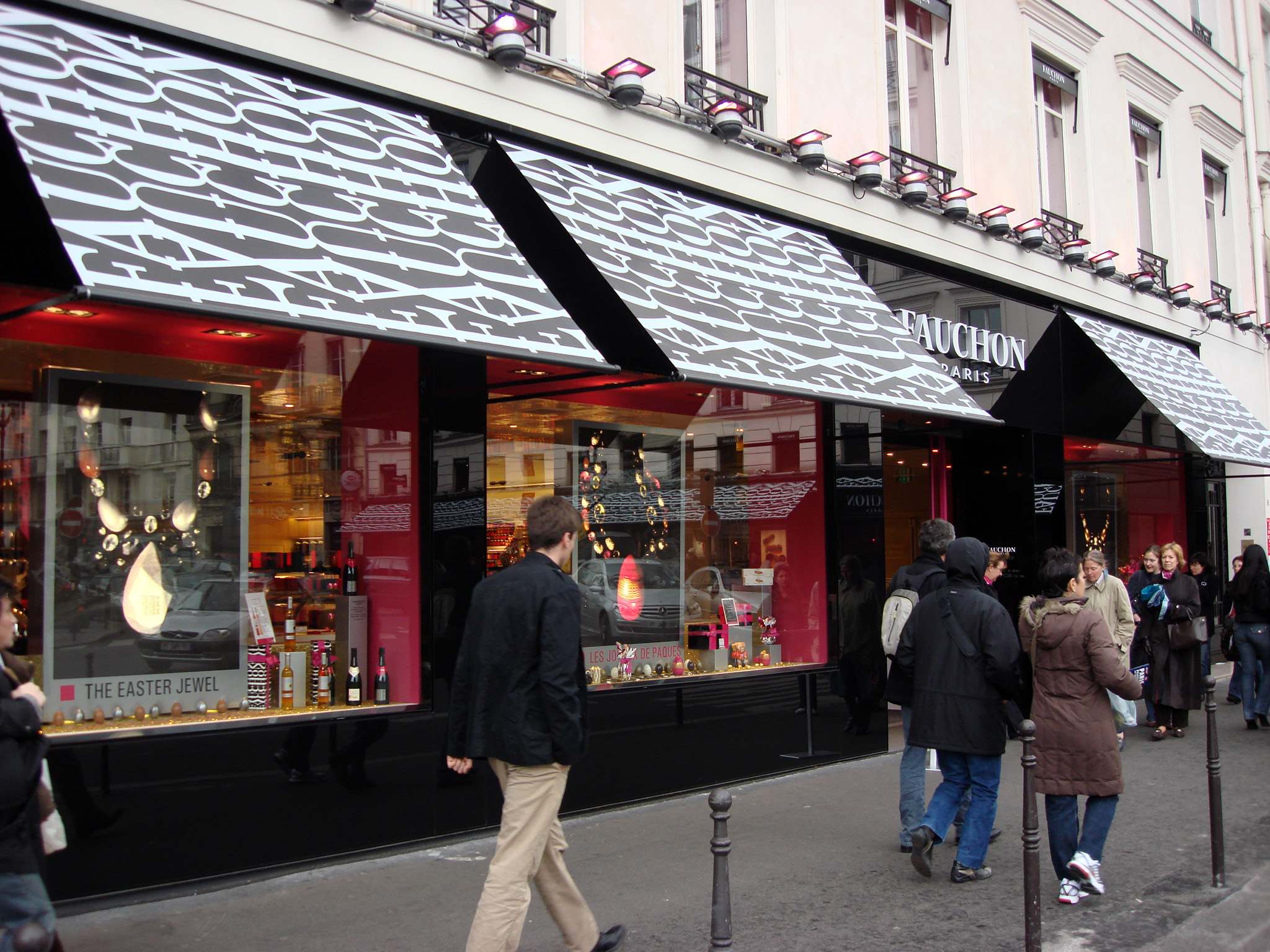
Fauchon (Place de la Madeleine, Paris)

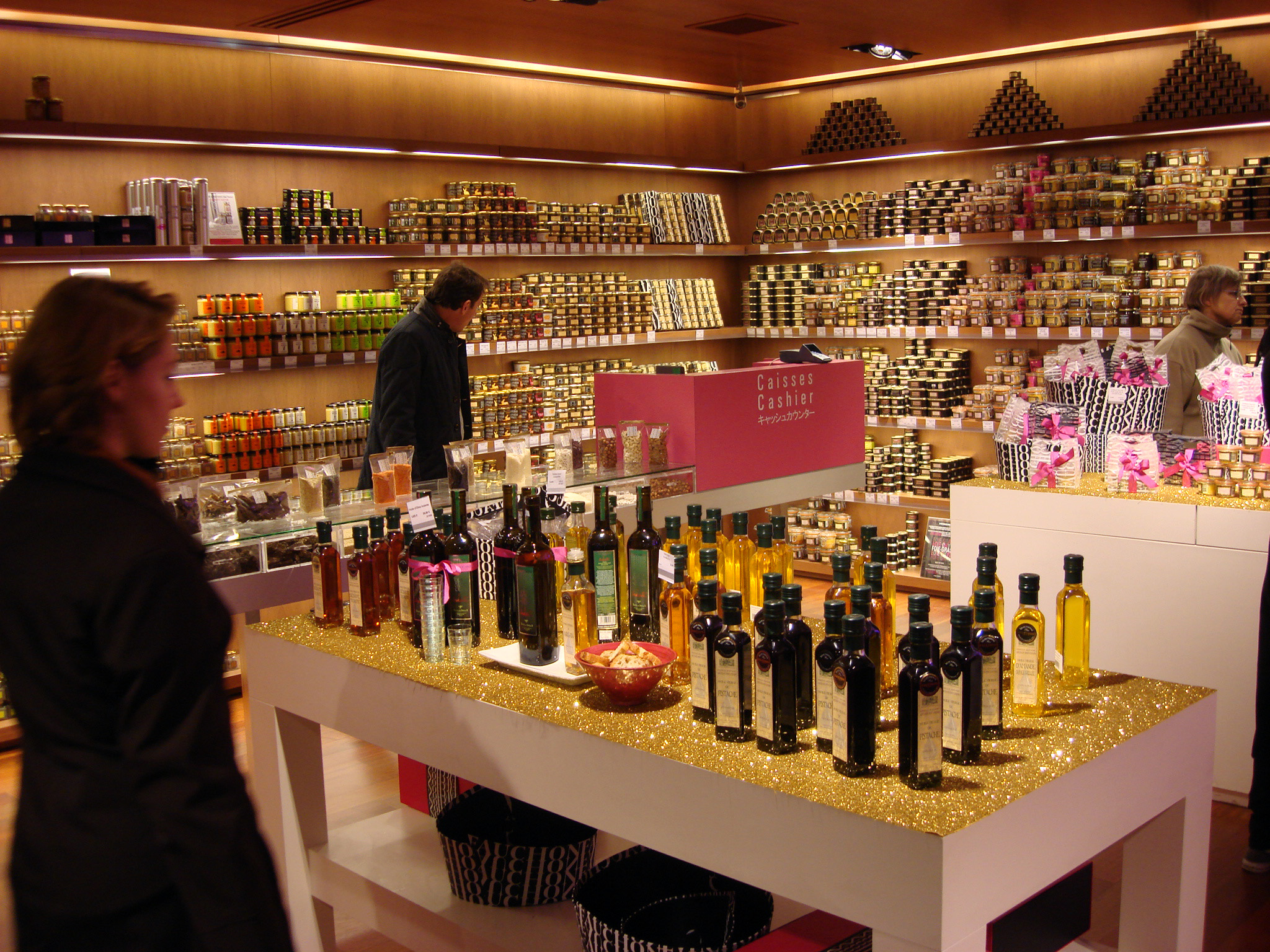
Inside the Fauchon store

Laurent Adamowicz, a former investment banker and business school graduate with experience in the field of luxury products, positioned the brand on the gourmet foods market. He launched new products and ad campaigns, renovated points of sale, withdrew the brand from mass-market outlets and renovated the historical Tea Salon on Place de la Madeleine. He started a new partnership with Air France, and promoted young pastry chefs, like Pierre Hermé, Sébastien Godard, Christophe Adam, Dominique Ansel.

In 2000, Fauchon became a growing and profitable company again, with 90 million Euros ($135 million) in sales and 5 million ($7.5 million) in EBIT for 2002. Fauchon opened new stores in Japan, in South Korea, Taiwan, the Middle East, Europe, and finally in the United States where it never had a store before, investing FF60 million (€9.2 million) in five years in the US market, with a diversified investor group that included Michel Deroy and Jean-Francois Toulouse, former owners and managers of Dock de France supermarkets, the investment fund Matignon Investissements et Gestion, the publicly listed UK fund Intermediate Capital Group, and Barclays Capital Development France. Barclays Private Equity France, a subsidiary of the Barclays plc Group, backed Laurent Adamowicz in his takeover of Fauchon to participate in its development in France and abroad.

In France, the acquisition of Flo Prestige delicatessens for €39 million increased the number of outlets in Paris by 12 stores. In 2003, the Fauchon network included 650 franchises, with 16 of its own shops, three in New York and 13 in Paris.

The acquisition of the Flo outlets in Paris in 2002 and the opening of three shops in New York led to a sharp rise in income between 1998 and 2004, but a decline in Fauchon's net profits. In the spring and summer of 2003, Fauchon, heavily in debt, was affected by the collapse of the tourism market with the combination of several events: the Iraq War and the fall of the Saddam Hussein regime in April 2003, followed in May 2003 with the severe acute respiratory syndrome (SARS) virus epidemic, and then the unprecedented heat wave in Europe that hit France particularly hard with over 15,000 dead in August 2003.

In January 2004, Laurent Adamowicz sold his interest in the company and left his CEO's office to Michel Ducros, one of the sons of Gilbert Ducros (1928–2007), the founder of the Ducros spice business.

=== Since 2004 ===
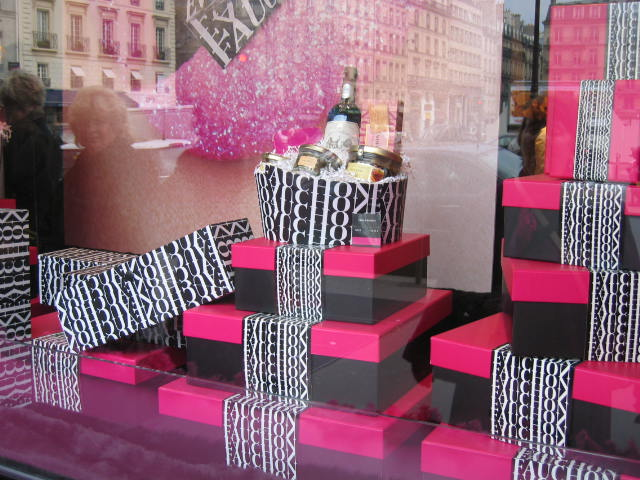
The Paris location of Fauchon dressed up for Christmas, 2004

From 2004 onwards, Michel Ducros bought out most of the other shareholders, private and institutional, and will acquire between 2005 and 2009 all of the shares held by the Barclays Group, the 36% stake owned by La Compagnie du Bois sauvage, the stake held by Matignon Investissement & Gestion, and lastly the minority shareholdings. "I am an entrepreneur, I invest in the long term," he explained.

In 2004, the new shareholders adopted a strategy that aimed to boost profits by selling off those assets they deemed to be non-strategic, closing stores in Russia and the United States, selling their ready-prepared meal tray business to the Fleury Michon group, and finally selling the Fauchon Paris stores to the company's rival Lenôtre. Within the space of 6 years, Fauchon cut back its workforce by 700 employees, from 900 to 200 people.

Michel Ducros revised Fauchon strategy with all its suppliers and set up a strict sourcing, to promote the French savoir-faire and develop exclusive recipes. Fauchon continues to produce most of its own breads, cakes, pastries and delicatessen products on its premises (in the Paris suburb of Courbevoie for cakes and pastries).

In 2013, after the departure of the CEO Isabelle Capron, Michel Ducros appointed Eric Vincent as CEO, which announced ambitious plans for the company, aiming to have 100 outlets by 2017 (from 63 in 2013), mostly in franchises.

Despite the lack of success in the United States and China in 2009, Fauchon still aimed at international development on several big markets (Japan, Middle East, Asia and South America). Fauchon had some 60 stores and restaurants around the world in 2013. Fauchon reinforced its presence through Asia in Hong Kong in 2014 and Thailand, and invested in North America, and the Middle East, where new openings are concentrated.

On the verge of bankruptcy in 2004 (with losses of €30 million), Fauchon made its way back to a smaller loss in 2009, and in 2013 posted an operating profit of €900,000 on sales of €50 million. In Fauchon employed 270 people, operated 76 retail outlets and posted sales revenue of €180 million (including sales by franchises), 80% of which in international markets. In June 2020, after many years of poor financial performance, Fauchon went into administration.

=== 2015: creation of Fauchon Hospitality ===
In September 2015, Fauchon adopted a new strategy and began developing a luxury hospitality branch. In March 2018, the company launched Fauchon Hospitality to develop a network of luxury boutique hotels around the world, with a focus on Japan, Europe and the Middle East. Fauchon Hospitality is headed by Jacques-Olivier Chauvin, previously CEO of Relais & Châteaux and SVP of Van Cleef & Arpels. Samy Vischel, president of Fauchon, is vice president of Fauchon Hospitality. Bernard Lambert is the international business advisor of the project; he was the president of the SBM and the Méridien company.

Fauchon partnered with the upscale hotel group Esprit de France, a subsidiary of Compagnie Lebon, to create and co-manage the first Fauchon L'Hôtel on the Place de la Madeleine in Paris in a building acquired by Qatar National Bank. It opened 1 September 2018. The five-star hotel is affiliated with Leading Hotels of the World.

Richard Martinet (Affine Design) was Fauchon's original interior designer, assisted by the Atelier Paluel Marmont, although the majority of the design work was carried out by architects DTACC. The hotel is managed by Jérôme Montantème. It presents a hotel concept created by Emmanuelle Mordacq, president of the agency NeoPlaces agency: the GLAM hotel: a Gourmet hotel (creative Parisian pastry associated with French culinary tradition), Located in the center of Paris (Place de la Madeleine, where Fauchon was created 130 years ago), offering personalized arty attentions and experiences, always in line with women "Mesdames" (sophisticated lighting, appropriately sized bathrobes, Carita toiletries and spa, etc.).

=== From 2018 to 2020: financial difficulties and closure of the historic store ===
On January 29, 2020, the Fauchon Receptions subsidiary was placed in compulsory liquidation followed on June 23, 2020, by the request for placement in receivership by the parent company which was pronounced the following week.

On July 10, 2020, a call for tenders was launched for a partial disposal plan.

On September 16, 2020, the Bobigny Commercial Court approved the company's continuation plan which provides for the closure of the historic shops at 24–26 and 30 Place de la Madeleine. Only the hotel, the Grand Café and the tea shop remain open. The closure of these two shops will cause 77 layoffs among the staff.

=== 2021: Kyoto hotel opening and resumption of activities ===
After seeing its continuation plan accepted in September 2020 and having closed its stores shortly after Fauchon began to relaunch its activities.

More than two years after the launch of the first Fauchon hotel in Paris, it was in Japan, in Kyoto, that the brand opened its second 5-star boutique hotel on March 16, 2021.

At the end of the year, the brand announced the upcoming opening of a third 5* hotel: FAUCHON The Riyadh Hotel in Saudi Arabia.

=== 2022: Training school ===
The brand has announced the opening of the Fauchon school with training in food and service trades, based in Rouen.

== Fauchon in figures ==
Financial data in million euros
Years	2000	2001	2002	2003	2004	2005	2006	2007	2008	2009	2010	2011	2012
Total Sales	39.1	41.4	38.7	54.0	84.2	70.7	43.8	36.0	35.6	36.6	44.3	45.5	46.2
Operating profits	1.5	1.5	−3.1	−3.4	−10.2	−10.7	−5.8	−1.1	−1.1	−0.2	−0.1	−0.3	0.1
Net profit or loss	0.1	1.3	−1.4	−4.5	−33.5	−15.9	−5.8	−0.8	−5.4	−1.0	−1.0	−1.0	−0.5

== Competition ==
Main competitors of Fauchon on the worldwide gourmet and luxury food products scene include Harrods and Fortnum & Mason in London, and Mariage Frères, Palais des Thés, Dammann Frères, Kusmi Tea, Dalloyau, Lenôtre, Pavillon Ledoyen and Hédiard in Paris. Many more competitors emerged in the last decade on the international scene. For instance, Maison Kayser had 20 outlets in Paris, 25 in Japan and approximately 140 internationally as of 2015. Ladurée also boasted about 100 outlets in 2015 – 25 in Paris and the rest in 20 countries. As for Lenôtre, the world-renowned company founded by Gaston Lenôtre, it had 37 stores in 8 countries as of 2015.

In addition, former Fauchon pastry chefs Pierre Hermé, Dominique Ansel and Christophe Adam each opened their own shops competing with Fauchon in the pastry department. Pierre Hermé alone had 37 stores in 7 countries as of 2015.

== In popular culture ==
In the TV Show Lifestyles of the Rich and Famous (1986), Fauchon was mentioned in their 1986 Worlds Best Episode.

In Thomas Harris's book Hannibal (1999), the infamous fictional serial killer Hannibal Lecter, while on a flight from Europe to America, waits until everyone is asleep before producing a Fauchon food parcel of aromatic truffled pate de foie gras and Anatolian figs, as well as a half bottle of St Estephe, which Harris says he favours.

In Cast Away, the 2000 movie directed by Robert Zemeckis, FedEx executive Chuck Noland (played by Tom Hanks) hands his colleagues a Fauchon bag containing fresh baguette bread from Paris before they board a plane. The distinctive Fauchon logo of the bag stands out.
