= Charles Perry McCormick =

American businessman

Charles Perry McCormick (June 9, 1896 – June 16, 1970) was an American businessman and civic leader active in Baltimore, Maryland. At age 36, he became president of McCormick & Company, which he led for 23 years, building it into an international spices and flavorings company. He became known for his progressive Multiple Management system and his civic involvement in the city of Baltimore and the state of Maryland at large.

== Biography ==
Born in Morelia, Mexico in 1896, McCormick was the son of the Baptist missionary Hugh Pendleton McCormick and Anne Pauline (Perry) McCormick. He lived with his family in Mexico, Puerto Rico, Birmingham, Alabama, Paris and back in the States in Baltimore. After regular education in those places, he finished his secondary schooling in the Class of 1915 at The Baltimore City College, an all-boys institution, the nation's third oldest public high school, founded in 1839, and then located in its second building on the site at North Howard and West Centre Streets. He later graduated from The Johns Hopkins University in 1919, when in its first years at its new campus at Homewood in north Baltimore.

After graduation, McCormick started a regular four-year apprenticeship in a factory and the offices of McCormick & Company, his uncle's spice firm. McCormick had already earlier started part-time in the summer of 1912 as a shipping department clerk. After gaining sales experience in the Middle West and the Pacific Coast section, McCormick was appointed head of the import-export department in Baltimore. In 1928 he was promoted vice president, and after the death of his uncle Willoughby M. McCormick in 1932, he was elected president of McCormick & Company. McCormick retired in 1969 and was named Chairman Emeritus.

McCormick participated in a series of business and civic affairs. He was a member of the board of the Federal Reserve Bank of Richmond in 1939 and its chairman in 1952; chairman of the Board of Regents of the University of Maryland; director of several banks in and around Baltimore; and National Councilor to the Chamber of Commerce of the United States.

In 1960, McCormick was awarded the 1960 Henry Laurence Gantt Medal by the American Management Association and the ASME. Robert G. Hess, chairman of the Gantt Medal Board of Award, gave a presentation, that the award was offered to him for being "a dynamic leader in business; a successful practitioner of modern principles of scientific management and a valuable contributor of accepted improvements to the management profession, encompassing the humanities without sacrifice of profitable corporate performance and in addition, to influential leadership in the local community and national affairs." President and General Manager, Wright Machinery Company, Division of Sperry Rand Corporation, will make the presentation.

He was also selected for the Alumni Hall of Fame for his high school, The Baltimore City College.

== Early life ==
Charles Perry McCormick was born on June 9, 1896, in Morelia, Mexico. The son of Baptist missionary Reverend Hugh Pendleton McCormick and Anne Pauline McCormick (née Perry), he had two older siblings, Catherine (Katie) and Hugh. Following his peripatetic father, he attended primary school in Puerto Rico (where his father founded the University of Puerto Rico); grammar school in Birmingham, Alabama, and Boston, Massachusetts; and high school in Paris, France; Hamilton, Virginia; and Baltimore, Maryland. He matriculated to Baltimore's Johns Hopkins University in 1916, but his studies were interrupted by the Great War.

== Naval career ==
McCormick was enlisted in the United States Navy on April 6, 1917. He served aboard the U.S.S. W. A. Edwards and the U.S.S. Edgar F. Luckenbach. He also served as the naval athletic director, Fifth Naval District, for nine months.

== Return to Baltimore ==
After his short naval career, McCormick returned to Johns Hopkins in 1919 to complete his education. Upon graduation, he went to work full-time for his uncle Willoughby M. McCormick's business, McCormick & Co., where he had already worked summers as a high school and college student.

== Background ==
McCormick and Co. was founded in 1889 by Willoughby M. McCormick. The elder McCormick is said to have run the company with an "iron hand" and during the Great Depression he cut salaries across the board, first by 25%, then a further 10%. Upon his sudden death in 1932, the company's directors tapped 36-year-old Charles McCormick to replace his uncle.

== Career ==
The younger McCormick worked his way from hauling crates to vice president. Along the way he had moved up to sales, to supervising four sales offices, to opening the West Coast markets. (According to The American Weekly, McCormick disliked the "too-dingy or too-shiny reception rooms" he often waited in during his years traveling for McCormick & Co. Later, after becoming president of the firm, he remade the seventh floor of McCormick's factory building into a replica of an Elizabethan English village street, including a teahouse where tea would be served to guests.)

Upon being named president of McCormick & Co., Charles McCormick promptly raised salaries 10%, cut the work week from 56 hours to 45, and solicited suggestions for improvements. These actions raised morale and brought McCormick & Co. into the black for the first time in four years. He would soon transform the company's top-down organizational structure with a plan he called Multiple Management.

== Multiple Management ==
Multiple Management was a profit-sharing plan designed as a way to develop and promote leaders from within the organization, as well as to solicit input from a wider cross-section of employees. The American Weekly called it a "most extraordinary industrial democracy". A junior board made of young executives, a factory board made of foremen and section heads, and a board of salesmen would propose recommendations to improve materials, packaging, processes, sales, and advertising. These would be reviewed by a senior board, which approved the vast majority of the proposals. A joint Combined Board would facilitate communication among all the other boards.

Under Multiple Management, more than 7,000 suggestions were sent from the junior board to the senior board between 1932 and 1948. Suggestions ranged from new bottles and tins, "snappier" labels, and improvements in machinery, inventory, and quality control. In that time, sales rose from US$3.25 million to US$26 million, and by 1935 McCormick was the largest spice and flavoring-extract business in the U.S. By 1962, net sales amounted to US$50 million yearly.

McCormick collated his ideas in two books: Multiple Management in 1937, and a follow-up, Power of People, in 1949. He wrote:

"Too many bankers and industrialists associate with their own clique exclusively; too many labor men travel only with their fellows. There's nothing wrong with capitalism, but there's a lot wrong with some of the people who use it. American living is the best the world has ever seen. But of what lasting use will it be if we do not learn how to get along better with one another?"

That same year, Business Week reported: "To this date, more than 500 companies in 46 countries have made inquiries or adopted the MM plan."

== Retirement ==
McCormick retired as president of McCormick & Co. in 1955. He stayed on as chairman of the company until August 1969.

=== Civic engagement ===
McCormick was very active in civil life, serving on dozens of boards and volunteer organizations. In a dryly appreciative biographical sketch subtitled "Man With A Mission" in Baltimore magazine, G. H. Pouder wrote, "Charles Perry McCormick believes that achievement comes only with serving and for that reason has tackled an appalling list of jobs for the public good, which can only be described as headaches of the first water." Similarly, his obituary in The Evening Sun began, "It took 69 lines of type in Who's Who to list Charles P. McCormick's memberships, awards and attainments and only the more important ones at that."

Among his more notable accomplishments, he was selected to represent U.S. management at the conference of the International Labor Organization in Geneva, Switzerland from 1949 to 1952; he was also vice chairman of the conference in 1955. He also served as chairman of the Civic Center Commission of Baltimore. He was appointed a member of the Board of Regents of the University of Maryland under three consecutive governors from 1948 to 1966. A lover of football, he was one of the businessmen who helped establish the Baltimore Colts and served as chairman of the first Colts Football Club, and he set up an annual award to the "Unsung Hero" of Maryland interscholastic football.

== Personal life ==
McCormick married Marion Andrews Hinds on October 14, 1921. They had two children, Rosalie Anne and Charles Perry, Jr. They divorced in November 1943, and later that month, on November 27, McCormick married Anne Wollman McPhail in New York. They had two more children, John Grayson and Robert Neville. At the time of his death he was survived by seven grandchildren.

McCormick painted seascapes, drew his own Christmas cards, and carved wooden statuettes as gifts.

== Death ==
On June 14, 1970, McCormick suffered a heart attack and was taken to University Hospital in Baltimore. He died on June 16, 1970, at 5 p.m.

In an appreciation, The Evening Sun wrote:

"The stories such a man leaves behind are many and, again and again, favorable. The tycoon who genuinely wanted to be called by his first name, by anybody: who likes for his executives to live in the same uniform housing district; who in the old Baltimore tradition wasn't afraid to list his uptown apartment and his Sherwood Forest place in the phone book - this was a man who bartered in teas, spices and humanity, whom lived his ideals to the full by his word and even more abundantly, by his example."

== Publications ==
- McCormick, Charles Perry. Multiple management. Harper, 1938.
- McCormick, Charles Perry. Multiple Management: A Plan for Human Relations in Industry. Funk & Wagnalls, 1948.
- McCormick, Charles Perry. The power of people: multiple management up to date. Harper, 1949.
- McCormick, Charles Perry. The Power of People. Bantam Books, 1952
