= Kamis =

Polish manufacturer of teas and spices

Kamis S.A.
- Company type: Private
- Industry: Food
- Founded: 1991
- Products: Spices, mustard, ketchup, breading, marinades, vinegar, salt, tea
- Brands: Kamis, Galeo, Irving Tea
- Number of employees: 1300

Kamis S.A. is a Polish manufacturer of spices, mustard, ketchup, breading, marinades, vinegar, salt, tea. Most of the products are sold under the brand names Kamis or Galeo, Tea – under the brand name Irving Tea.

The company was founded in 1991. Apart from Poland it is active in other markets in Eastern Europe, the former Soviet Union, as well as in Germany and the USA. Kamis is employer for 1300 workers. Kamis is Polish market leader in the production of spices. The division of the company dealing with spices and mustard was sold to U.S.-based spice manufacturer McCormick & Company in 2011.
