= Lawry's and Adolph's =

American food company

Lawry's spice blends

Lawry's and Adolph's are food, seasoning, and beverage brands owned by McCormick & Company, and formerly owned by Unilever and Lawry's. Products include marinades, spice blends, breadings, Spatini sauce, and other seasoning mixes.

== Products ==
=== Adolph's meat tenderizers ===
- Marinade in Minutes, Meat Marinade Seasoning Mix
- Unseasoned Tenderizer
- Seasoned Tenderizer

=== Herbs and spices ===
- Bay Leaves
- Casero Basil
- Casero Bay Leaves
- Casero Ground Black Pepper
- Casero Cayenne Pepper
- Casero Chili Powder
- Casero Chopped Onion
- Casero Cinnamon Sticks
- Casero Curry Powder
- Casero Garlic Powder
- Casero Ground Cinnamon
- Casero Ground Cumin
- Casero Onion Powder
- Casero Paprika
- Casero Parsley Flakes
- Casero Smoked Paprika
- Casero Whole Oregano
- Chili Powder
- Garlic Powder
- Ground Cayenne Pepper
- Ground Cinnamon
- Ground Cumin
- Onion Powder
- Oregano Leaves
- Paprika
- Parsley Flakes

=== Marinades ===
- Baja Chipotle Marinade
- Caribbean Jerk with Papaya Marinade
- Chipotle Molasses Marinade
- Hawaiian with Tropical Fruit Juices Marinade
- Herb & Garlic with Lemon Marinade
- Hickory Brown Sugar Marinade
- Honey Bourbon Marinade
- Lemon Pepper with Lemon Marinade
- Mediterranean Herb & White Wine Marinade
- Mesquite with Lime Marinade
- Sesame & Ginger Marinade
- Signature Italian with Garlic, Onion & Herbs Marinade
- Steakhouse Marinade
- Steak & Chop Marinade
- Korean-Style BBQ Marinade
- Teriyaki with Pineapple Juice Marinade

=== Spice blends ===
- 25% Less Sodium Garlic Salt with Parsley
- Black Pepper Seasoned Salt
- Casero Adobo with Pepper
- Casero Asobo Seasoning without Pepper
- Casero Carne Asada Seasoning
- Casero Chili & Lime Seasoning
- Casero Pollo Asado Sesoning
- Casero Total Seasoning
- Garlic Pepper
- Garlic Powder
- Coarse Ground with Parsley Garlic Salt
- Garlic Spread
- Lemon Pepper Blend
- Salt-Free 17 Seasoning
- Colorful Coarse Ground Blend Seasoned Pepper
- Seasoned Salt
- 25% Less Sodium Seasoned Salt

=== Seasoning mixes ===
- AU Jus Gravy Mix
- Beef Stew Seasoning Mix
- Burrito Seasoning Mix
- Chicken Fajita Seasoning Mix
- Chicken Taco Spices & Seasonings
- Chili Spices & Seasonings Mix
- Extra rich & Thick Spaghetti Mix
- Fajitas Spices & Seasonings
- Spaghetti Mix
- Taco Seasoning Mix
- Tenderizing Beef Marinade Spices & Seasoning Mix
