= August Schilling =

- Born: February 1854; Bremen, Germany
- Died: August 1934 (aged 80)
- Occupation: Entrepreneur
- Years active: 1870-1934
- Known for: Schilling’s Best, Schilling spices

August Schilling (born 1854) was an American entrepreneur who founded the San-Francisco-based A. Schilling & Company.

== Biography ==
Schilling was born in Bremen in February 1854. He left Germany when he was 16 and settled in San Francisco, California. There he worked for the coffee company J.A. Folger & Co. Due to his skills and ambition, he rose to become a partner in the company after only five years. He bought the shares of Otto Schoemann, a wealthy merchant who was initially brought in as a partner after a $10,000 investment. In 1878, the company was renamed as Folger-Schilling Company.

In 1881, Schilling broke with Folger and together with George Volkmann, a friend and fellow German immigrant, established A. Schilling and Company, a coffee roasting business. Schilling had a two-thirds interest in the new company. The enterprise, which was also an extract house, was located at the Second and Harrison Streets. Aside from coffee, the company offered teas and spices, so that Schilling and Volkman became known as the “spice boys”.

Among Schilling's notable products was the Schilling's Best, a baking powder that became popular all over the United States. It is considered a forerunner of the green movement as it was sold without any additives. By 1907, Schilling had expanded his business nationally. Schilling was known for introducing novel marketing initiatives. In 1911, he had a Wiseman aeroplane drop some of the Schilling coffee products including the Schilling's Best Three Star Coffee in a Santa Rosa community.

Schilling was characterized as one devoted to his business but also patronized the arts. He is known for his love of music and would often regal visitors with the song Die Wacht am Rhein.
