= Schiff Nutrition International =

American pharmaceutical company

- Trade name: Schiff Vitamins
- Formerly: Weider Nutrition International (1936–2005)
- Industry: Pharmaceutical
- Founded: 1936; 90 years ago in Salt Lake City, Utah, U.S.
- Founder: Joe Weider
- Headquarters: Salt Lake City, U.S.
- Products: Airborne; MegaRed; Move Free; Tiger's Milk; Digestive Advantage
- Owner: Reckitt Benckiser (since 2012)
- Website: www.schiffvitamins.com

Schiff Nutrition International, also known as Schiff Vitamins, is a company based in Salt Lake City. Schiff Nutrition is the manufacturer of dietary supplements such as Airborne, MegaRed, and Move Free. It was founded in 1936 as Weider Nutrition International. Since 2012, it has been a subsidiary of Reckitt Benckiser.

== History ==
=== Weider Nutrition International (1936–2005) ===
Weider Nutrition International was founded by Joe Weider in 1936. As Weider Nutrition, they were the creators of Tiger's Milk nutrition bars, and related products, one of the earliest lines of sports foods.

Weider was ordered to offer a refund to 100,000 customers of a "five-minute body shaper" that was claimed to offer significant weight loss after just minutes a day of use. The claims, along with misleading "before and after" photographs, were deemed false advertising by a Superior Court Judge in 1976.

In 1984, the FTC charged that ads for Weider's Anabolic Mega-Pak (containing amino acids, minerals, vitamins, and herbs) and Dynamic Life Essence (an amino acid product) had been misleading. The FTC complaint was settled in 1985 when Weider and his company agreed not to falsely claim that the products could help build muscles or be effective substitutes for anabolic steroids. They also agreed to pay a minimum of $400,000 in refunds or, if refunds did not reach this figure, to fund research on the relationship of nutrition to muscle development.

In 1997, Weider Nutrition International was listed on the New York Stock Exchange (NYSE) under the ticker symbol WNI.

In 2000, Weider Nutritional International settled another FTC complaint involving false claims made for alleged weight loss products. The settlement agreement called for $400,000 to be paid to the FTC and for a ban on making any unsubstantiated claims for any food, drug, dietary supplement, or program.

=== Schiff Nutrition International (2005–present) ===
In 2005, the company changed its name to Schiff Nutrition International. Its ticker symbol was changed to SHF in recognition of the new name in May 2012.

In October 2012, Bayer made an offer to acquire Schiff Nutrition for US$1.2 billion. Both sides initially agreed to terms, but the offer was trumped by a $1.4 million offer made by Reckitt Benckiser the following month. Bayer declined to make a counter offer, and Reckitt signed an acquisition deal on November 22.
