= Tiger's Milk (nutrition bar) =

Brand of energy bar

- Product type: Energy bar
- Current owner: McCormick & Company
- Country: United States
- Discontinued: December 2022
- Related brands: 1960s by Plus Products
- Previous owners: Plus Products; Weider Nutrition
- Tagline: "America's Original Nutrition Bar."

A Tiger's Milk bar.

Tiger's Milk was a nutrition bar created and introduced in the 1960s by Plus Products owned by James and Arthur Ingoldsby. It was later acquired by Weider Nutrition in the 1980s. The brand is currently owned by McCormick & Company.

Packaging dated from 1983 is part of the National Museum of American History's collection of objects, categorized within "Medicine and Science: Medicine" and described as a "nutritional product."

In 2007, Tiger's Milk was named by the editors of American Way magazine as one of six "Most Edible" energy bars (of 30 taste-tested).

In 2017, the Tiger's Milk brand was included in the transaction of McCormick & Company's purchase of RB Food that had previously been part of Reckitt Benckiser Group (Reckitt).

Around 2020, the digital media company Neopangea was hired to overhaul the Tiger's Milk brand. The redesign included new packaging, visuals, and voice.

A class-action lawsuit was filed against Schiff Nutrition International and Reckitt Benckiser in September 2019 for misleading advertising that labeled Tiger's Milk bars as "protein-rich". The lawsuit states that the protein content of the Tiger’s Milk bars falls below the 10-gram level recommended by nutritionists for building muscle, and fails to achieve its desired nutrition purposes due to the products’ elevated sugar content.

As of December 2022, all Tiger's Milk brand products have been discontinued. Tiger's Milk nutrition bars were discontinued due to a combination of a class action lawsuit, a failed rebranding attempt, and an increasing financial risk.
