= A. Schilling & Company =

American foodstuffs company

- Industry: Foodstuffs
- Founded: 1881; 145 years ago in San Francisco, California, U.S.
- Founder: August Schilling; George F. Volkmann
- Defunct: 1947
- Fate: Acquired by McCormick & Company
- Headquarters: San Francisco, United States
- Products: coffee, tea, baking powder, spices, and extracts

A. Schilling & Company was an American foodstuffs company founded in San Francisco, California, in 1881, by German emigres August Schilling and George F. Volkmann. They engaged in the processing of coffee, tea, baking powder, spices, extracts, and other unrelated products which they supplied to the grocery trade.

Schilling had processing plants at various locations in San Francisco. In 1903, the firm erected a new factory and office building at the corner of Second and Folsom Streets. The 1906 San Francisco earthquake destroyed the plant with only remnants of the brick walls left standing. Rebuilding at that location lasted about a year and during this period, goods processed in New York and elsewhere were shipped to San Francisco for distribution. The plant remained there until 1967 when the operation was relocated to 1311 Schilling Place, Salinas, California.

In 1947, the McCormick & Company, Inc. of Baltimore acquired the A. Schilling & Company. "Schilling", remaining in San Francisco, was operated as a division of McCormick's business. The acquisition of Schilling enabled McCormick to begin coast-to-coast distribution in the U.S. The company name then became "McCormick/Schilling" and was used until the 1990s when it was changed to "McCormick".

Between November 1991 and February 1992, McCormick/Schilling hosted a recipe contest in which contestants had to use "at least two spices, seasonings and/or extracts, excluding salt and pepper".
