= Airborne (dietary supplement) =

American brand of dietary supplement

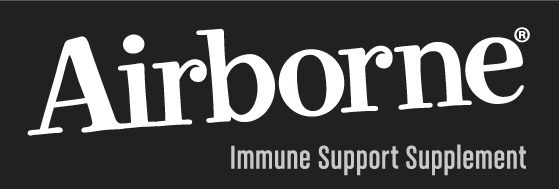
- Product type: Dietary supplements, Vitamin supplements
- Current owner: Reckitt
- Country: United States
- Previous owners: Schiff Nutrition
- Website: www.schiffvitamins.com

Airborne is an American brand of dietary supplement containing herbal extracts, amino acids, antioxidants, electrolytes, vitamins, and other ingredients originally marketed as preventing the common cold and improving immune function.

The benefits of its use are unsupported by robust clinical research. There are no studies supporting Airborne's effectiveness that meet scientific standards. The former owners were fined by the Federal Trade Commission for deceptive advertising and were the subject of successful class actions.

Schoolteacher Victoria Knight-McDowell created it in the early 1990s. The website does not list any side effects that one might experience after taking Airborne, aside from "some sensitivity to any of the vitamins or herbal extracts". It is offered for sale over-the-counter in many U.S. retail stores in multiple forms: effervescent tablet, gummy, chewable tablet, lozenge, tablet, or powder.

== History ==
The formula for Airborne was developed by Victoria Knight-McDowell, a former school teacher from Carmel, California. She began infusing herbal and vitamin cocktails in the early 1990s and selling them in tablet form to local drug stores. Later on, Knight-McDowell contracted cartoonist Lloyd Dangle to create Airborne's brand and packaging. In 1997, specialty grocery chain Trader Joe's ordered 300 cases of Airborne tablets to sell, and by 1999 other larger chains, such as Wal-Mart and Rite Aid, began stocking Airborne.

== Products ==
Airborne supplements are available in various flavors like "Zesty Orange", "Very Berry", "Lemon Lime", and "Pink Grapefruit", and in the following forms: effervescent tablets, powder packets, chewable tablets, lozenges, drink mixes, and gummies. The original product was a tablet that was put into water to create a fizzy, effervescent drink.

== Testing, research, and controversy ==
Because it is sold as a dietary supplement and not a drug, current American law allows Airborne to be marketed without prior review and approval of testing results demonstrating that it provides a medical remedy.

There are no studies supporting Airborne's effectiveness that meet scientific standards. A study by GNG Pharmaceutical Services referenced in the debate over Airborne's effectiveness was sponsored by the Knight-McDowell Labs, manufacturers of Airborne. In February 2006, ABC News discovered that GNG Pharmaceutical Services has no official clinic, scientists, or even doctors. Knight-McDowell Labs later removed all references to the study from their packaging and website.

A medical report on Airborne addressed some of these concerns, specifically regarding its large amounts of vitamin C:

There are some concerns. First, there is no conclusive evidence that this product or any of its ingredients prevents colds or shortens their duration. Second, the adult tablet contains 1 g of vitamin C, and the directions for use advise taking 1 tablet at the first sign of a cold and repeating the dose every 3 hours as necessary, but no more than three servings a day. Vitamin C in doses higher than 1 g increases oxalate and urate excretion and may cause kidney stones. Third, the safety of this herbal extraction combination has not been established. And with herbs and dietary supplements in general, we only have the manufacturers’ word on the label for what’s in them.

=== Class actions and settlements ===
The former makers of Airborne had been accused by the FTC of using false advertising in its marketing and making unproven claims that it could help ward off harmful bacteria and germs and help prevent the flu and the common cold.

A class action lawsuit was filed against the former owners of Airborne Health, Inc. (and other defendants) alleging that Airborne falsely advertised certain therapeutic properties, including the ability to cure or prevent the common cold, when marketing products under the Airborne brand name. Defendants denied any wrongdoing or illegal conduct but agreed to settle the litigation.

The Center for Science in the Public Interest (CSPI) participated in the class action lawsuit against Airborne.

On March 4, 2008, the former owners of Airborne Health Inc. agreed to pay $23.3 million to settle the lawsuit.

On August 14, 2008, a press release from the Federal Trade Commission (FTC) stated that the former owners of Airborne Health, Inc., had agreed to pay up to $30 million to settle FTC charges. According to the FTC's complaint:

there is no competent and reliable scientific evidence to support the claims made by the defendants that Airborne tablets can prevent or reduce the risk of colds, sickness, or infection; protect against or help fight germs; reduce the severity or duration of a cold; and protect against colds, sickness, or infection in crowded places such as airplanes, offices, or schools.

The FTC complaint also states that the company's former owners and founders, Victoria Knight-McDowell and Thomas John McDowell, "made false claims that Airborne products are clinically proven to treat colds."

Shortly after the settlements, a new management team was brought in to run the company. Marti Morfitt, former CEO and director of Breathe Right, led this management team. GF Capital Management and Advisors, LLC, a New York City-based private equity firm, purchased Airborne in October 2009. GF Capital said that the entire management team, including CEO Marti Morfitt, would remain intact. In March 2012, Schiff Nutrition acquired Airborne, Inc. In November 2012, Reckitt Benckiser bought Schiff Nutrition for $1.4 billion.

== Ingredients ==
According to the official website, Airborne contains zinc, ginger, Echinacea and up to 13 other vitamins, minerals and herbs. Each Airborne product has a different formulation and ingredient list.

The ingredients in most Airborne products include:

- Vitamin A as retinyl palmitate
- Vitamin C (ascorbic acid)
- Vitamin E (as delta-tocopheryl acetate)
- Riboflavin (vitamin B_{2})
- Magnesium (as oxide and sulfate)
- Zinc (as sulfate)
- Selenium (as amino acid chelate)
- Manganese (as gluconate)
- Sodium
- Potassium
- Yeast
- Herbal extract blend containing: Lonicera (flower), Forsythia (fruit), Schizonepeta (aboveground parts), ginger (dried rhizome), Chinese Vitex (fruit), Isatis (root) and Echinacea (aboveground parts)
- Amino acids: glutamine (as _{L}-glutamine) and lysine (as _{L}-lysine HCl)
- Other ingredients: maltodextrin, sorbitol, citric acid, sodium bicarbonate, potassium bicarbonate, orange flavor, mineral oil, acesulfame potassium, and sucralose

== Side effects ==
The official website does not list any side effects that one might experience after taking Airborne, aside from "some sensitivity to any of the vitamins or herbal extracts", but people who might be allergic to one of the ingredients of the product are advised to avoid using it or to consult a doctor. Also, people who are taking another type of medication at the same time or who suffer from different medical conditions should consult a physician before taking Airborne. Side effects from vitamin overdoses may occur, especially in patients with kidney failure. In very large doses, vitamin C in kidney failure patients can cause severe side effects such as oxalate deposits in bone and soft tissues and may interfere with the absorption and metabolism of vitamin B_{12}. The product contains 1 g of vitamin C per serving and a recommendation to take up to three servings daily. However, the National Academy of Medicine states in the Dietary Reference Intakes that vitamin C consumption should not exceed 2 g/day.

== See also ==
- Emergen-C
- Oscillococcinum
