= Michel Ducros =

French entrepreneur

Michel Ducros (born 1949) is a French entrepreneur who leads the French delicatessen company Fauchon and yacht services company Monaco Marine. He is the former chairman and CEO of Ducros, a family business specializing in spices and mixed herbs. Additionally, he continues to invest in several international companies.

== Early life ==
Born in 1949 in Kehl, southwest Germany, to a father who served as an officer in the French army and a mother was a teacher, Michel Ducros was raised in Buis-les-Baronnies, a village in the Drome region of the southeast of France. In this region his grandfather, harvested lime-tree leaves and lavender, which were used in herbalism. In 1963, his father Gilbert Ducros and his uncle Marc Ducros founded the eponymous family business that sold spices and mixed aromatic herbs.

== Career path ==
=== At Ducros Company (1971 to 1992) ===
After he graduated from college in Paris, Ducros joined the family business in 1971, where he was successively served as sales manager and marketing director between 1971 and 1985. He launched the company's first TV advertising campaign and established foreign branches in Italy, Spain, Belgium, Portugal, and Canada, leading the company to become the first spices brand in Europe. He became chairman of the company in 1986 until the sale of the Ducros company in 1992 to the Italian group Ferruzzi.

In 1976, he created the brand Vahiné, which within ten years became the leading brand of ingredients for homemade pastry. Additionally, in 1981, he established the brand La Tisanière, which became the first French brand for herbal tea.

=== At Monaco Marine (since 1995) ===
Passionate sailor and dissatisfied with artisanal maintenance services, Ducros founded the company Monaco Marine in 1995, through the acquisition of a small company "PowerBoat" servicing yachts in the port of Monaco, which offered a marina service for berths, winter storage, and maintenance. Monaco Marine developed a network of shipyards in Saint Laurent du Var, Beaulieu sur Mer, Antibes and Cogolin, all in the south of France. He entered in 2002 into a partnership with the public company of the port of La Ciotat to build the largest dry paint shed in Europe and a maintenance and refit network for mega-yachting industry, inaugurated in September 2007. In 2012, Monaco Marine acquired a long-standing family shipyard in the region, based in Antibes. Monaco Marine launched in 2016 a new shipyard in La Seyne, in the Toulon bay, that should open in September 2017.

Michel Ducros developed steadily Monaco Marine over the years : Monaco Marine had sales of 31 million Euros ($40 million) in 2003 and 50 million Euros ($60 million) in 2015, with nearly 200 employees.

=== At Fauchon (since 1998) ===
Ducros invested in Fauchon in 1998 along with other shareholders. Initially, he acquired a minority interest (10%) in the company. At the request of the shareholders, he gradually bought out most of the other shareholders until 2009, including the minority shareholdings, eventually holding almost all of the capital. He became chairman and CEO of Fauchon in January 2004.

When he took the CEO job in 2004, Fauchon was on the verge of bankruptcy. Michel Ducros immediately focused on rectifying the operating imbalance and repaying the debts. Loss-making assets were sold, and Fauchon cut back its workforce.

Michel Ducros set up a new Executive Committee to resolve the company's situation and implemented a repositioning and new branding strategy while expanding the international presence. By 2009–2010, the company achieved financial stability and cleared its debts. Subsequently, Fauchon increased its revenue, primarily from international markets. Fauchon reported an operating profit of €900,000 on sales of €50 million, with nearly a thousand employees.

Eleven years after the takeover of Fauchon, Michel Ducros continues to strengthen the group and pursue the international development of the brand, which has succeeded in establishing itself in the Middle East. As of May 2016, there are 25 stores and restaurants in this region.

In September 2015, Michel Ducros opted for a new strategy for Fauchon and set up a joint venture to develop and manage its first five-star hotel in downtown Paris, at Place de la Madeleine. The hotel was scheduled to open in January 2018 and aims to become the flagship for future Fauchon Hotels worldwide.

== Investment and shareholding ==
After the sale of the Ducros family spice business by his father and uncle, Michel Ducros began his own investments. He acquired a majority shareholding in the French lighting fixture retailer Laurie Lumière, which he developed between 1991 and 2008.

He founded his own investment Holding, Eucelia Investments SA, in 1992, which enable Michel Ducros to create Monaco Marine and take stakes in Fauchon.

== Public life ==
Ducros is a resident of Yens, Switzerland. He is married to a French tax lawyer and he has four children. He appointed his son Tanguy at the head of the Monaco Site of his Monaco Marine Company. Ducros also hired his son-in-law, Samy Vischel, to run the Fauchon's expansion in the Middle East, India, Russia and Africa.

In 2010, Ducros is suspected for influence peddling, as part of a housing project and a retirement home in the town of La Ciotat. Twenty people have already been indicted and the case is still open.
