= Charlie McCormack =

Scottish footballer

Personal information
- Full name: Charles McCormack
- Date of birth: 29 April 1895
- Place of birth: Garnkirk, Scotland
- Date of death: 1975 (aged 79–80)
- Place of death: Glasgow, Scotland
- Height: 5 ft 8 in (1.73 m)
- Position: Right back

Senior career*
Years	Team	Apps	(Gls)
–	Bellshill Athletic		
1915–1924	Third Lanark	234	(4)
1924–1928	Hamilton Academical	101	(7)
1928–1929	Ayr United	2	(0)
Total		337	(11)
- * Club domestic league appearances and goals

Charles McCormack (29 April 1895 – 1975) was a Scottish footballer who played as a right back, mainly for Third Lanark and Hamilton Academical, as well as a short spell at Ayr United before retiring.

He made more than 350 appearances in the Scottish Football League's top division and the Scottish Cup across 14 seasons but won no major trophies, the closest he got being a defeat to Rangers in the Glasgow Cup final in 1923. He was involved in a memorable match while playing for Hamilton against Rangers in 1927: required to take over as goalkeeper when Alex Binnie suffered a broken leg, his team were awarded a penalty which he scored, and the opposition then missed a penalty of their own. Rangers eventually equalised but McCormack made several saves and Accies held out for a draw.

McCormack toured North America in the summer of 1921 with 'Scotland' (in reality, Third Lanark with a number of capable guest players); no other representative honours came his way.
