= Louis Ducros House =

Historic house in Florida, United States

- Formerly listed on the U.S. National Register of Historic Places
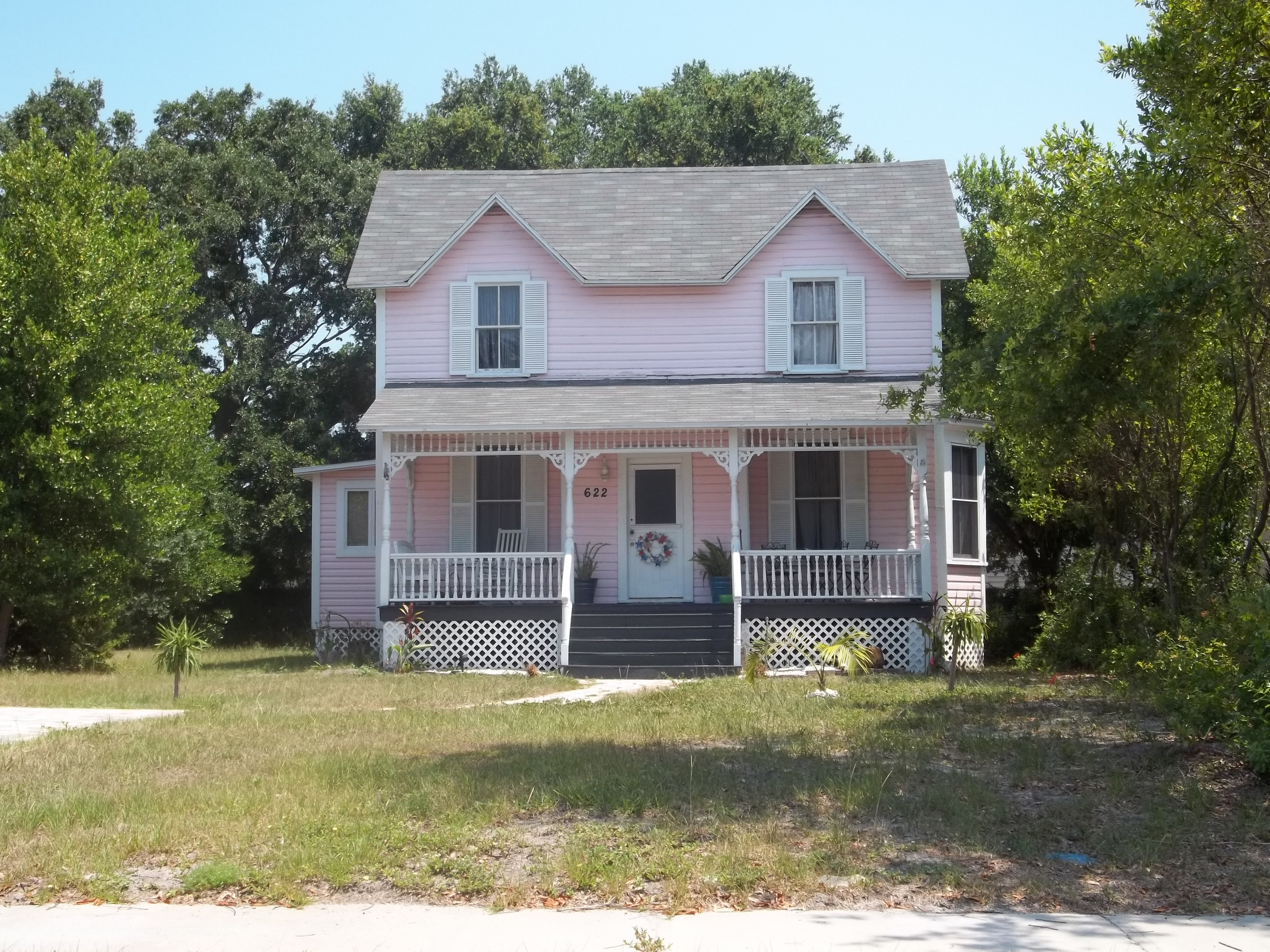

- Location within Florida Location within the United States
- Location: Clearwater, Florida
- Coordinates: 27°56′41″N 82°47′50″W
- NRHP reference No.: 79000688

Significant dates
- Added to NRHP: July 2, 1979
- Removed from NRHP: September 2, 2009

The Louis Ducros House (also known as the Plant-Ducros House) is a historic home in Clearwater, Florida. It is located at 1324 South Fort Harrison Street. On July 2, 1979, it was added to the U.S. National Register of Historic Places.

In 2004, it was purchased and shortly thereafter moved to 622 Belleview Boulevard.

It was removed from the National Register on September 2, 2009.
