= USS Wilbert A. Edwards =

Patrol vessel of the United States Navy

History

United States
- Name: USS Wilbert A. Edwards
- Namesake: Previous name retained
- Builder: M. M. Davis, Solomons Island, Maryland
- Completed: 1911
- Acquired: 1917
- Commissioned: 10 August 1917
- Decommissioned: 21 August 1919
- Stricken: 24 September 1919
- Fate: Sold 24 September 1919
- Notes: Operated as commercial fishing vessel Wilbert A. Edwards 1911 to 1917 and from 1919 to the late 1940s

General characteristics
- Type: Patrol vessel
- Displacement: 650 tons
- Length: 160 ft (49 m)
- Beam: 23 ft 10 in (7.26 m)
- Draft: 10 ft 0 in (3.05 m) mean
- Propulsion: Steam engine
- Speed: 11 knots
- Complement: 36
- Armament: 2 × 3-inch (76.2-millimeter) guns; 2 × 1-pounder guns

USS Wilbert A. Edwards (SP-315), sometimes called USS W. A. Edwards, was a United States Navy patrol vessel in commission from 1917 to 1919.

== Construction, acquisition, and commissioning ==
Wilbert A. Edwards was built as a wooden-hulled commercial steam fishing vessel of the same name in 1911 by M. M. Davis at Solomons Island, Maryland, for the W. A. Edwards Corporation. The U.S. Navy purchased her from the W. A. Edwards Corporation in 1917 for World War I service as a patrol vessel. She was commissioned as USS Wilbert A. Edwards (SP-315) on 10 August 1917 at the Norfolk Navy Yard in Portsmouth, Virginia, with Lieutenant D. C. Kindell, USNRF, .

== Career ==
=== Attempted use on "distant service" ===
Lieutenant Robert Phillips, NNV, relieved Lieutenant Kindell as commanding officer on 17 September 1917 while Wilbert A. Edwards was at Gravesend Bay, New York. Assigned to "distant service"—meaning service outside the United States—she departed Gravesend Bay on 19 September 1917, transited the Cape Cod Canal on the morning of 20 September 1917, and arrived at the Boston Navy Yard in Boston, Massachusetts, later that day.

After voyage repairs, she left for Halifax, Nova Scotia, Canada, on 25 September 1917 on what was probably supposed to be the first leg of a voyage to Ponta Delgada in the Azores to take up patrol duties from that port. However, on 26 September 1917 she suffered an engine casualty and notified the nearby United States Coast Guard Cutter USCGC Algonquin of her plight. Algonquin took the disabled Wilbert A. Edwards in tow that afternoon and took her to Halifax, where they arrived on 27 September 1917. There, Wilbert A. Edwards coaled before getting underway in tow of Algonquin on 1 October 1917.

The ships ran into a heavy storm on the afternoon of the first day out of port. Weather conditions had worsened rapidly, and Wilbert A. Edwards rolled and labored heavily, shipping much water. By 0500 hours on 2 October 1917, the chief engineer on board reported to Lieutenant Phillips that the ship was taking water and that he was unable to keep the flooding under control. At 0800 hours, the executive officer, Lieutenant, junior grade, Henry J. Porter, USNRF, and the ship's carpenter examined the steering gear and found the quadrant working loose on the rudder, the stuffing box slack in its bed, and all bolts loose in the woodwork. They tried to repair the damage but could not. Meanwhile, the flooding continued below decks as the ship rolled and pitched at an alarming rate. By noon, though, the water in the engine room had not gained on the pumps. At last the ship seemed to be holding her own. Algonquin kept Wilbert A. Edwards in tow as she steamed ahead at slow speed, and the two ships eventually returned to Halifax on 4 October 1917.

=== Reassignment to the 1st Naval District ===
After ultimately returning to Boston in company with the collier USS Mars (Collier No. 6), Wilbert A. Edwards underwent repairs there. However, the Navy concluded that she would not be fit for "distant service" and, on 2 February 1918, reassigned her to section patrol duties in the 1st Naval District in northern New England.

Wilbert A. Edwards remained in 1st Naval District service through the end of World War I and into 1919, spending most of her time under repair.

== Decommissioning and disposal ==
Wilbert A. Edwards was decommissioned at Boston on 21 August 1919. She was stricken from the Navy List on 24 September 1919 and simultaneously sold back to the W. A. Edwards Corporation. She resumed commercial operations, which she continued into the late 1940s.
