= Schwartz (brand) =

Brand of herbs and spices

The Schwartz company was founded in 1841 to sell coffee in Halifax, Nova Scotia, Canada. In 1984 McCormick & Company took over the brand, thereby becoming the world's largest producer of herbs, spices, and seasonings.

Started by William Henry Schwartz, a descendant of Otho Wilhelm Schwartz, a fur trader and founding settler of Halifax in 1749, the company grew as a family operation in Halifax. Son W. E. Schwartz added pure spices with the purchase of a spice mill in 1880. By the 1930s the company was selling in more than fifty countries. Its slogan was "Say Schwartz and be Sure" and by the 1950s their current "S" trademark was in use. Subsequent changes in ownership have resulted in the business now being represented solely by the brand.
