= Ellon, Calvados =

Ellon
- Commune
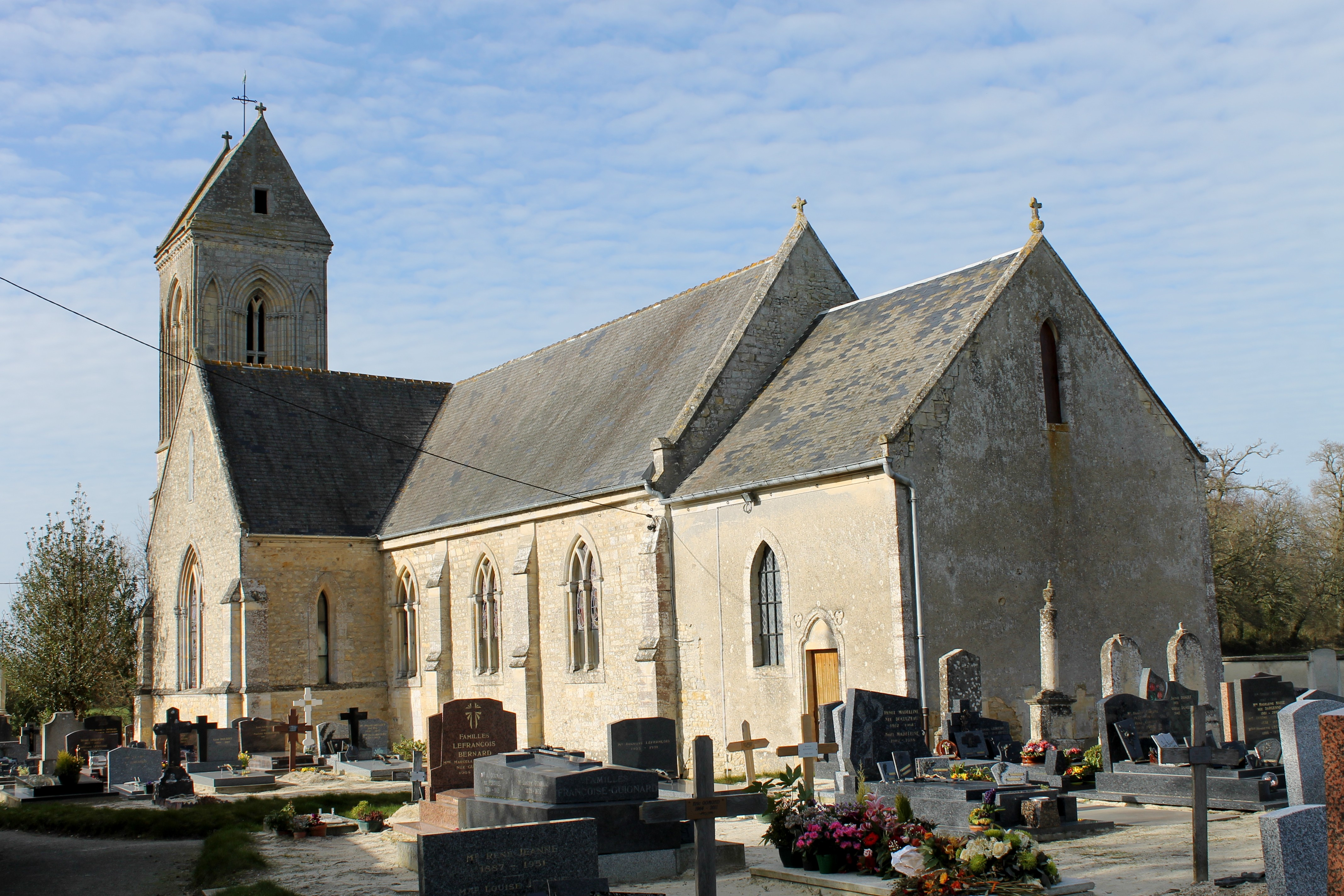
- The church in Ellon
- Location of Ellon
- Location within France Location within Normandy
- Coordinates: 49°13′17″N 0°40′41″W
- Country: France
- Region: Normandy
- Department: Calvados
- Arrondissement: Bayeux
- Canton: Bayeux
- Intercommunality: CC Bayeux Intercom

Government
  - Mayor (2020–2026): Claude Lemière
- Area^{1}: 6.73 km^{2} (2.60 sq mi)
- Elevation: 70 m (230 ft)
- Highest elevation: 91 m (299 ft)
- Lowest elevation: 45 m (148 ft)
- Population (2023): 636
  - Density: 94.5/km^{2} (245/sq mi)
- Time zone: UTC+01:00 (CET)
  - Summer (DST): UTC+02:00 (CEST)
- INSEE/Postal code: 14236 /14250
- ^{1} French Land Register data, which excludes lakes, ponds, glaciers > 1 km^{2} (0.386 sq mi or 247 acres) and river estuaries.

Ellon (French pronunciation: [ɛlɔ̃]) is a commune in the Calvados department and Normandy region of north-western France.

== Population ==
Historical population
Year	Pop.	±% p.a.
1968	324	—
1975	291	−1.52%
1982	364	+3.25%
1990	380	+0.54%
1999	374	−0.18%
2007	368	−0.20%
2012	482	+5.55%
2017	504	+0.90%
2023	636	+3.95%
Source: INSEE

== See also ==
- Communes of the Calvados department
