= Robert G. Hess =

American mechanical engineer and business executive

Robert Graves Hess (Oct. 11. 1908 - Dec. 5, 1995) was an American mechanical engineer and business executive, known as president and general manager at Wright Machinery Company Division of Sperry Rand Corp.

== Biography ==
=== Youth and early career ===
Hess was born in Forty Fort, Pennsylvania, in 1908 to Charles Frederick Hess and Mary Adelle (Graves) Hess. He obtained his BSc in mechanical engineer at Lehigh University in 1931.

After his graduation Pratt started his career in industry at the York Corporation in York, Pennsylvania, now York International, as student engineer. In 1932 he was chief engineer at Neuman Ice Co, and from 1933 to 1941 general foreman at Westinghouse Electric Corporation in Newark. After a year as general superintendent at Hydraulic Controls Inc. in Chicago, he joined the New York Air Brake.

=== Later career ===
At New York Air Brake Hess climbed up the ladder from chief industrial engineer in 1943-45, and director of wages, methods and budget in 1945-49, to general manager in 1953-54. In 1952 he was also appointed president director of the Kinney Manufacturing Company in Boston. In 1955 he was vice president of operations at the Pesco Products division of the Borg-Warner Corp. in Bedford, Ohio. In 1956-58 he was executive vice-president at the Walworth Corporation in New York City.

In 1959 Hess joined the Sperry Corporation, where he was president and general manager at the Wright Machinery Corporation in 1959-61. He was managing director at Sperry Gyroscope Co. Ltd.. in 1961-63, and in 1963 became general manager of the Latin American operations of the Remington Office Equipment division. He also served as director of Sperry Europe Continental, Paris.
