= Berentzen =

German beverage company

Berentzen-Gruppe Aktiengesellschaft
- Company type: Public
- ISIN: DE0005201602
- Industry: Drink industry
- Founded: 1758
- Founder: Johann Bernhard Tobias Berentzen
- Headquarters: Haselünne, Germany
- Key people: Oliver Schwegmann (Vorstand) Ralf Brühöfner (Vorstand)
- Website: www.berentzen-gruppe.de

Berentzen-Gruppe Aktiengesellschaft is a publicly traded German beverage manufacturer headquartered in Haselünne in the Emsland region. Its core business activities focus on the production and distribution of spirits, non-alcoholic beverages, and fresh juice systems. The group employs approximately 500 people at locations in Germany, Austria, and Turkey.

== History ==
=== The Berentzen Grain Distillery, 1758–1988 ===
Today's Berentzen Group traces its origins to several family-owned businesses. The oldest, the I. B. Berentzen grain distillery ("J. B. Berentzen"), was founded in 1758 by councilman Johann Bernhard Tobias Berentzen (born April 2, 1718; died December 18, 1798) in Haselünne. At that time, there were already 25 other "moonshine distillers" in Haselünne, as evidenced by the records of a court visitation from 1758.

The family name was trademarked in 1899 with the registration of the Berentzen grain brandy "vom alten Faß" as a trademark. In 1958, the company entered the non-alcoholic beverage market with the founding of Emsland-Getränke GmbH. In 1960, the company acquired the Concession for Pepsi-Cola in Germany.

A major milestone in the company's history was the introduction of Apfelkorn (a mixed drink made from wheat schnapps and apple juice) in 1976 by brothers Friedrich and Hans Berentzen. Berentzen Apfelkorn is considered the most successful new spirits launch in Germany since World War II and has been exported abroad since 1979.

=== Founding of the Berentzen Group and Initial Public Offering ===
In 1988, the Berentzen Group was formed through a merger with the Pabst & Richarz distillery and became Germany's second-largest spirits company. The roots of Pabst and Richarz date back to the 19th century: In 1861, Wilhelm Josef Richarz began distilling wine in Königswinter; in 1898, Hermann Pabst founded a wine shop in Düsseldorf, which was later followed by a distillery. The two family-owned companies merged in 1969.

In 1994, the Berentzen Group became the first German spirits manufacturer to go public. Subsequently, Berentzen acquired numerous companies in the spirits industry, including Strothmann (1996) and Dethleffsen (1999). While the voting common shares remained in the hands of the owner families, numerous investors purchased the non-voting preferred shares on the stock market. These were also popular as "tickets" to the annual general meetings, which were celebrated in Haselünne "like a folk festival" until 2005 and at which the group's products were generously served as a dividend in kind.

However, after initial gains, the stock lost over 90% of its value between its all-time high in 1996 (over 35 euros, or just under 70 DM) and 2003 (3 euros). Despite several restructurings, changes in top management, and a takeover, the stock price had not recovered.

Problems were particularly evident in the core spirits business. Over the course of ten years, domestic sales in this sector declined from over 200 million euros in 1996 (just under 400 million German marks at the time) to only 104 million euros in 2006, despite interim acquisitions and the purchase of licensed brands. Group revenue (excluding Alcohol tax) amounted to just €180 million in 2006. Non-alcoholic beverages accounted for a good quarter of that figure.

=== Withdrawal of the owner families ===
In 2006, Jan Berentzen stepped down from the Executive Board. For the first time, day-to-day operations were now in the hands of management outside the family. In 2007, Berentzen announced a consolidation strategy. An extensive marketing campaign was intended to strengthen the company's position in Germany's overall declining spirits market. The first year of implementation, 2007, ended with a loss of 11.8 million euros.

In the summer of 2008, the year of the company's 250th anniversary, the previous owner families—Berentzen, Pabst, Richarz, and Wolff—largely withdrew from the company and sold approximately 75% of the common stock to a subsidiary of the Munich-based private equity firm Aurelius. The remaining 24.9% of the common stock remained with approximately 20 shareholders, including the family branches led by Jan Bernd Berentzen, Christian Berentzen, and Friedrich Berentzen. The Pabst and Richarz families, on the other hand, sold all of their shares. As a result of a takeover bid under the Securities Acquisition and Takeover Act, additional common shares and a portion of the preferred shares were transferred to Aurelius by the end of 2008. Against this backdrop, the company's 250th anniversary in 2008 was not celebrated.

=== Developments during the period of ownership by Aurelius AG ===
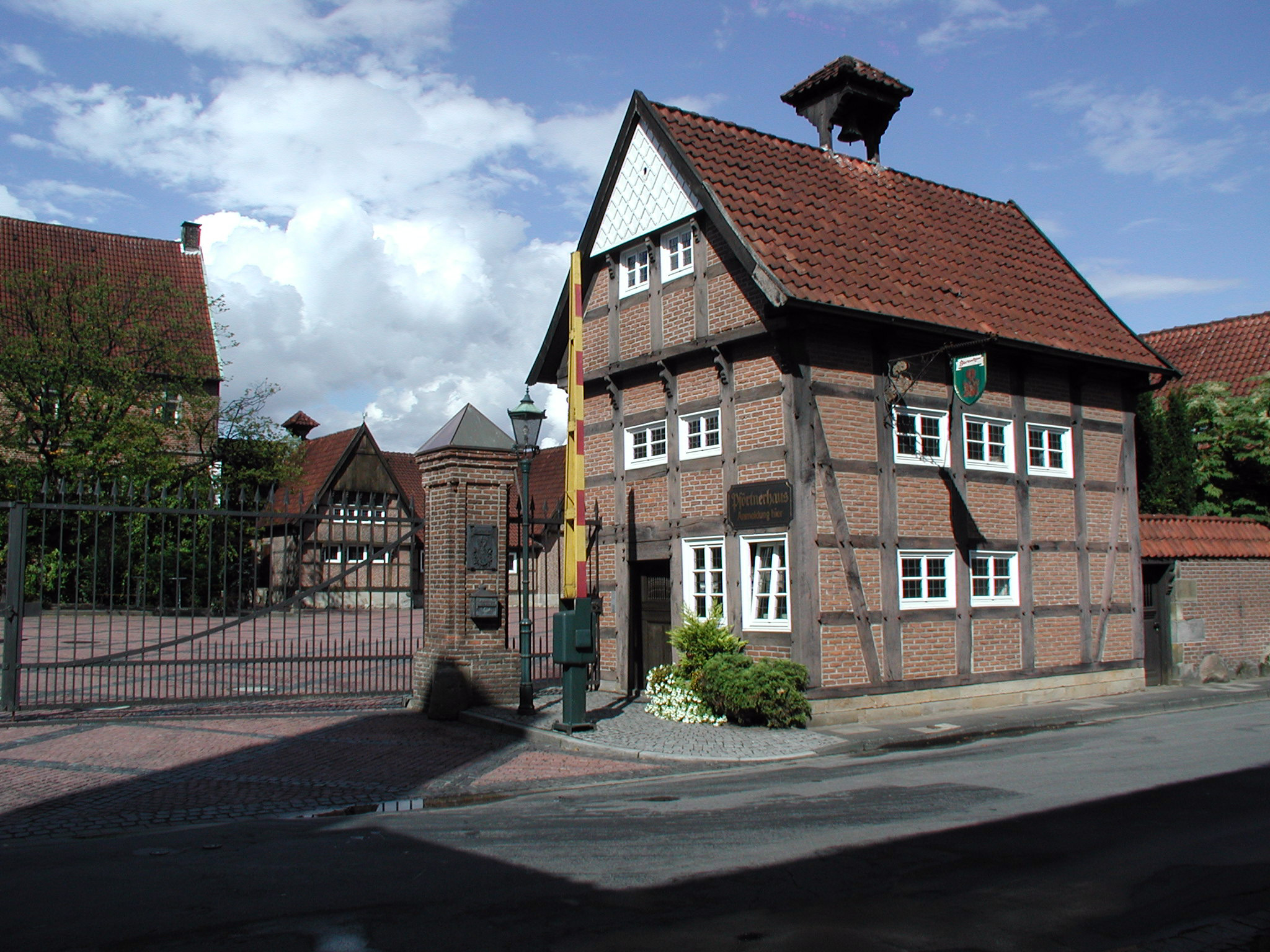
The Former Berentzen Grain Distillery in Haselünne

In the 2008 fiscal year, the company incurred a loss of 22.5 million euros. The management team appointed by the new owner decided on restructuring measures, including streamlining the administrative department, spinning off sales, marketing, and logistics, and closing the distillery at its historic location in Haselünne's old town. Spirits production was relocated from there to the existing site in Minden. The administrative offices and a bottling plant for soft drinks and mineral water remain in Haselünne.

As of April 1, 2009, two well-known imported brands, Licor 43 from Spain and Linie-Aquavit from Norway, are no longer distributed by Berentzen; the manufacturers had terminated their contracts following the sale to Aurelius. For the 2009 fiscal year, despite a continued decline in sales, the company reported a net profit for the first time in several years.

In June 2013, the soft drink company PepsiCo announced that it would not renew the franchise agreement, which was set to expire at the end of 2015. During its more than 50-year partnership with the Berentzen Group, the subsidiary Vivaris had grown to become the largest of the four remaining Pepsi franchisees. In January 2014, according to an ad hoc announcement, the Berentzen Group reached an agreement within a single day first with the PepsiCo Group to terminate the contract early at the end of 2014, and subsequently with Deutsche Sinalco GmbH Markengetränke & Co. KG on a new franchise agreement to take effect immediately thereafter. Since 2015, Sinalco has been distributed under license.

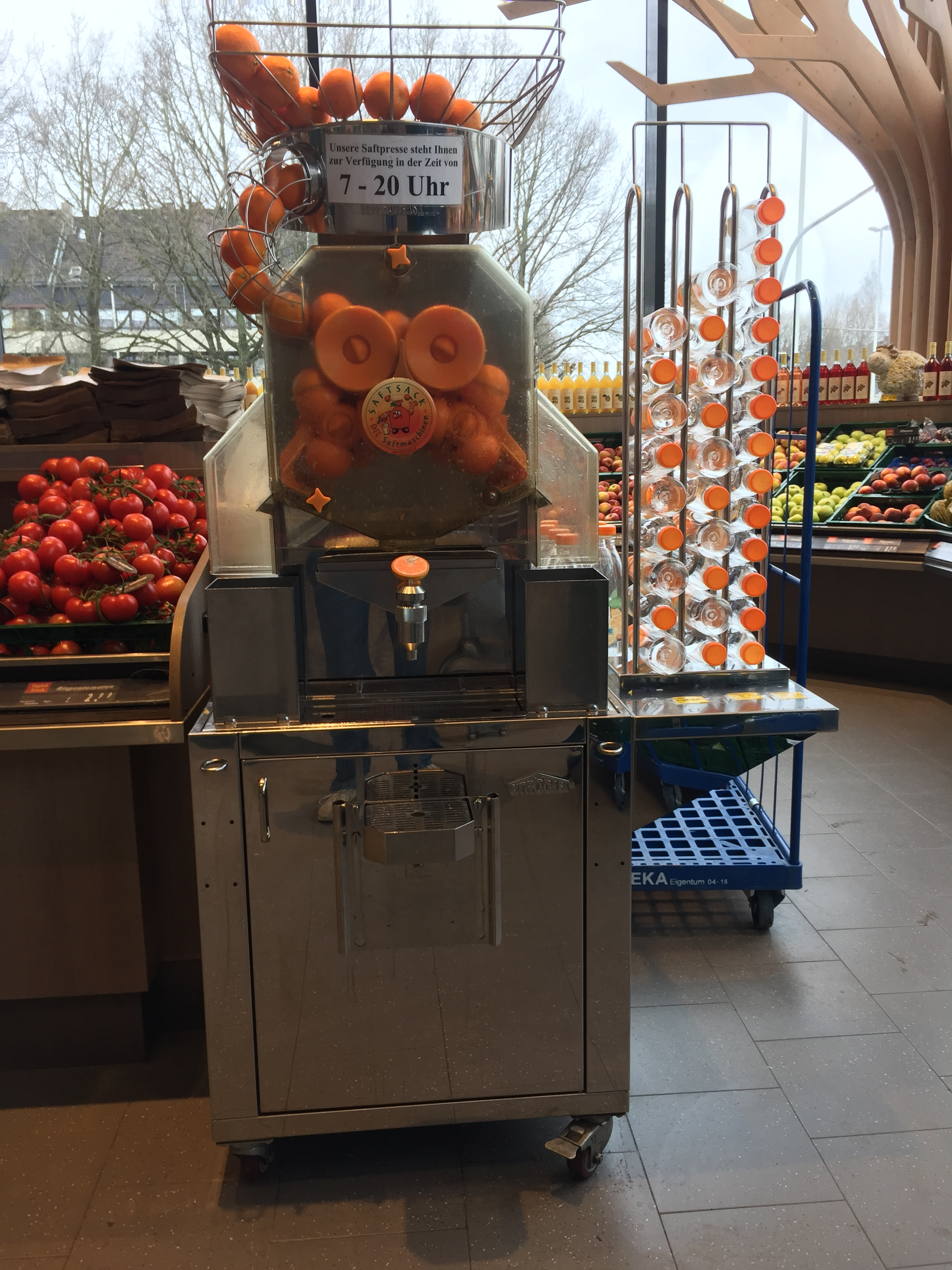
Citrocas Juicer

In early September 2014, the Berentzen Group announced that it had agreed to acquire all shares in the then-named TMP Technic-Marketing-Products GmbH (now Citrocasa GmbH), based in Linz, Austria, for a purchase price of between €15.50 million and €17.45 million. The company is an internationally active system provider of freshly squeezed orange juice (brand: Citrocasa).

During 2016, Aurelius sold its entire stake in the company. The largest shareholder is currently the Luxembourg-based Mainfirst SICAV. The majority of the shares are held by the public. Back in 2015, the Berentzen Group had already converted all non-voting preferred shares into voting common shares. As a result, common shares became the only class of stock in the Berentzen Group.

=== Development since 2016 ===
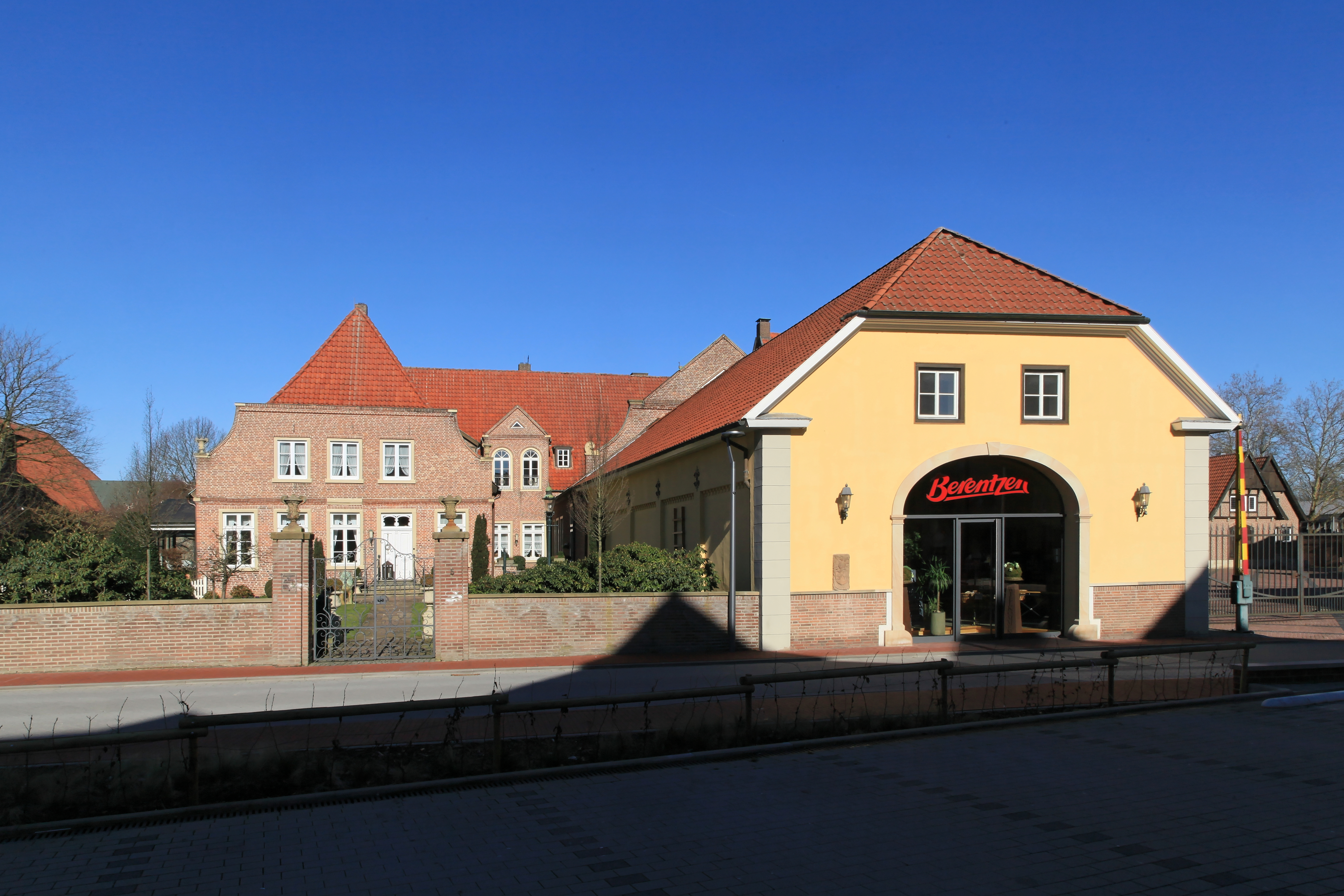
Berentzen Hof

In 2017, the company opened a distillery at the Berentzen Hof in Haselünne, primarily intended to produce spirits in the premium segment. To drive new growth, Berentzen began focusing on premium products. In February 2019, it launched Tres Países, a premium rum, and in April 2019, Berentzen Signature, a line of premium fruit liqueurs. Building on the success of Mio Mio, Berentzen decided in May 2019 to launch the herbal soda Kräuterbraut.
