= Hase =

River in Lower Saxony, Germany

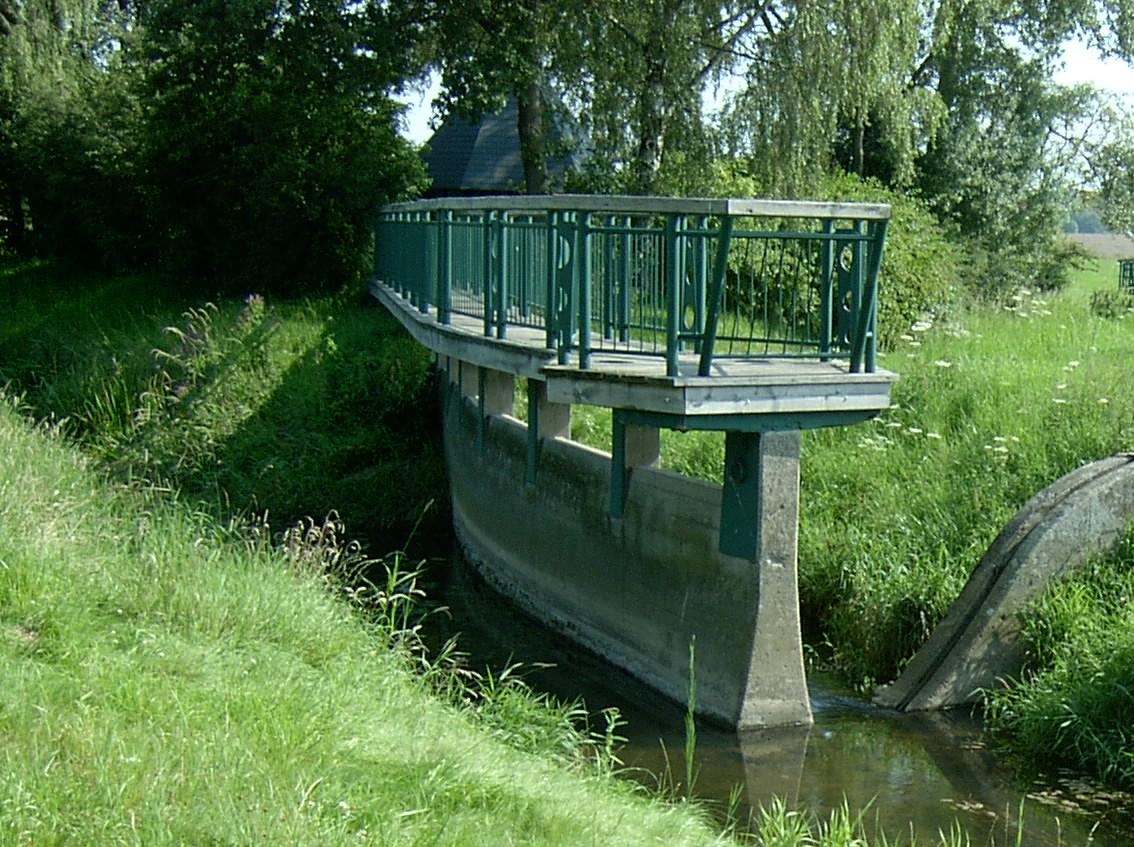
- Hase - Else River bifurcation

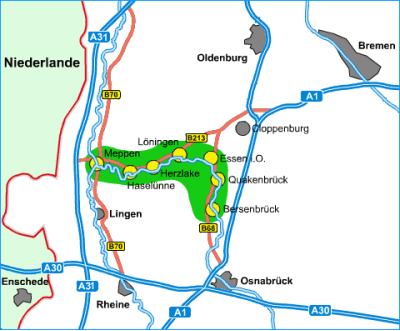
- Course of the Hase through the Hase Valley
- Etymology: haswa, germanic for gray

Location
- Country: Germany
- State: Lower Saxony
- Cities: Meppen (mouth); Haselünne; Herzlake; Löningen; Essen; Quakenbrück; Bersenbrück; Bramsche; Osnabrück; Wellingholzhausen (source)

Physical characteristics
- Source
  - location: Melle-Wellingholzhausen, Teutoburg Forest
  - coordinates: 52°7′57″N 8°15′53″E
  - elevation: 165 m (541 ft)
- Mouth: Ems River
  - location: Meppen
  - coordinates: 52°41′28″N 7°17′48″E
  - elevation: 15 m (49 ft)
- Length: 169.7 km (105.4 mi)
- Basin size: 3,116 km^{2} (1,203 sq mi)

Basin features
- Progression: Ems→ North Sea
- Tributaries
  - right: Südradde, Mittelradde

The Hase (German pronunciation: [ˈhaːzə]) is a 169.7-kilometre-long (105.4 mi) river of Lower Saxony, Germany. It is a right tributary of the Ems, but part of its flow goes to the Else, that is part of the Weser basin. Its source is in the Teutoburg Forest, south-east of Osnabrück, on the north slope of the 307-metre-high (1,007 ft) Hankenüll hill.

== Weser-Ems watershed ==
After about 15 kilometres (9 mi), near Gesmold and about 6 kilometres (4 mi) west of Melle, the Hase encounters an anomaly of terrain and bifurcates such that each branch flows into a different drainage system:

- One third of its water flows along the south side of the Wiehengebirge hills eastward from Gesmold into the Else, which begins there, and flows into the Werre at Kirchlengern (north of Herford). The Werre is a tributary of the Weser.
- Two thirds of its water (the Hase proper) flows northwest from Gesmold toward Osnabrück, past the towns listed below, and toward Meppen, where the Ems receives its flow.

== Towns ==
- Melle
- Bissendorf
- Osnabrück
- Wallenhorst
- Bramsche – to the south of this city, the Hase crosses the Mittelland Canal
- Rieste
- Alfhausen – here the Hase forms the Alfsee, an artificial lake acting as flood-retention basin for the lower reaches
- Bersenbrück
- Badbergen
- Quakenbrück – in the southeast, the Hase divides into two branches: the Big Hase (passing the town in the northeast) and the Little Hase (which itself is divided into several branches within the town, one of which leaves the town northwards to the Big Hase) (Binnendelta)
- Menslage – here the Hase is channeled into the Little Hase
- Löningen – here it flows into a somewhat northerly branch: the Big Hase
- Herzlake – here the two branches flow together again
- Haselünne
- Meppen

== Hydroelectricity ==
Currently one run-of-the-river hydroelectricity is installed:

Location	Operator	Power	active
Bersenbrück, Wasserkraftwerk Hasemühle	private	190 kW	yes

== Pictures ==
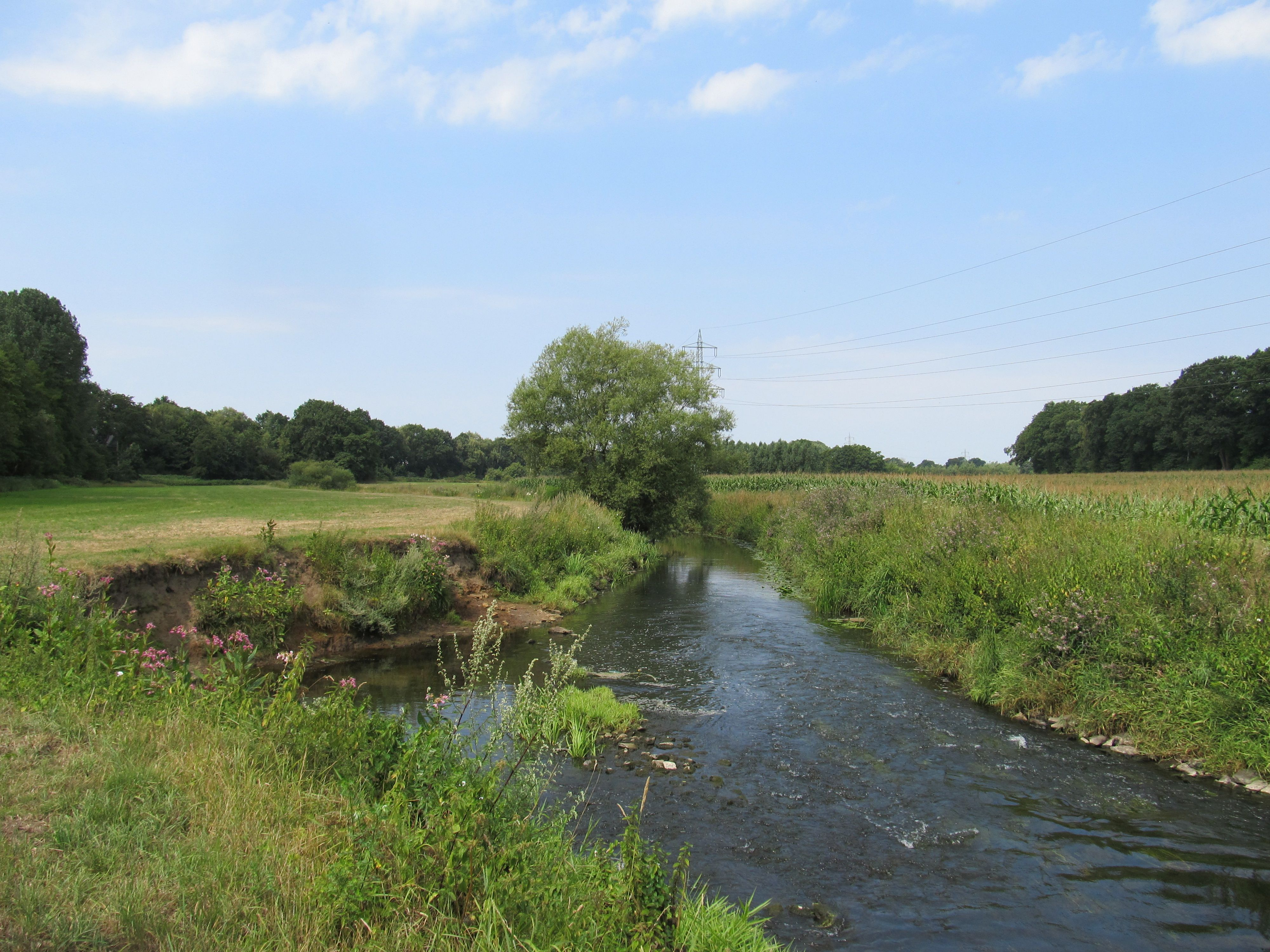
The Hase at Wallenhorst

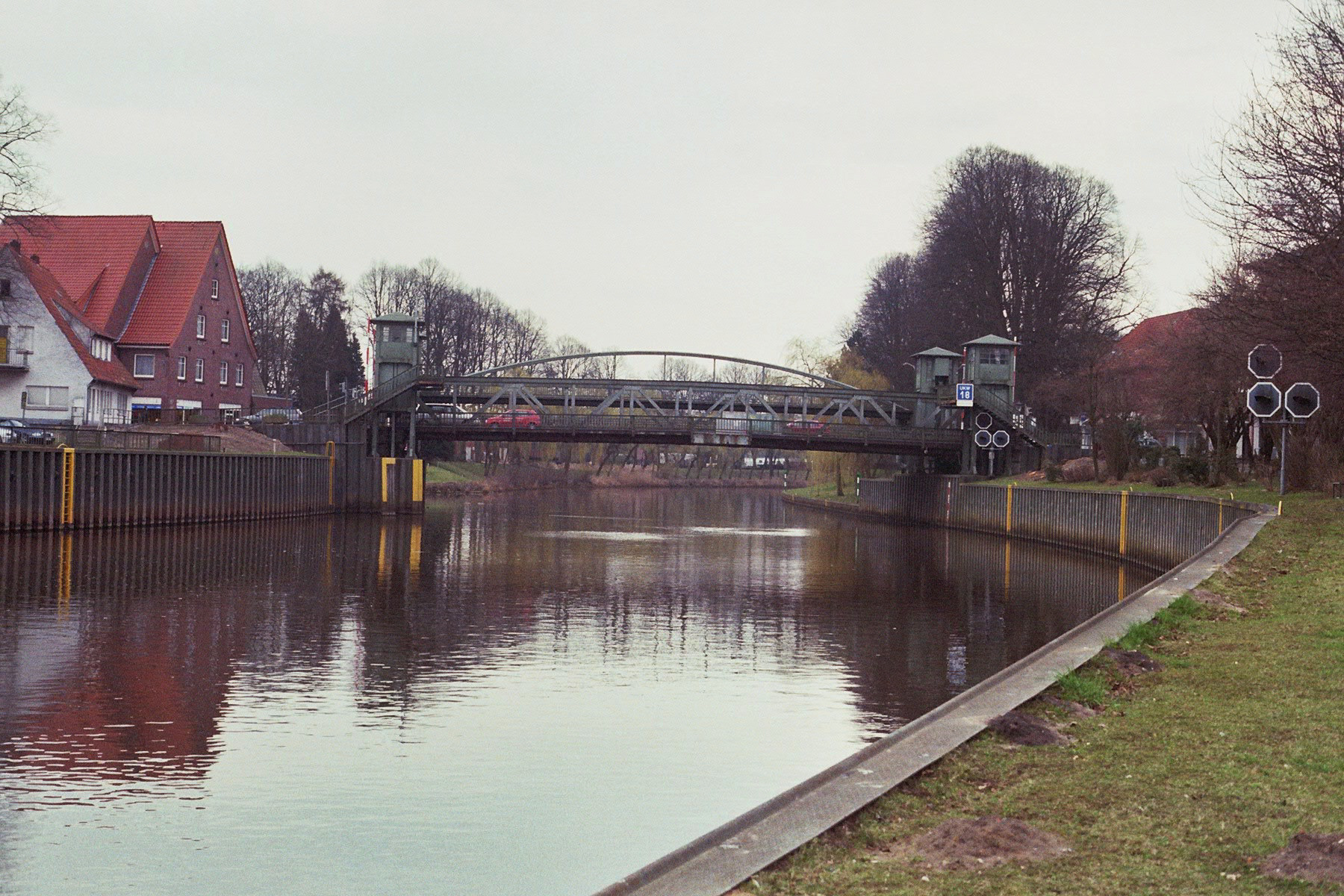
River mouth in Meppen, seen from river Ems

== See also ==
- List of rivers of Lower Saxony
