= Friedrich Berentzen =

German businessman (1928–2009)

- Born: 1928; Germany
- Died: February 20, 2009 (aged 80–81); Bad Rothenfelde, Lower Saxony, Germany
- Occupation: Businessman
- Known for: Leadership of the Berentzen Group; development of Berentzen Apfelkorn
- Political party: Christian Democratic Union of Germany (CDU)
- Spouse(s): Dorothea “Doris” Berentzen (née Heydt; 1940–2021)
- Children: 3
- Awards: Order of Merit of the Federal Republic of Germany (1st Class); Lower Saxony Order of Merit; “Silberne Halbkugel”, German National Committee for Monument Protection (1987)

Friedrich Josef Maria Berentzen (11 September 1928 in Haselünne – 20 February 2009 in Bad Rothenfelde) was a German businessman known for the liquor manufacturer Berentzen, who was until 2005 family business. He is the inventor of apple flavor grain liquors and brought the Apfelkorn in 1976 as an independent product on the market.

== Life ==
Friedrich Berentzen was born in 1928 as the second-oldest of nine children of Johannes Bernhard Berentzen (1899–1954) and his wife Anna (née Kerckhoff, 1903–1968). He was a grandson of Johannes Berentzen and a nephew of Hermann Kerckhoff. Shortly after the end of the Second World War, he began studying chemistry at the Technical University of Darmstadt.

In 1954, following the death of his father, he assumed management of the family business together with his brother Hans Berentzen. In 1958, the brothers established Emsland-Getränke as a second business pillar in the non-alcoholic beverages sector, a development that was further expanded in 1960 with the acquisition of the Pepsi-Cola concession for Germany. Together, the brothers developed the Berentzen Apfelkorn, which in 1976 was described as the most successful new German spirits launch since the Second World War. In 1988, the company merged with Pabst & Richarz under the leadership of the brothers. He served as technical managing director of the Berentzen Group until the early 1990s.

Friedrich Berentzen continued to be involved in the company’s strategic direction following the merger of the two family businesses. In 1994, Hans and Friedrich Berentzen took the family company public, making it the only firm in the German spirits industry at the time to do so. When a majority stake in the company was sold to the financial investor Aurelius AG in 2008, he retained his shares as a minority shareholder in the 250-year-old family enterprise.

Since 1961, he was married to Dorothea (known as Doris; née Heydt, 1940–2021). The couple had three children.

Friedrich Berentzen died on the morning of 20 February 2009 in Bad Rothenfelde, shortly after undergoing heart surgery. In addition to his political work, he supported town-twinning initiatives with Elburg in the Netherlands and Saint-Flour in France.

== Public service and affiliations ==
Friedrich Berentzen was a member of the Christian Democratic Union of Germany (CDU). From 1971 to 1991, he served on the city council of Haselünne, including as CDU parliamentary group leader from 1976 to 1981. He was mayor of Haselünne from 1981 to 1991.

Together with his brother Hans, he was also involved in shaping the urban development of his hometown. He advocated for Haselünne’s inclusion in the Lower Saxony urban renewal programme and, as long-time chairman of the local heritage association (from 1956), promoted the construction of a local history museum, inaugurated in 1961, and the expansion of an open-air museum. Historic townhouses and farm buildings were preserved and relocated, and several dilapidated Burgmannshöfe were restored for use as hotels or restaurants. He received the “Silberne Halbkugel” (Silver Hemisphere) award from the German National Committee for Monument Protection in 1987. In 2006, he and his wife Doris were awarded the Landscape Medal of the Emsländische Landschaft. He was also a recipient of the Order of Merit of the Federal Republic of Germany (First Class) and the Lower Saxony Order of Merit. A street in Haselünne, Friedrich-Berentzen-Weg, was later named in his honour.

Berentzen held numerous honorary positions and was named both an honorary citizen and honorary mayor of Haselünne. He was a member for more than 55 years of the Reichsbund der Kriegsbeschädigten, later known as the Sozialverband Deutschland.

During his studies in 1949, he joined the Catholic student fraternity KDStV Nassovia Darmstadt in the Cartellverband (CV) and later also became a member of KDStV Rheno-Bavaria Köln, KDStV Asgard (Düsseldorf) zu Köln, KAV Suevia Berlin, and AV Cheruscia zu Münster, all affiliated with the CV.
