= Alfsee =

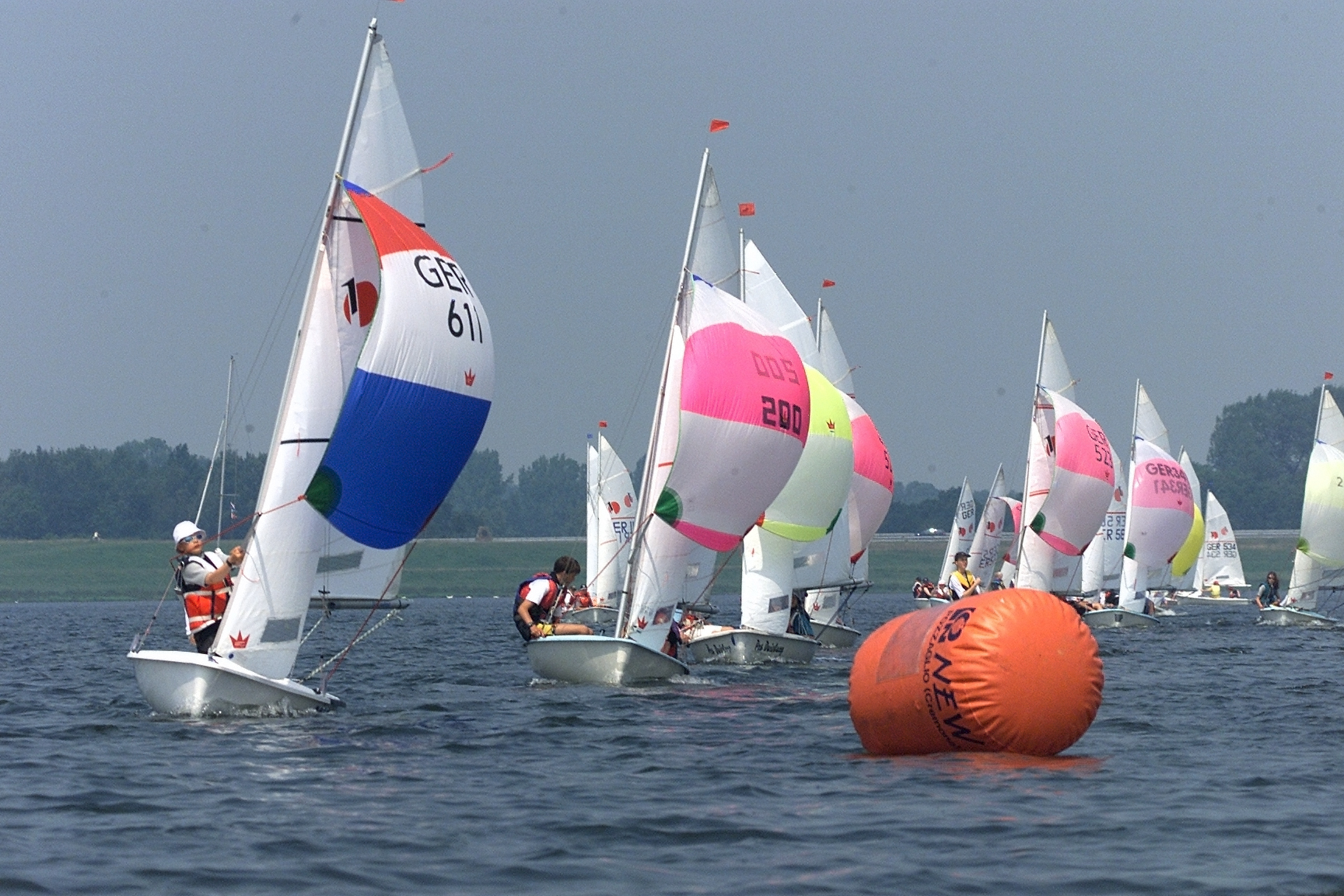
- Interactive map of Alfsee
- Country: Germany
- Location: Osnabrück
- Coordinates: 52°29′16″N 07°58′29″E
- Opening date: 1971

Dam and spillways
- Length: 320 m (1,050 ft)
- Width (base): 17 m (56 ft)

Reservoir
- Total capacity: 20 million m^{3}
- Surface area: 2.2 km^{2}

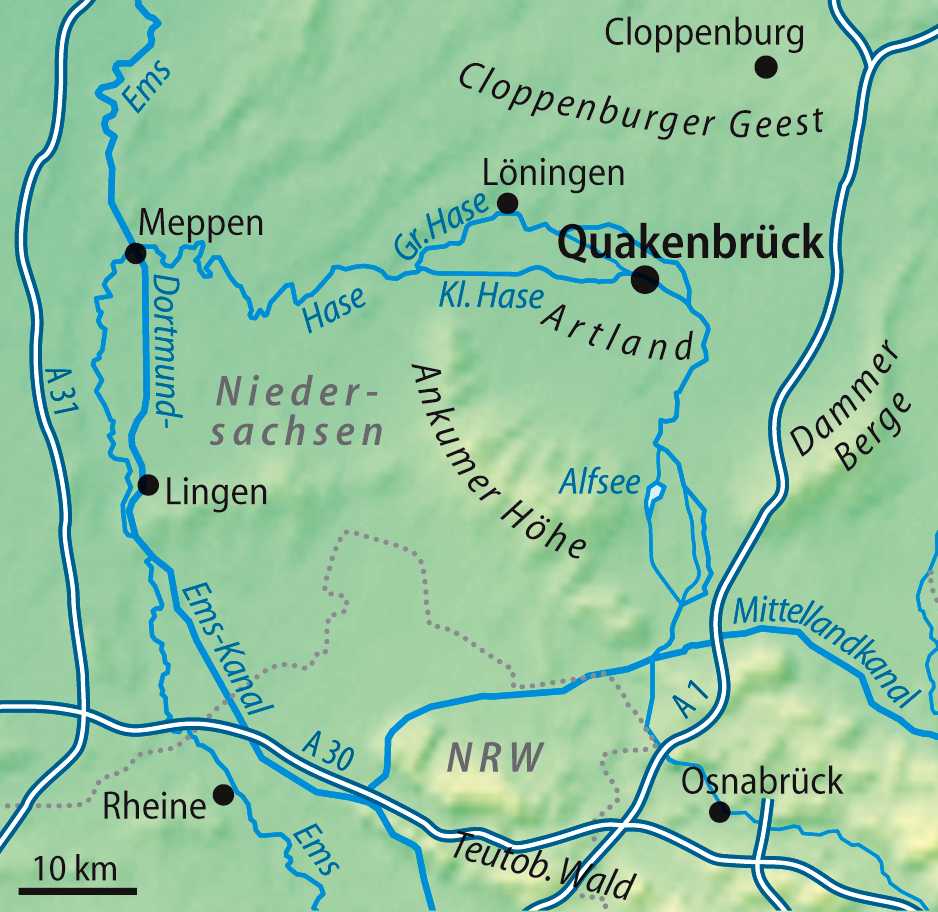
Location

The Alfsee is a reservoir in the north of the district of Osnabrück in the state of Lower Saxony in north Germany. It has an area of 2.2 km^{2}.

It acts as a flood retention basin for the catchment area of the Hase and as local recreational area.

== Geography ==
The Alfsee is located in the north of Bramgau in Osnabrücker Land. It lies around 25 km north of the city of Osnabrück and 8 km north of Bramsche, southeast of the Ankum Heights. About 95% of its area belongs to the parish of Alfhausen to the west, after which the reservoir is named. The rest, a bay on the eastern side of the lake is in the parish of Rieste.

== Lake environment ==
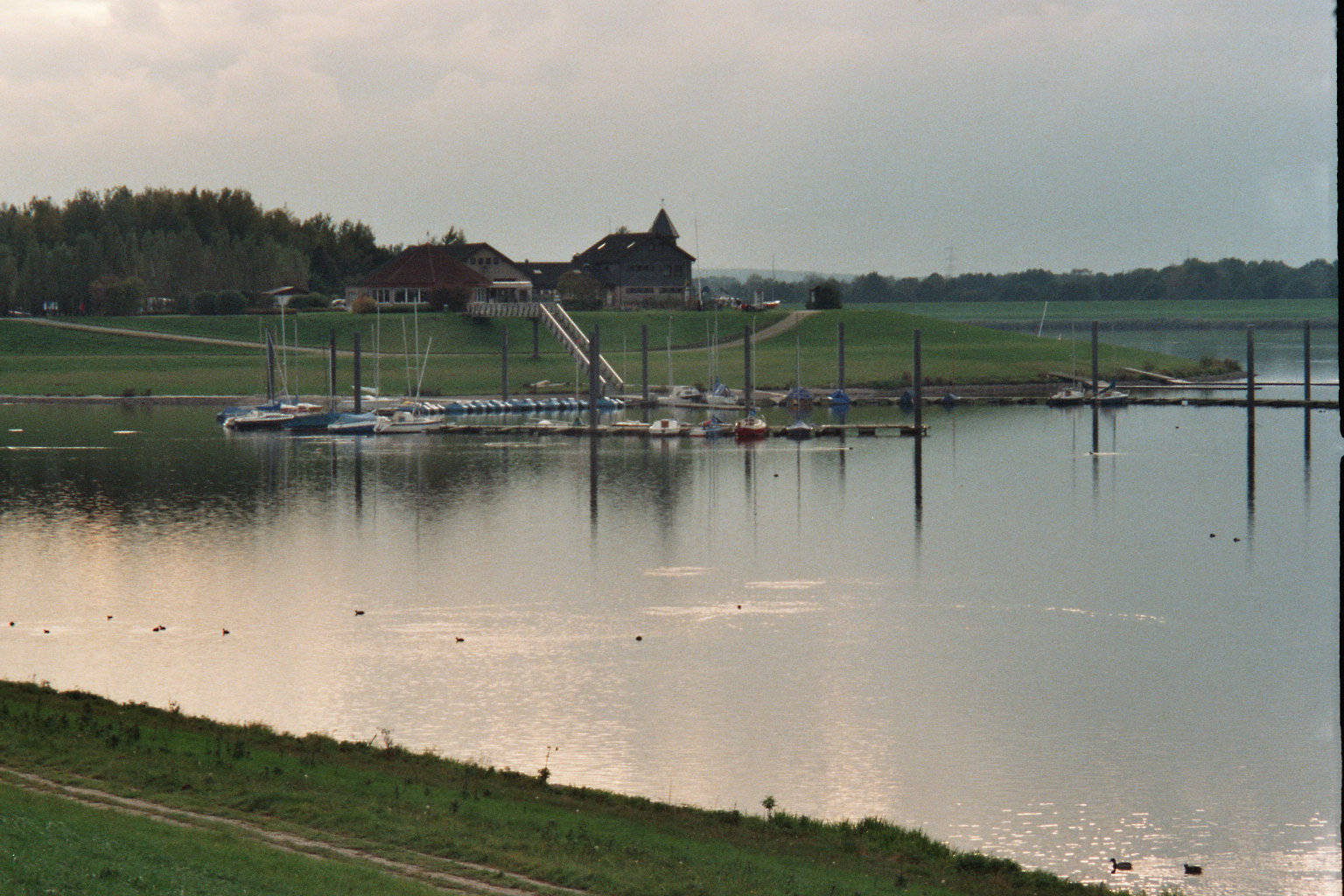
Boat harbour on the Alfsee

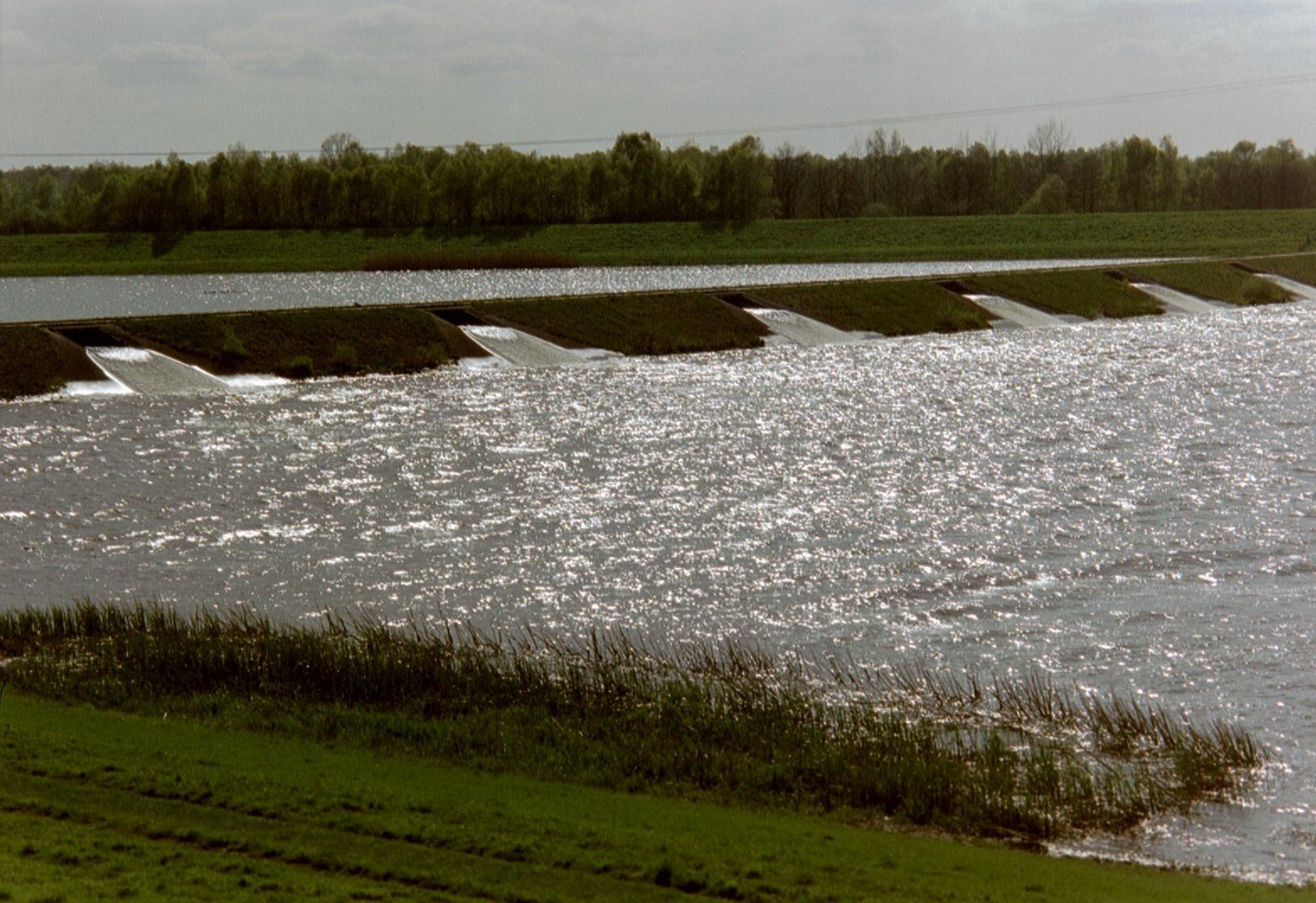
Spillway in the Alfsee

=== Four lakes ===
The water surface of the Alfsee covers 2.2 km^{2} and its shore is about 7 km long. Its maximum north-south length is 2.88 km. From east to west the lake is up to 330 m across in the south and 1,350 m in the north. It has a capacity of 20 million m^{3} at a depth of 2 m.

Immediately to the south, where the artificially constructed conduit of the river Hase flows into the Alfsee lakes, there is a small auxiliary basin (Absetzbecken) in front of the actual reservoir, from which water flows into the lake via a roughly 330 m long overflow dam.

To the east the Alfsee borders on the small Dubbelausee, which is up to 400 m long in an east-west direction and up to 360 m long from north to south and set at a height of 37 m above sea level (NN).

Just to the northeast, as part of as small nature reserve there is a reserve basin (Reservebecken), which is up to 700 m long from north to south and a maximum of 425 m from east to west.

=== Head- and tailwaters ===
Roughly north of the town of Bramsche an artificial channel branches off the Hase that takes water from the south for about 4.5 km to the lakes of the Alfsee. The water draining from the Alfsee runs over a similar artificial drainage channel, about 1.3 km long, directly west of the reserve basin north of the Alfsee, where it flows along the 2.5 km long canalised lower reaches of the Ueffelner Aue, which passes the Alfsee to the west running in a south to north direction west of Alfhausen, before flowing back into the Hase.

== History ==
Construction on the Alfsee began in 1971. From 1976 a holiday park was built on the eastern shore within the parish of Rieste. Today this has holiday homes, several campsites and sports pitches as well as a boating harbour with a sailing school and a waterskiing area. As well as holiday makers and water sports enthusiasts, the Alfsee is popular with anglers, particularly because of the presence of tench.

== Transport links ==
The Alfsee, which is located southeast of Alfhausen a few hundred metres east of the B 68, can be accessed from this federal road and from the Neuenkirchen-Vörden junction of the A 1 motorway that passes it to the east.

The station at Rieste which is served hourly by trains from Bremen and Osnabrück is only about 1,800m from the Alfsee.

== See also ==
- List of reservoirs and dams in Germany
