= Korn (liquor) =

German colorless grain spirit

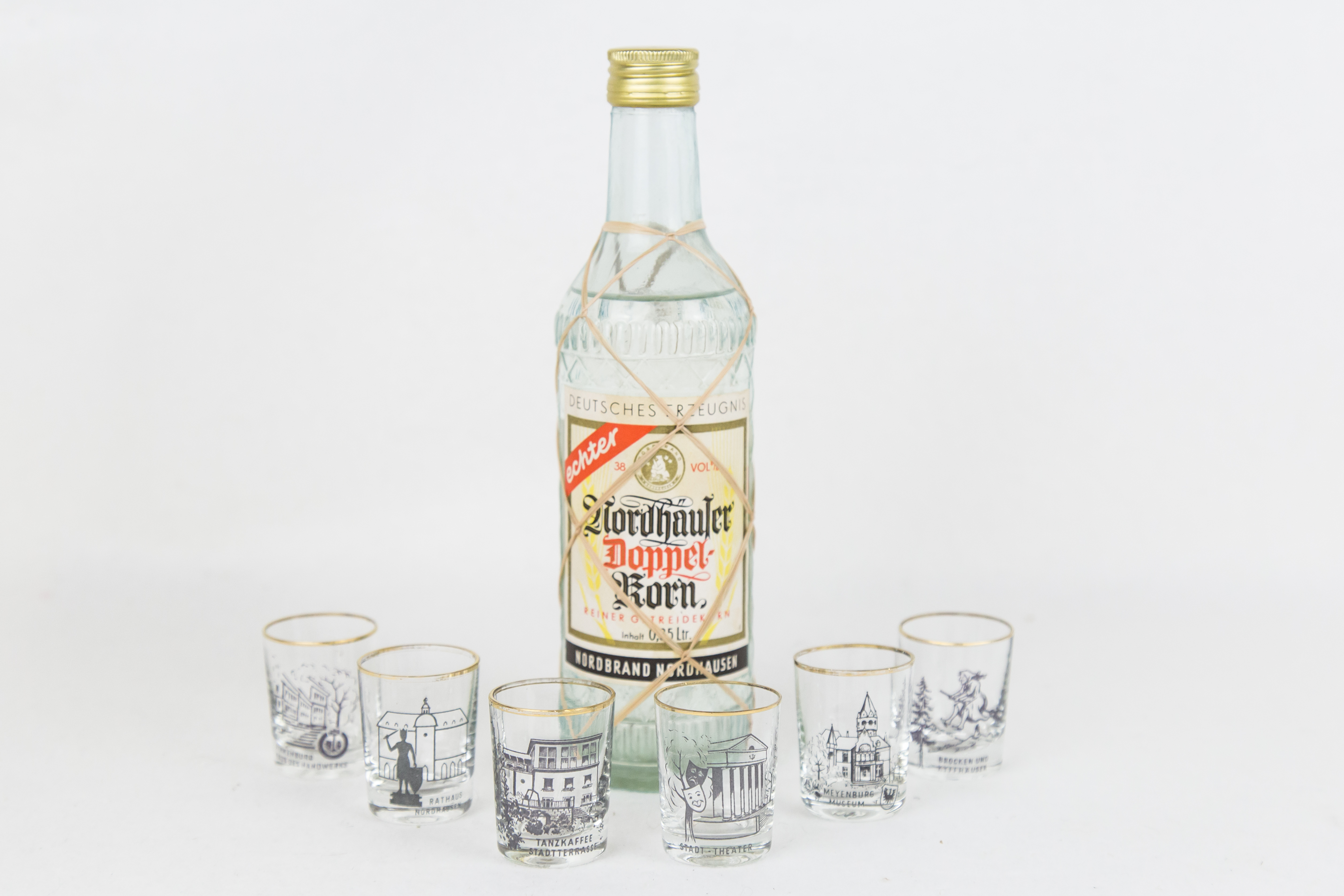
DDR Nordhäuser Doppelkorn with customary glasses.

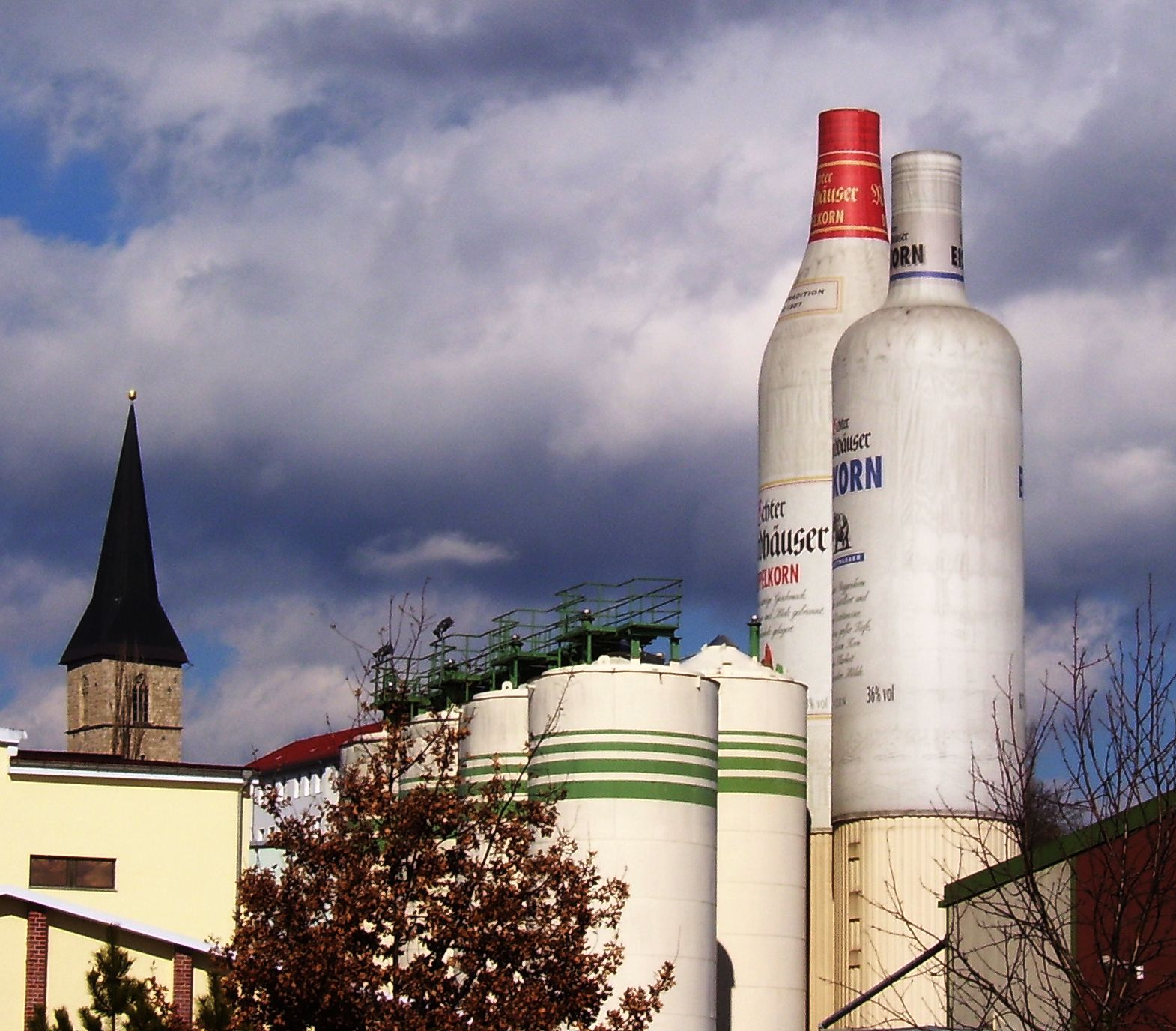
The Nordhäuser Korn distillery in Nordhausen, Germany

Korn (from German, "grain", pronounced [kɔʁn], English "corn"), also known as Kornbrand or Kornbranntwein (English: "grain brandy" or "grain spirit"), is a German colorless distilled beverage produced from fermented cereal grain seed. The production of Korn uses only five grains: most of the production is based on rye or wheat; barley is mainly used to obtain the required malt for the brewing process; oats and buckwheat are rarely used. Adding food colorings, flavorings, or sweeteners is not permitted. Korn is distilled to lower alcoholic proofs and filtered less rigorously than vodka, leaving more cereal grain flavor in the finished spirit.

Korn must contain a minimum of 32% ABV (64 proof). Above 37.5% ABV (75 proof), it may be named Kornbrand, and the name Doppelkorn, with 38% ABV (76 proof), has been used in the market.

Korn is usually consumed neat in shot glasses, but is also popular with a soft drink mixer. In some places, a beer is often ordered with a Kurzer ("short"), i.e., a shot glass of Korn. In most parts of Germany, this combination is called a "Herrengedeck" (literally "gentlemen's place-setting"; English: "Boilermaker"). Fruit-flavored products made with Korn are available from some Korn manufacturers, though they are sold as liqueurs since Korn itself cannot be flavored.

Very strong Korn (80% ABV / 160 proof) is known as "Ansatzkorn" and is typically used to produce home-made liqueurs from fruits and herbs, such as Zirbenschnaps (liqueur flavored with stone pine cones); this practice is particularly common in alpine regions. Such liqueurs are usually diluted to drinking strength before bottling. Like other neutral strong spirits, Ansatzkorn can also be used as a disinfectant for domestic use.

== History ==
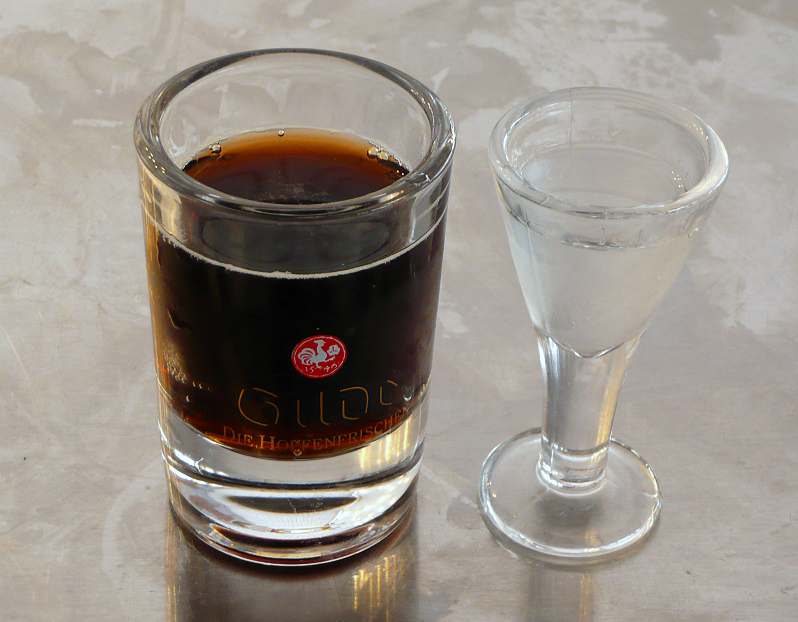
A Lüttje Lage, a common pairing in the Hannover region, of a 50 ml (1.7 US fl oz) glass of beer and 10 ml (0.34 US fl oz) glass of Korn.

Korn is believed to have been produced in Germany since the 15th century. The first Korn production ban was imposed in 1545. A decree by the city council of Nordhausen prohibited using grain or malt to produce spirits. Historians believe beer brewers wanted to defend themselves against the competition of Kornbrand producers, which had increased the cost of grain.

The first "purity law" (German Reinheitsgebot) for the distillation of Korn was established in 1789. The regulation set by the city of Nordhausen stipulated that two-thirds rye and one-third barley or malt shall be used.

Korn is seen in Germany as "a cheap liquor that is mainly drunk by workers and farmers." In contrast to this image, beginning in the late 2000s, a number of companies began producing premium Korn, including barrel-aged versions, as part of a trend towards hand-crafted, traditional, and local products.

== Manufacture ==
The process for distilling Korn is similar to other grain-based distilled spirits, such as whisky. Grain, normally wheat or rye, is ground, usually in a hammermill, and then cooked with hot water to form a mash. The temperature is then reduced, and enzyme-rich ground barley malt or enzyme mixture is added to convert the grain starches into sugar. The mash is then cooled and fermented with yeast, producing ethanol. This is followed by distillation. The spirit is subjected to multiple distillations in order to remove unwanted odors and flavors. The resulting high-proof distillate (about 85% ABV, compared to about 95% for vodka) is diluted with water. To round off and harmonize the bouquet, high-quality Kornbrands are aged in oak, then diluted to the desired drinking strength and bottled.

== Korn production in Germany ==
The industrial production of Korn is concentrated in several regions of Germany: Bad Oldesloe in Schleswig-Holstein, Nordhausen in northern Thuringia, Haselünne in the Lower Saxony district of Emsland and Oelde in Westphalia. In Nordhausen, the company Echter Nordhäuser Spirituosen GmbH produces the Korn brand "Echter Nordhäuser" (Original Nordhausener). In 1799, Otto von Bismarck's father, Karl Wilhelm Ferdinand, established a Korn distillery at Schönhausen.

Korn market leaders in Germany are the brands Oldesloer Weizenkorn, followed by Strothmann Weizenkorn and Echter Nordhäuser Korn (2004). For Doppelkorn, Echter Nordhäuser Doppelkorn was the market leader in 2007, followed by Berentzen Doornkaat and Fürst Bismarck Kornbrand.

Korn is the traditional liquor used for Mexikaner.

== See also ==
- Schnapps – Several types of flavored distilled alcoholic beverages
