= Petiot =

Petiot is a French surname. Notable individuals bearing this surname include:

- Fernand Petiot (1900–1975), French-American bartender who claimed to have created the Bloody Mary
- Henri Jules Charles Petiot (1901–1965), French writer and historian writing as Daniel-Rops
- Marcel Petiot (1897–1946), French doctor and serial killer
- Richard Petiot (* born 1982), Canadian ice hockey player
