= Jens Robben =

German footballer (born 1983)

Personal information
- Date of birth: 27 April 1983 (age 43)
- Place of birth: Haselünne, West Germany
- Height: 1.81 m (5 ft 11 in)
- Position: Midfielder

Youth career
- –1996: SV Erika Altenberge

Senior career*
Years	Team	Apps	(Gls)
1996–2004	SV Meppen		
2004–2005	Eintracht Trier	15	(0)
2006–2009	Rot-Weiß Oberhausen	77	(10)
2009	SV Meppen		
2010	Berliner FC Dynamo	0	(0)
2010–2018	SV Meppen	169	(10)
- * Club domestic league appearances and goals

Jens Robben (born 27 April 1983) is a German former professional footballer who played as a midfielder.

== Playing career ==
Born in Haselünne, Robben made his debut at a professional level in the 2. Bundesliga for Eintracht Trier on 8 August 2004, when he came on as a substitute for Matthias Keller in the 73rd minute in a game against Rot-Weiß Oberhausen.

In 2010, Robben rejoined SV Meppen. He announced his retirement from playing in May 2018.

== Post-playing career ==
After retiring as a player, Robben assumed the role of scout and video analyst at SV Meppen.
