= Mexikaner =

Mixed shot containing korn and tomato juice

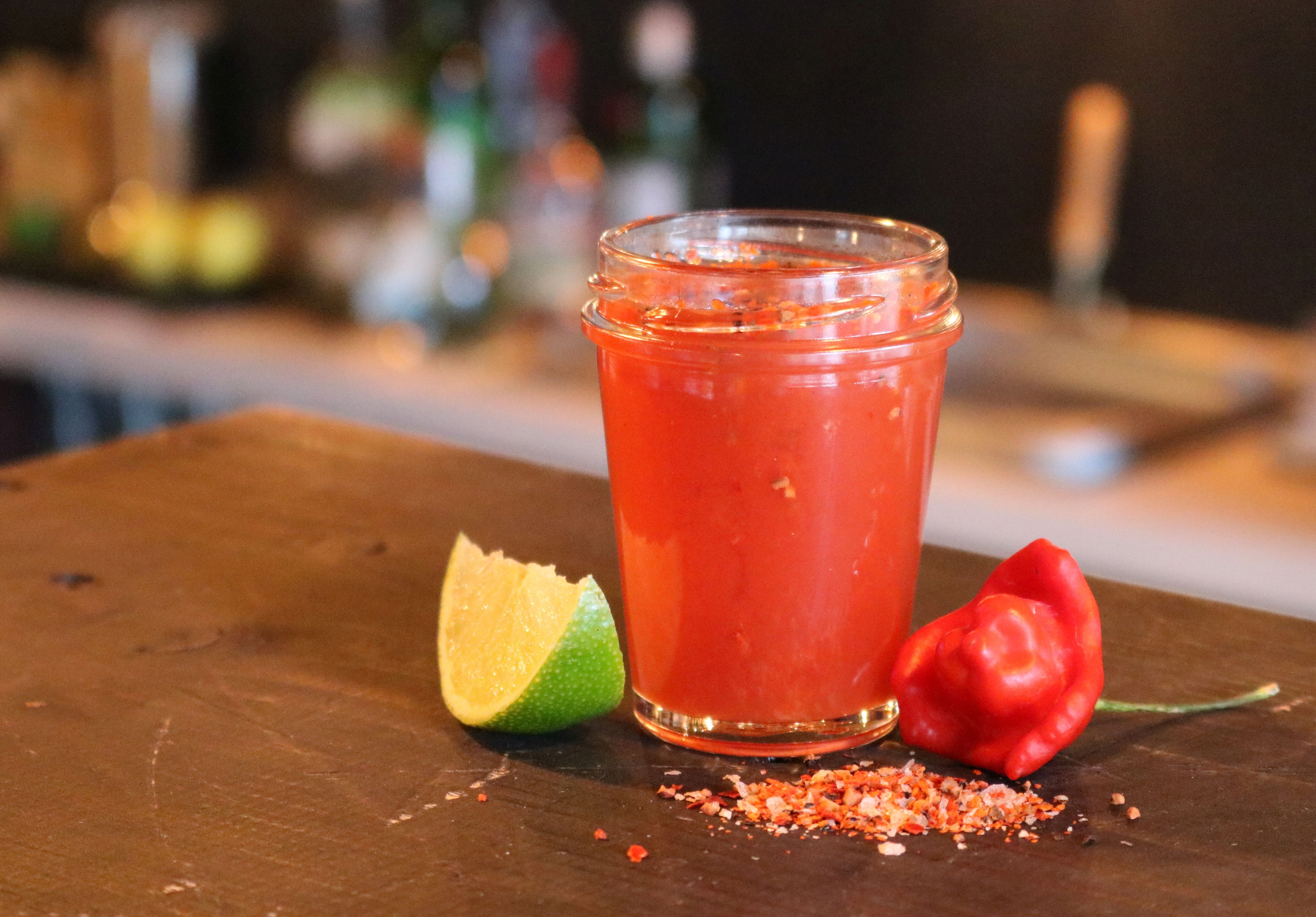
A shot of Mexikaner

A Mexikaner (lit. 'Mexican') is a mixed shot made from a clear liquor (traditionally Korn, but sometimes vodka or tequila are used), tomato juice, sangrita, Tabasco sauce, salt and black pepper. The recipe is similar to a Bloody Mary, but is more heavily spiced and typically served as a shot.

Despite its name, the Mexikaner is a German invention and unknown in Mexico.

== History ==
The drink originates from Hamburg, Germany, where the barkeeper Mike Coloni first served it in 1987 at his bar Steppenwolf in St. Pauli. The recipe was improvised to cover up the flavor of a cheap fruit spirit he had accidentally purchased instead of Korn, a traditional clear grain spirit. Coloni was satisfied with the result and, after finishing the fruit spirit, continued offering it on his menu, made from korn instead. The name is a reference to the spicy flavor, which a patron found reminiscent of Mexico. Although Coloni did not enjoy the drink himself, the Mexikaner – which was sold for only 99 Pfennig (equivalent to €0.93 in 2021) – was a hit with his guests. Other bars in St. Pauli soon began offering their own Mexikaner, and the drink became a hit and object of local pride". Coloni revealed his original recipe in 2008 after his bar closed.

Although it is most commonly found in Hamburg, the shot is now available in many other cities in Germany. It is more commonly associated with dive bars and local neighborhood pubs, but can be occasionally found in more upscale establishments.

== Recipe ==
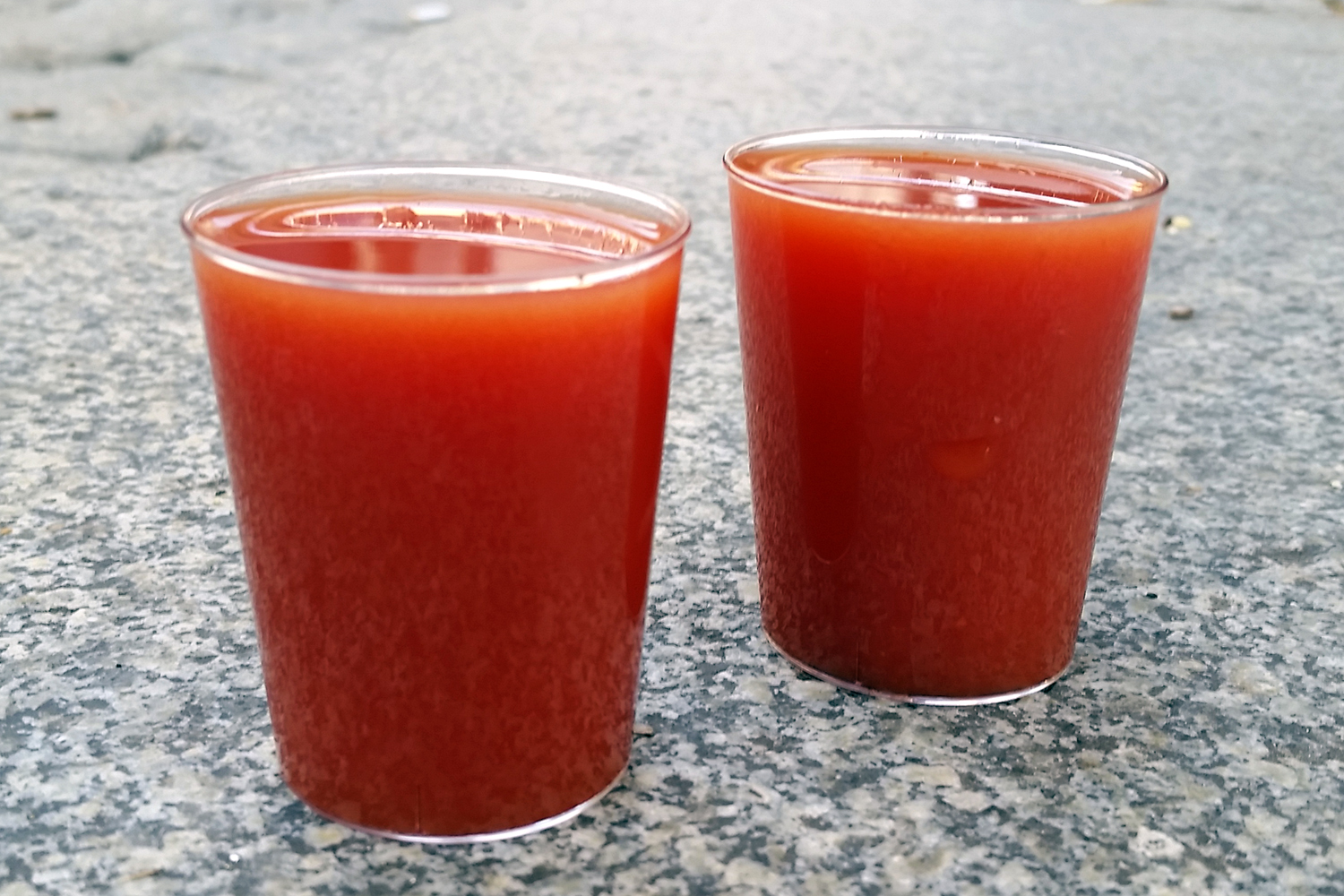
Two shots of Mexikaner.

The original recipe from the Hamburg bar Steppenwolf consists of 0.7 litres of Korn, 1.5 litres of tomato juice and 0.7 litres of Taki Taki or sangrita; another source gives the recipe as 0.7 litres of Korn, 2.1 litres of tomato juice and 0.5 litres of Taki Taki. This mixture is combined with one heaping tablespoon each of salt and black pepper, and 30 ml of Tabasco sauce. It is prepared in advance and served cold, without ice, in a shot glass.

Like many cocktails, a number of different recipes exist. In some variations, vodka, tequila, or mezcal are used; lemon or lime juice may be present; other spices such as chili powder or coriander, or other herbs. It has been described as a "spicy smoothie", which is "open to endless experimentation." Pre-mixed versions are also available in retail.

In comparison to other shots, a Mexikaner does not contain much alcohol. Depending on the recipe and strength of the korn, a Mexikaner contains about 6-9% alcohol by volume. One bartender indicated that the vitamins and electrolytes, along with its low alcohol content, make the Mexikaner unsuitable for those seeking to become intoxicated.
