= Pine liqueur =

Spirit produced from stone pine trees

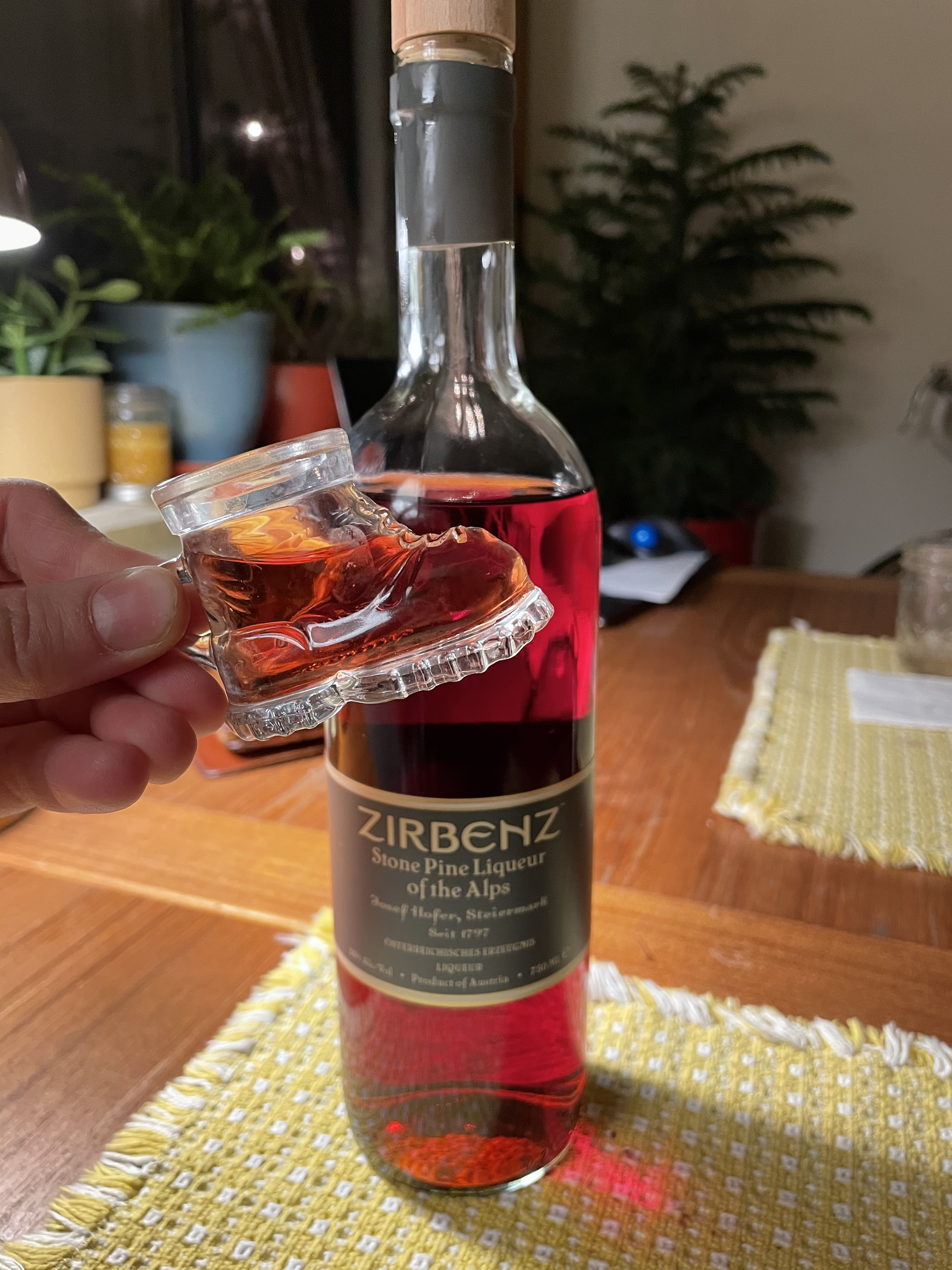
Zirbenz brand stone pine liqueur

Pine liqueur, pine brandy, and pine schnapps are spirits distilled from stone pine trees (in German: Zirbelkiefern). They are manufactured in the Alps, primarily in Austria, where the stone pines grow especially well at altitudes of 1500+ meters.

== Production ==
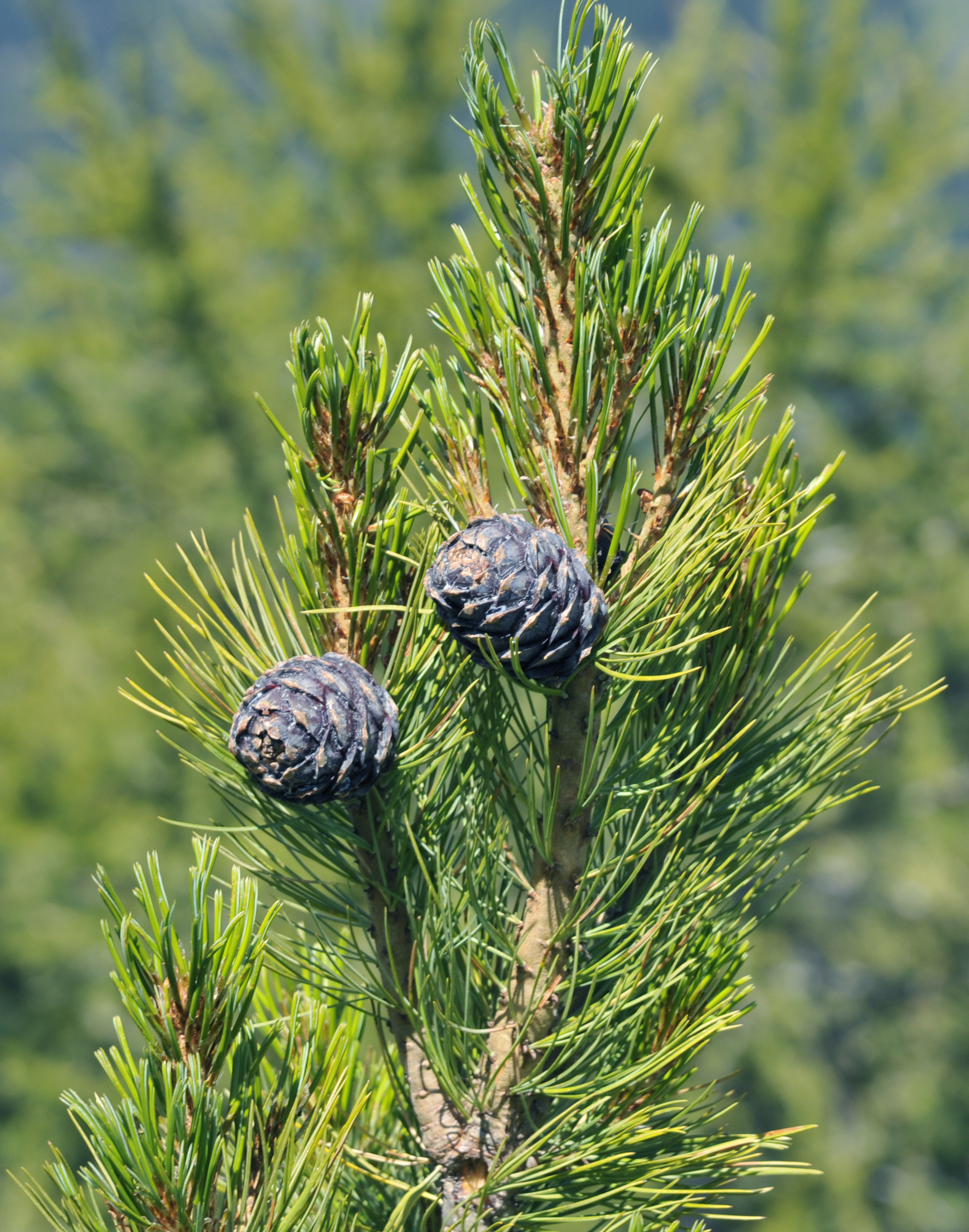
Stone pine cones in South Tyrol

To produce pine liqueur, the red pine cones are collected at the end of June, mid-July, while they are still in full sap, before they're woody. The harvest is often labor-intensive, as the pine cones can only be hand-picked when allowed (the trees are often located in natural protection areas, where cone-harvesting is not allowed). After the cones are harvested, they are cut into 3–5 mm slices and soaked in grain brandy. In contrast to fruit brandy, grain brandy has a weaker taste, allowing for a more pure pine flavor. During this time, the bottles are shaken periodically, allowing the pine substance to be absorbed into the brandy. At this point, the liquid is now brown, and it is run through a filter to remove any debris. Then sugar, rock sugar, or honey is added to soften the tart taste.

Pine brandy, or pine geist, (German: Zirbengeist) can also be made by further distilling the liquid instead of filtering and adding sugars. A variant of pine brandy utilizes lignified pine cones, collected in October. The seeds are extracted, crushed, mixed with grain schnapps, and distilled directly. Through the distilling process, the debris of the pine seeds are left behind, and the essential oils and their natural aromas are carried through, creating a crystal-clear stone pine spirit with a strong pine aroma.

== Uses ==
Pine liqueur is often used to remedy colds, because of the essential oils it contains. Pine brandy is also used as a remedy for aching limbs and muscle generation.

The liqueur is often consumed during après-ski gatherings, after hiking or mountaineering at Alpine huts, or near the Christmas holidays.
