= Alfhausen =

- Municipality
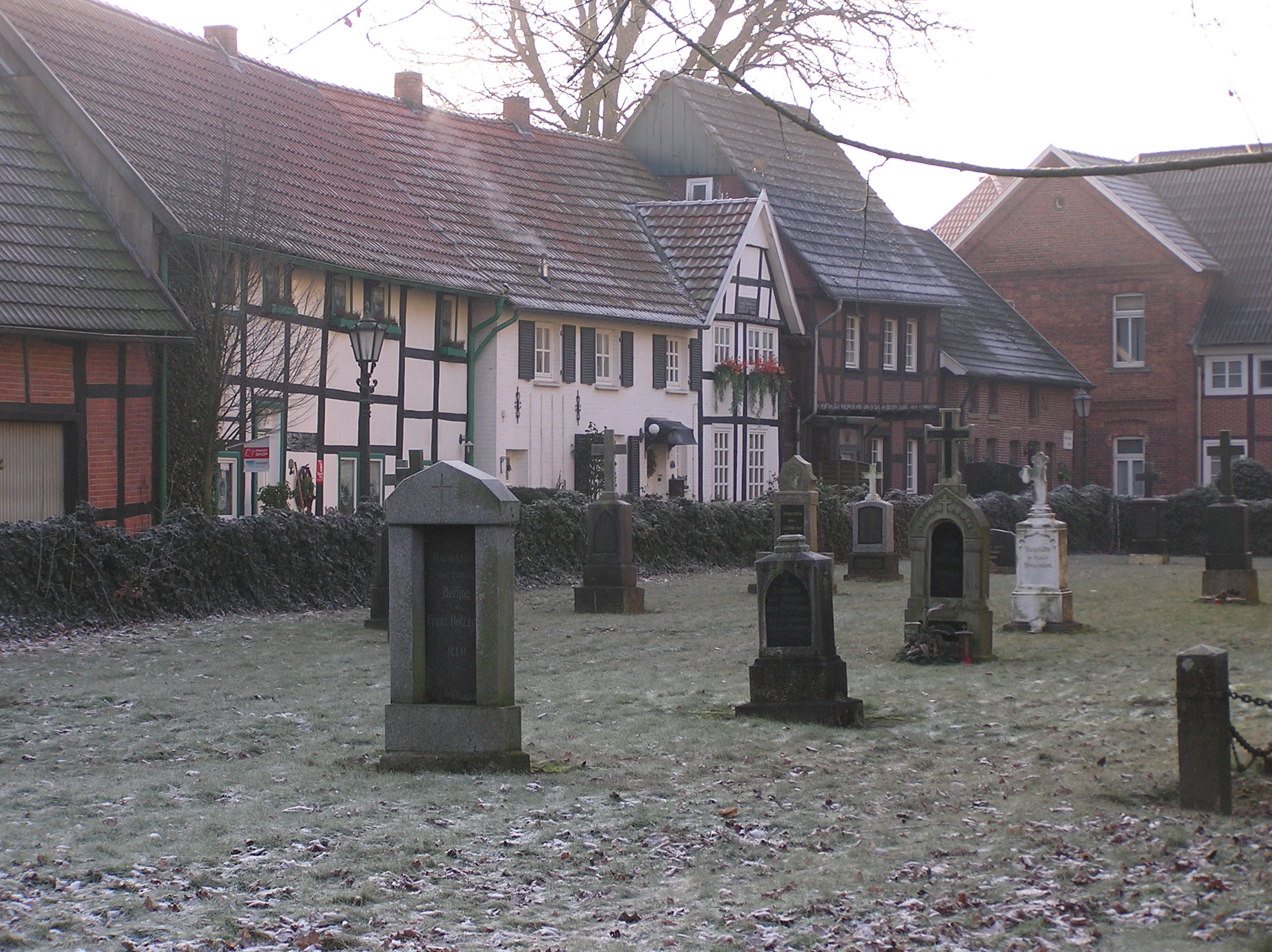

- Coat of arms

- Location of Alfhausen within Osnabrück district
- Interactive map of Alfhausen
- Location within Germany Location within Lower Saxony
- Coordinates: 52°30′07″N 7°57′05″E
- Country: Germany
- State: Lower Saxony
- District: Osnabrück
- Municipal assoc.: Bersenbrück
- Subdivisions: 4 Ortsteile

Government
  - Mayor: Agnes Droste (CDU)

Area
  - Total: 39 km^{2} (15 sq mi)
- Elevation: 38 m (125 ft)

Population (2025-12-31)
  - Total: 4,210
  - Density: 110/km^{2} (280/sq mi)
- Time zone: UTC+01:00 (CET)
  - Summer (DST): UTC+02:00 (CEST)
- Postal codes: 49594
- Dialling codes: 05464
- Vehicle registration: OS, BSB, MEL, WTL
- Website: www.alfhausen.de

Alfhausen is a village in the collective municipality (Samtgemeinde) of Bersenbrück in the district of Osnabrück, Lower Saxony, Germany.

== Geography ==
=== Location ===
Alfhausen is located just under 27 km north of Osnabrück, and is in the north-west corner of Germany.

=== Climate ===
The area has a mild maritime climate affected by the moist northwest wind from the North Sea. The average annual temperature in Alfhausen is 8.5° - 9.0 °C and average annual precipitation is around 700 mm. Between May and August there is an average of 20-25 "summer days" (the climatological name for days on which the maximum temperature exceeds 25 °C).

== History ==
Alfhausen was founded in 974. The name Alfhausen comes from the Low German and means "eleven houses". Its exact history is however unknown. The majority of the population is Roman Catholic. However, there are other religious communities in the town. In Early Modern times, the town came under the rule of the Kingdom of Hanover. Quite a number of its inhabitants emigrated to Baltimore and Cincinnati, Ohio & Northern Kentucky in the United States in the 1830s to 1860s.

== Sights ==
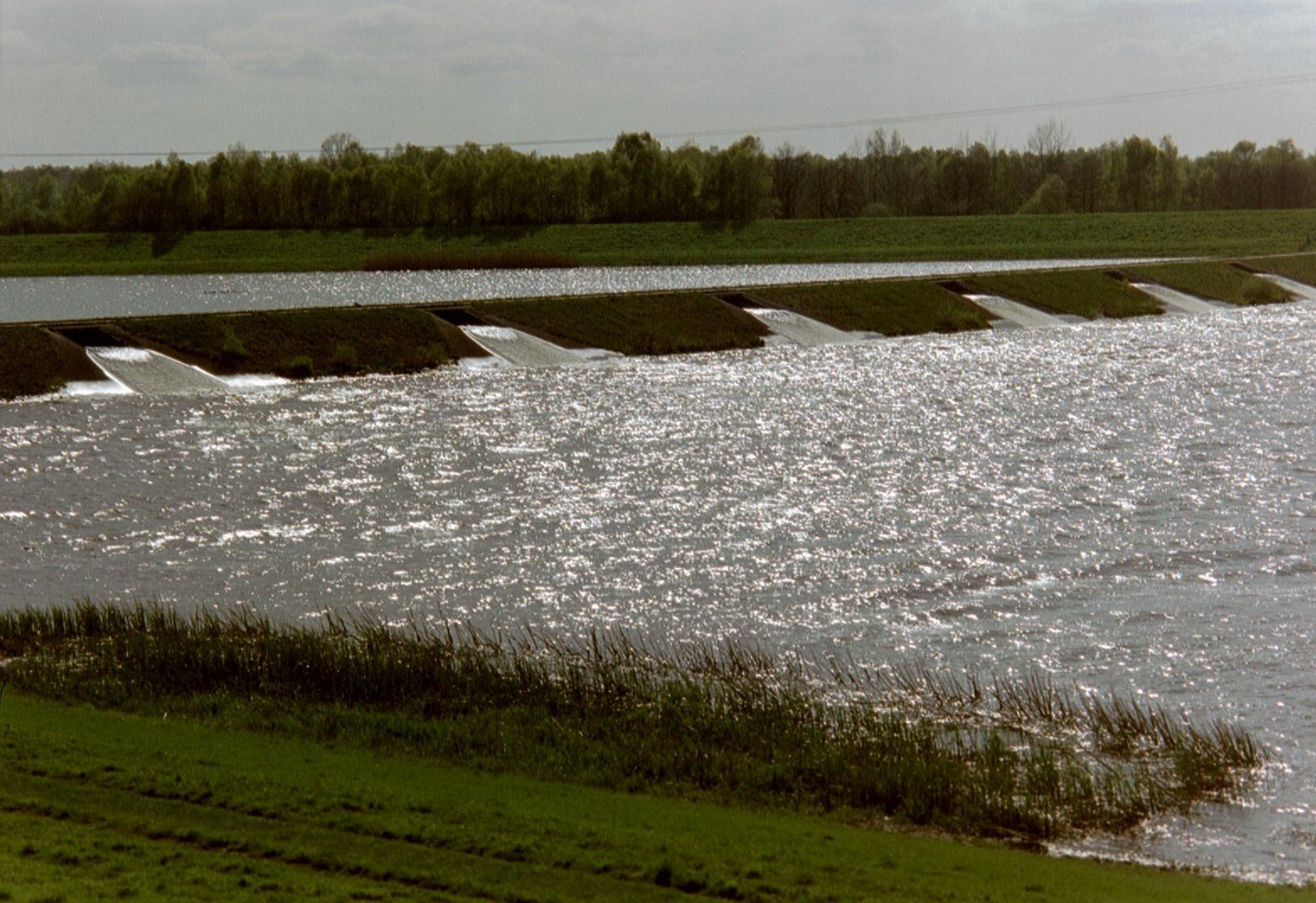
The Alfsee

In 1971, the Alfsee lake was created as a flood control storage basin for the River Hase; it was named after its closeness to the municipality of Alfhausen. As a popular destination for holiday makers and day trippers, the lake has gained great importance in recent years. The retention basin was extended in the 1990s by a second, in order to hold water from a larger catchment area.

The newly renovated St. John's Church, built in the 13th century, is popular with couples getting married. Its interior partly dates to the Gothic era, for example the Bentheim font and the Madonna.

There are a number of 16th-century buildings in the old village centre.

== Stolperstein ==
As part of the Europe-wide Stolperstein project initiated by Gunter Demnig, several commemorative brass plaques have been laid in Alfhausen to honour local victims of National Socialism. The first stones were laid on 26 April 2016 outside a house on Thiener Straße 12, commemorating seven members of the Meyer and de Jonge families, most of whom were deported to Theresienstadt and later murdered at Auschwitz, Treblinka, Riga, or the Brandenburg Euthanasia Centre.
