= Tobias Goldschmidt =

German politician (born 1981)

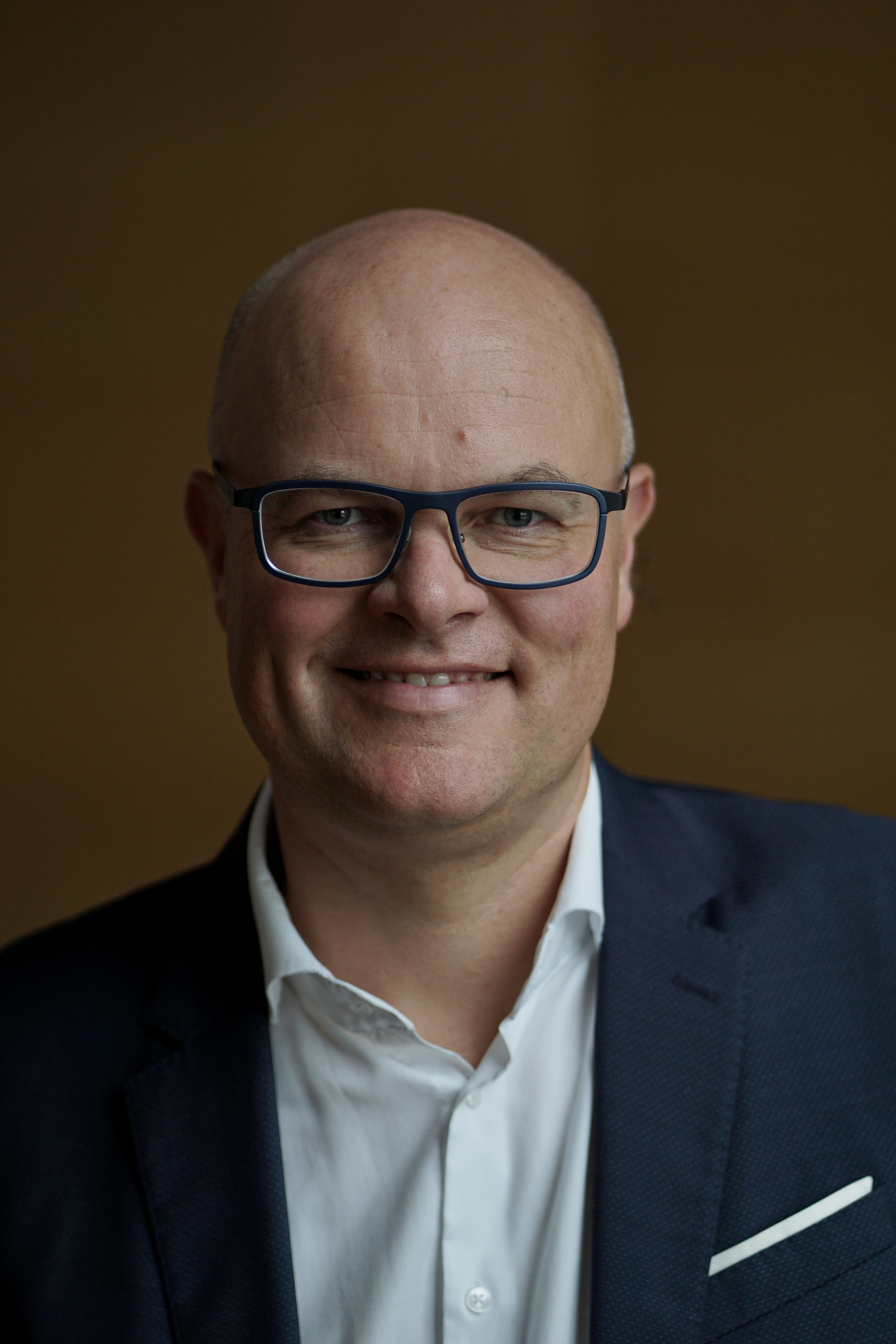

Schleswig-Holstein Minister of Energy Transition, Climate Protection, Environment and Nature
- Incumbent
- Assumed office 29 June 2022
- Appointed by: Daniel Günther

State Secretary to the Schleswig-Holstein Ministry of Energy, Agriculture, the Environment, Nature and Digitalization
- In office 28 June 2017 – 29 June 2022 Serving with Dorit Kuhnt
- Appointed by: Monika Heinold

Personal details
- Born: 16 September 1981 (age 44) Haselünne, West Germany
- Party: Alliance 90/The Greens Alliance 90/The Greens

Tobias Goldschmidt (born 16 September 1981 in Haselünne) is a German politician of Alliance 90/The Greens who has been serving as State Minister of Energy Transition, Climate Protection, Energy and Nature in the government of Schleswig-Holstein since 2022.

== Live ==
Goldschmidt studied political science at the Free University of Berlin and at Georgetown University in Washington, DC. He worked as a communications consultant in the public affairs branch in Berlin.

Goldschmidt has three children and lives in Schönkirchen, district of Plön.

== Career ==
Goldschmidt was initially appointed State Secretary to the Schleswig-Holstein Ministry of Energy, Agriculture, the Environment and Digitalization under Minister Jan Phillipp Albrecht but later served under acting Minister Monika Heinold.

In the negotiations to form a so-called traffic light coalition of the Social Democratic Party (SPD), the Green Party and the Free Democratic Party (FDP) on the national level following the 2021 federal elections, Goldschmidt was part of his party's delegation in the working group on climate protection and energy policy, co-chaired by Matthias Miersch, Oliver Krischer and Lukas Köhler.

On 29 June 2022, Goldschmidt joined the Second Günther Cabinet as Schleswig-Holstein's State Minister of Energy Transition, Climate Protection, Environment and Nature. As one of his state's representatives at the Bundesrat, he serves on the Committee on the Environment, Nature Protection and Reactor Safety and the Committee on Economic Affairs.

== Other activities ==
- Federal Network Agency for Electricity, Gas, Telecommunications, Post and Railway (BNetzA), Member of the Advisory Board (since 2022)

== Personal life ==
Goldschmidt is married and has three children.
