= List of Stolpersteine in Alfhausen =

Memorial installations in Germany

This article lists the Stolpersteine that were laid in Alfhausen as part of the project of the same name by Gunter Demnig. They serve as a memorial to victims of National Socialism who lived and worked in Alfhausen.

== Stolpersteine ==
Address	Date laid	Person, inscription	Image
Thiener Straße 12, Alfhausen 52.4979777°N 7.9502870°E	26 April 2016	Here lived Antonie Marcus née Meyer b. 1874 deported 1942 Theresienstadt 1942 Treblinka murdered	Stolperstein Antonie Marcus
Thiener Straße 12, Alfhausen 52.4979777°N 7.9502870°E	26 April 2016	Here lived Elise de Jonge deported 1942 Theresienstadt 1944 Auschwitz murdered	Stolperstein Elise de Jonge
Thiener Straße 12, Alfhausen 52.4979777°N 7.9502870°E	26 April 2016	Here lived Hugo Meyer b. 1882 'protective custody' 1938 Buchenwald released 1939 deported 1942 Theresienstadt 1944 Auschwitz murdered	Stolperstein Hugo Meyer
Thiener Straße 12, Alfhausen 52.4979777°N 7.9502870°E	26 April 2016	Here lived Mathilde Meyer née Aronstein b. 1887 deported 1941 Riga murdered	Stolperstein Mathilde Meyer
Thiener Straße 12, Alfhausen 52.4979777°N 7.9502870°E	26 April 2016	Here lived Pauline de Jonge née Meyer b. 1877 deported 1942 Theresienstadt murdered 27.8.1942	Stolperstein Pauline de Jonge
Thiener Straße 12, Alfhausen 52.4979777°N 7.9502870°E	26 April 2016	Here lived Rosa de Jonge née Meyer b. 1878 committed to Osnabrück sanatorium 'transferred' 27.9.1940 Brandenburg murdered 27.9.1940	Stolperstein Rosa de Jonge
Thiener Straße 12, Alfhausen 52.4979777°N 7.9502870°E	26 April 2016	Here lived Siegfried Meyer b. 1887 'protective custody' 1938 Buchenwald murdered 22.11.1938	Stolperstein Siegfried Meyer
