= Bramgau =

Historical name of settlements around Bramsche, Lower Saxony, Germany

The Bramgau is the historic name for the region of settlement around the independent municipality of Bramsche in the north of the district of Osnabrück in the German federal state of Lower Saxony. with megalithic tombs and tumuli from the New Stone Age and Bronze Age. It lies within the TERRA.vita Nature and Geopark.

The holiday road known as the Bramgau Route runs through the Bramgau (in all about 103 km long) as does the Route of Megalithic Culture.
