= Apfelkorn =

Type of liqueur

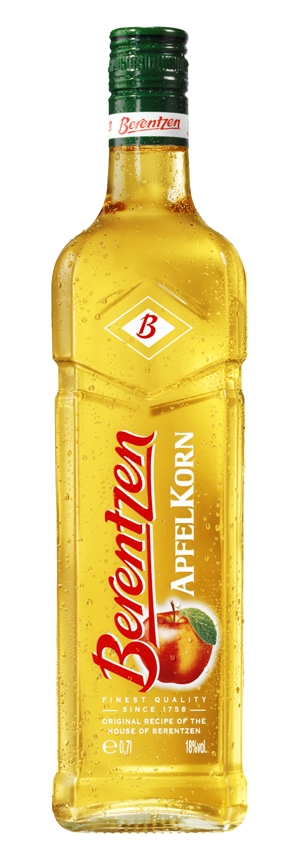
Berentzen Apfelkorn

Apfelkorn is a sweet apple-flavored liqueur made from 100% wheat spirit, and blended with apples. It was invented in Germany in the 1970s.

The original was made by Berentzen. Apfelkorn is considered a schnapps and is very sweet with a strong, sweet "apple juice" flavor. Alcohol content is 20% while a typical schnapps is 40%. Apfelkorn was the first of a number of "new" similar liqueurs entering the German market from the late 1970s onwards. Apfelkorn separates itself from another spirit by a similar name; 'Apfelmost' which is made from freshly pressed apples, whereas Apfelkorn is made purely from wheat
