= Wellingholzhausen =

Village in Lower Saxony, Germany

Coordinates: 52°9′N 8°16′E

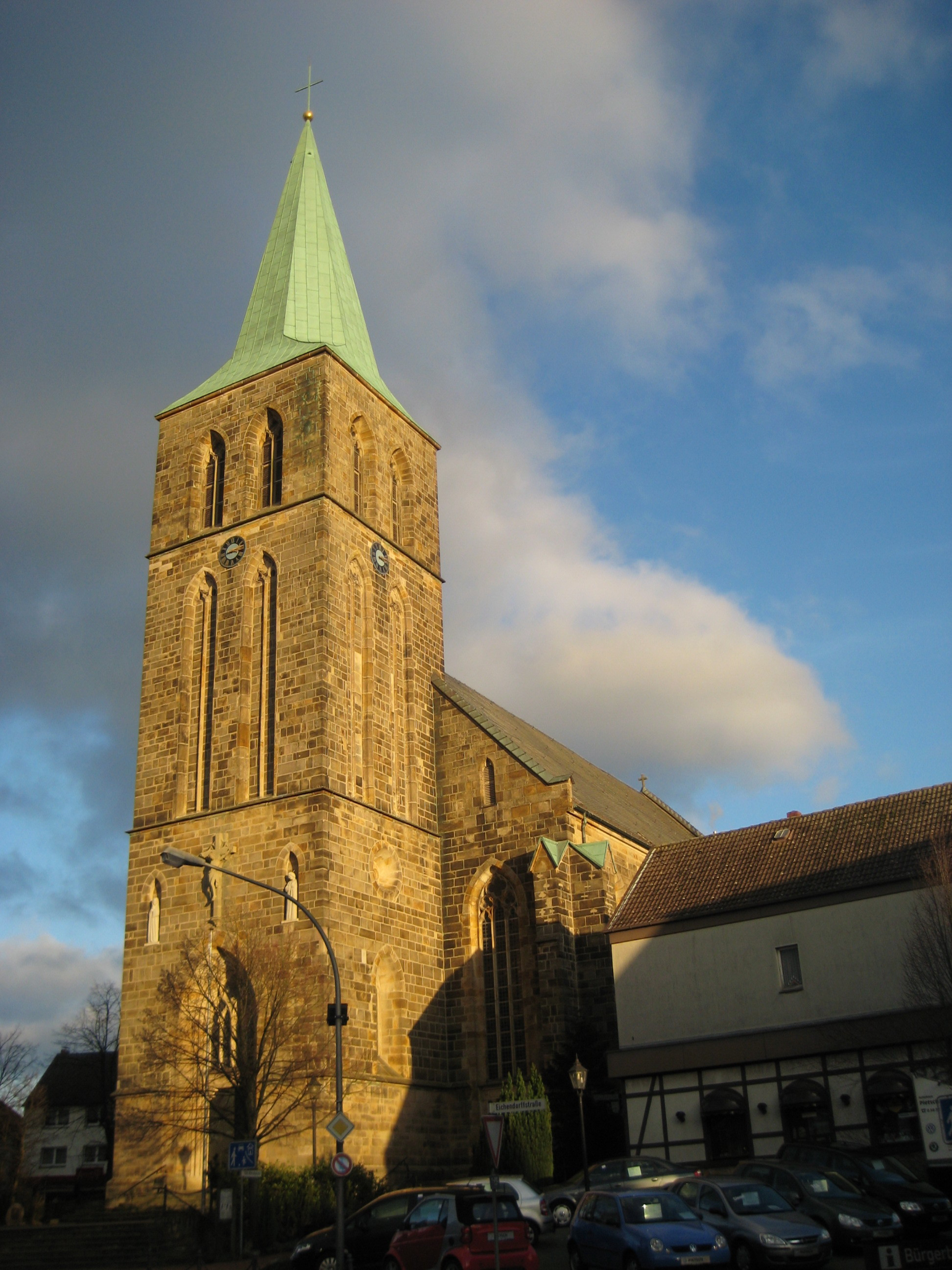
Church of St. Bartholomew in Melle-Wellingholzhausen.

Wellingholzhausen is a village, now part of the municipality of Melle, in the district of Osnabrück, in Lower Saxony, Germany. It is situated approximately 25 km southeast of Osnabrück and 25 km northwest of Bielefeld.
