= Haselünne =

- Town
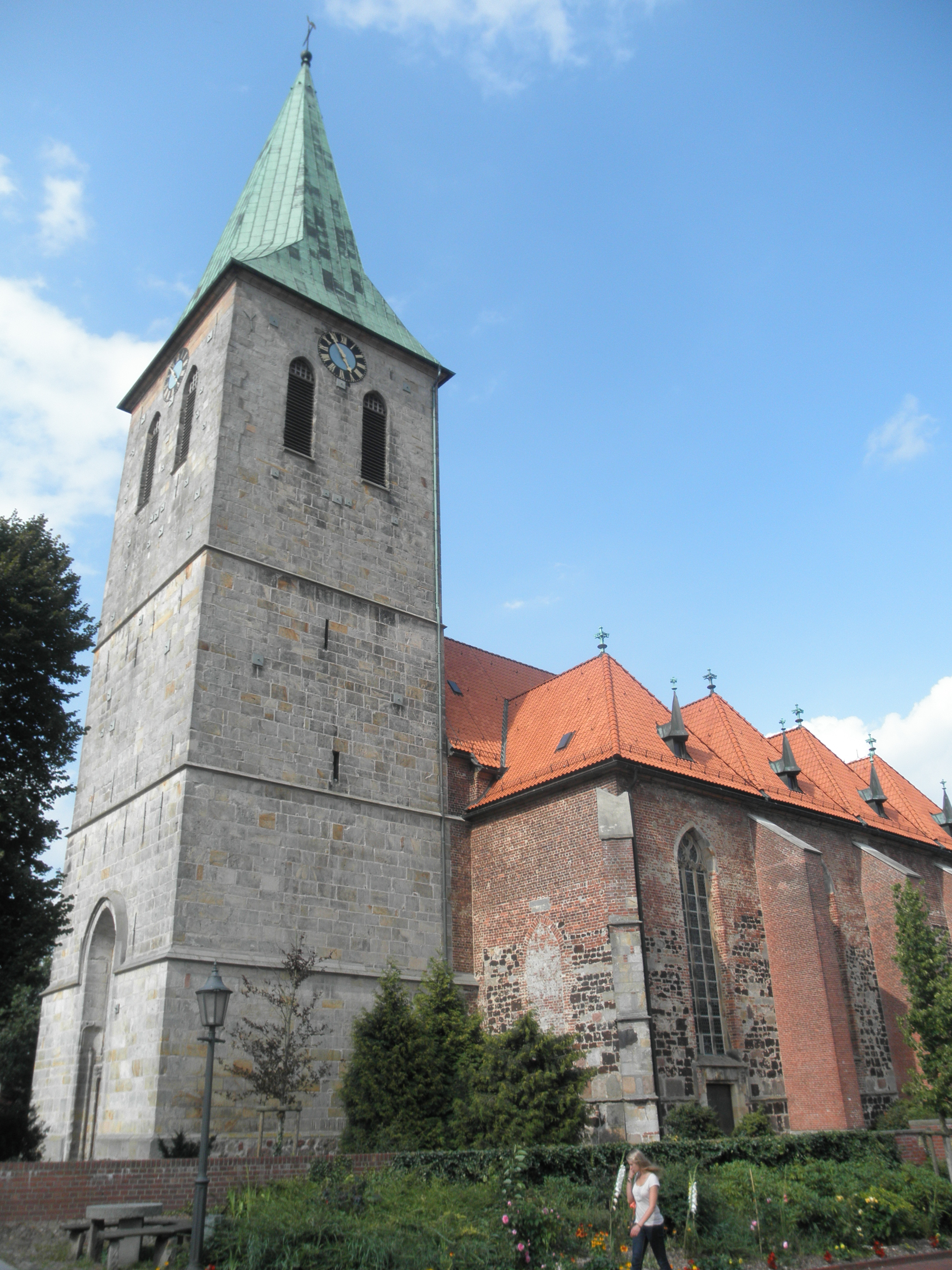
- Church of Saint Vincent

- Flag Coat of arms

- Location of Haselünne within Emsland district
- Interactive map of Haselünne
- Location within Germany Location within Lower Saxony
- Coordinates: 52°40′N 7°28′E
- Country: Germany
- State: Lower Saxony
- District: Emsland

Government
  - Mayor (2019–24): Werner Schräer (CDU)

Area
  - Total: 159.43 km^{2} (61.56 sq mi)
- Elevation: 20 m (66 ft)

Population (2025-12-31)
  - Total: 13,503
  - Density: 84.695/km^{2} (219.36/sq mi)
- Time zone: UTC+01:00 (CET)
  - Summer (DST): UTC+02:00 (CEST)
- Postal codes: 49740
- Dialling codes: 0 59 61
- Vehicle registration: EL
- Website: www.haseluenne.de

Haselünne (German pronunciation: [ˈhaːzl̩ˌʏnə]) is a town in Lower Saxony, Germany, in the district of Emsland. It is situated on the river Hase, approx. 15 km east of Meppen.

== Notable people ==
=== Notable people born in the city ===
- Anton C. R. Dreesmann (1854–1934), co-founder of the Vroom & Dreesmann department store.
- Friedrich Berentzen (1928–2009), entrepreneur (Berentzen).
- Said Bahaji (born 1975), alleged Islamist terrorist and presumed member of the Hamburg terror cell which participated in the terrorist attacks on 11 September 2001.
- Tobias Goldschmidt (born 1981), politician (Greens)
- Jens Robben (born 1983), soccer player.

=== Notable residents ===
- Dodo zu Innhausen und Knyphausen (1583–1636), commander in the Thirty Years War, died on January 1, 1636, in the Battle of Haselünne.
